= George Speaight =

British historian and puppeteer (1914–2005)

- Born: September 6, 1914
- Died: December 22, 2005 (aged 91)
- Occupations: Historian, author, performer
- Spouse: Mary Mudd (m. 1946)
- Children: Margaret and 1 other

George Victor Speaight FRSA (/speɪt/ SPAYT; 6 September 1914 – 22 December 2005) was a British theatre historian, author, and performer.

== Early years ==
Speaight was born on 6 September 1914. One of his brothers was actor Robert Speaight, who paid for some of his education at Haileybury. Like his older brother, George was a gifted and natural performer from a young age. At age four, he acted as the Page in a family production of Romeo and Juliet, and in 1921 won an elocution prize for the Ghost's speech in Hamlet.

Speaight was fascinated from his boyhood by toy theatres after his father bought him one from Benjamin Pollock's Toy Shop in Hoxton, and in the 1930s he professionally took up puppetry. He became known for his puppet show performances at the Bumpus bookstore in Oxford Street where he worked from 1932, when his father's bankruptcy denied him a university place. His shows here were appreciated by, among others, T. E. Lawrence, George Shaw, and Peter Brook, the latter claiming that Speaight inspired him to pursue a theatrical career. In 1934, he was received into the Catholic Church and after leaving Bumpus' in 1938 he spent six months as a farm labourer at the sculptor Eric Gill's rural community, Piggotts, in Sussex, where he came upon the idea of writing his book about Punch and Judy while digging potatoes. Published as Punch and Judy: a History in 1970, the book was to be the first serious study on the subject.

Speaight's first association with Benjamin Pollock's Toy Shop came when he gave a toy theatre performance of The Corsican Brothers at The George Inn in Southwark for Benjamin Pollock's 80th birthday in 1936. Speaight was already gaining a reputation for his juvenile drama performances using characters and settings obtained from Pollock's. He gained practical experience with puppetry in 1939 when working with Olive Blackham's Roel Puppets in the Cotswolds.

== War service ==
Speaight undertook wartime service as a conscientious objector, serving with the Auxiliary Fire Service in London before becoming a radio operator for the Royal Navy's Civilian Shore Wireless Service in 1940. Serving at Gibraltar from 1941 to 1943, Speaight transferred to the uniformed service. After being commissioned as a radio operator in 1944 he served on several frigates and took part in the invasion of Normandy before being torpedoed in a naval convoy to Murmansk in 1945.

== Later life ==
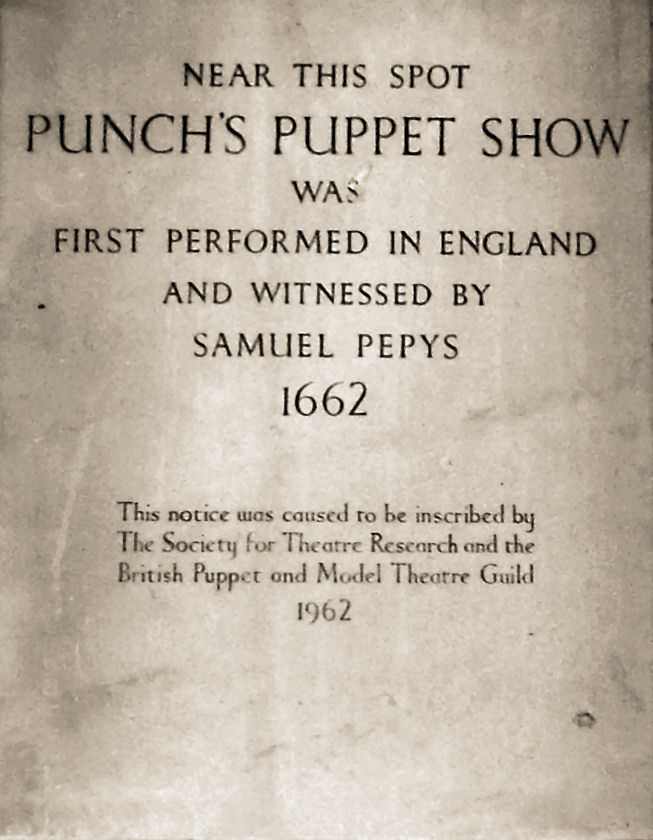
Speaight campaigned for this plaque commemorating the first recorded performance of Punch and Judy in Covent Garden

At the end of World War 2, Speaight and Gerald Morice were contacted by a family who had found a collection of marionettes in a barn. Speaight and Morice examined these and found them to be rare Victorian puppets thought to have been lost or destroyed years before. The two restored the puppets and Speaight, initially with Morice and later other partners, performed with them as the Old Time Marionettes and the Tiller Clowes Puppets at the Battersea Pleasure Gardens for the Festival of Britain in 1951, and later for the Museum of London and for the Theatre Museum.

Speaight's book Juvenile Drama: The History of the English Toy Theatre appeared in December 1946. In the same year he became manager of Benjamin Pollock's Toy Shop. Its owner modernised the stock to appeal to a contemporary audience with, among other innovations, a toy theatre version of the 1948 Laurence Olivier film of Hamlet devised by Speaight. However, the shop was a financial failure and it closed in 1951.

Speaight's next book, History of the English Puppet Theatre, was published in 1955. He then worked as an editor of children's encyclopaedias and reference books, initially at Odhams Press. He later joined George Rainbird's firm where he edited the Catholic Encyclopaedia, before becoming editorial director of Rainbird Reference.

In 1962, Speaight campaigned for an inscribed plaque commemorating Samuel Pepys to be placed was on the wall of St Paul's Church in Covent Garden. In his diary in 1662, Pepys made the first mention of a Punch and Judy show in England at Covent Garden. In 1987, at the 325th anniversary of Pepys' sighting, Speaight dressed as Pepys and took part in the grand procession around Covent Garden complete with quill and diary in his hand.

Speaight retained an interest in the theatre, being a co-founder the London Munich Puppet Players; a founding member of the Society for Theatre Research, editing its journal Theatre Notebook from 1969 to 1976; and producing a catalogue of 19th century plays. He held prominent roles at the Union Internationale de la Marionnette, at the British Puppet and Model Theatre Guild, and as a jury member at the International Festival of Puppet Theatre at Bucharest. He founded or co-founded several other theatrical enterprises, e.g. the "London Puppet Players" with Susanne Forster and Stefan Fichert from Germany. He was a Fellow of the Royal Society of Arts.

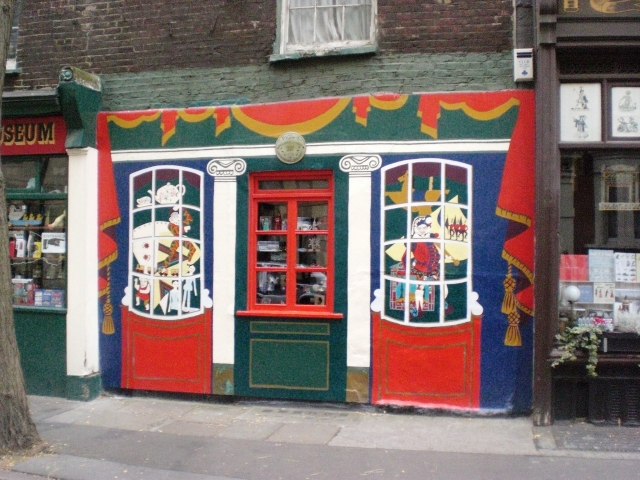
Pollock's Toy Museum - Speaight was to be associated with it for most of his life

In 1968, Speaight became a trustee of Pollock's Toy Museum after its then owner Marguerite Fawdry turned her private museum into an educational charitable trust. He retired as a trustee in 2003 and in his honour Pollock's held the exhibition - 'George Speaight, a Life in Toy Theatre'.

Speaight left reference publishing in 1974, but continued with theatrical activities during a long retirement. In 1980, he published The Book of Clowns and A History of the Circus. The George Speaight Collection of theatrical ephemera and archive material is held by the Department of Theatre and Performance at the Victoria and Albert Museum in London.

In 1946, Speaight married Mary Olive Mudd, a wood engraver. They had two children together, including journalist Margaret Speaight. He died on 22 December 2005, aged 91.
