= Edwin Smith (photographer) =

English photographer (1912–1971)

Edwin George Herbert Smith
- Born: 15 May 1912; Canonbury, Islington, London
- Died: 29 December 1971 (aged 59)
- Education: Northern Polytechnic
- Occupations: Photographer and artist
- Years active: 1935–1971
- Spouses: Rosemary Ansell (m. 1935; div. 1937) Olive Cook (m. 1954–1971)
- Parent(s): Edwin Stanley Smith; Lily Beatrice Smith

Edwin George Herbert Smith (15 May 1912 – 29 December 1971) was an English photographer. He is best known for his distinctive vignettes of English gardens, landscapes, and architecture. On his own or in partnership with his wife, the artist and writer Olive Cook, he authored or contributed to numerous books during his lifetime and his photographs are still regularly used today.

== Biography ==
He was born in Canonbury, Islington, London, the only child of Edwin Stanley Smith, a clerk, and his wife Lily Beatrice, (née Gray). After leaving school he was educated at the Northern Polytechnic, transferring to the architectural school at the age of 16. He then won a scholarship to the Architectural Association, but gave up his course and worked as a draughtsman for several years. He became a freelance photographer in 1935, working briefly for Vogue as a fashion photographer. However he concentrated his artistic efforts on subjects such as the mining community of Ashington in Northumberland, the docks of Newcastle, and circuses and fairgrounds around London.

In 1935 Smith married Rosemary Ansell, but the marriage ended in divorce two years later. By this time Smith was living with Olive Cook, whom he married in 1954. Smith was also a writer, producing photographic handbooks, including All the Photo Tricks (1940), for Focal Press. But it is for his photograph books he is best remembered. These include: English Parish Churches (1952), English Cottages and Farmhouses (1954), The English House Through Seven Centuries (1968), Pompeii and Herculanaeum (1960), Ireland (with Micheal Mac Liammoir) (1966), Scotland (with George Sutherland Fraser) (1967), Rome: From its Foundation to the Present (1971) and England (with Angus Wilson) (1971). Several of these titles were collaborations with his wife; Cook providing the text beside Smith's photography.

Smith was also a prolific artist. He produced water and oil paintings, drawings, linocuts and woodcuts throughout his life, and in later years at Saffron Walden, he drew up architectural plans for local properties.

He became ill in the spring of 1971, but cancer was not diagnosed until a few weeks before his death on 29 December. It was only after his death that exhibitions of Smith's work appeared, with a monograph finally being published in 1984.

After Cook's own death in 2002, her papers and some of those of her husband were placed in Newnham College Archives, Cambridge. Smith's photographic archive was bequeathed to the Royal Institute of British Architects, as were his notebooks containing detailed records of the photographs taken on his travels throughout Britain and Europe. Edwin Smith was also an avid collector and creator of Toy Theatre. On his wife's death, the collection passed to the Pollock's Toy Museum Trust.

A retrospective of Smith's work was presented at RIBA's new Architecture Gallery from 10 September 2014.
