= Gerald Morice =

Gerald Morice

Gerald Charles Trentham Morice (1907-1986) was a journalist, theatre critic and collector of toy theatres and printed ephemera. He was the founder of the British branch of UNIMA, the international puppet organisation and a founder member of the British Model Theatre Guild.

From an aristocratic family with a connection with the Butlin family, Morice was born in Kensington in London in 1907. As a young man Morice collected toy theatres and the printed play and pantomime sheets that went with them. He was a co-founder of the British Puppet and Model Theatre Guild, was its first Secretary and Press Officer, and was the Editor of its Wartime Bulletin’s and The Puppet Master from 1950 - 1952. As a journalist he wrote weekly newspaper articles about the puppet theatre scene, British and European, in the Worlds Fair and in ‘The Stage’, under the name Charles Trentham, his middle names.

During World War II Morice was the BBC Correspondent in Vienna. He was also one of leading authorities on the productions of the Vienna State Opera, and in particular the operettas. At the end of the War Morice and George Speaight were contacted by a family who had found a collection of marionettes in a barn. Speaight and Morice examined these and found them to be rare Victorian puppets thought to have been lost or destroyed years before. The two restored the puppets and performed with them as the Old Time Marionettes and the Tiller Clowes Puppets.

A well-known collector and speaker on Valentine Day cards, greetings cards and paper ephemera, he frequently gave talks on radio and television on the subject. Morice sent regular parcels of such material to the John Johnson Collection of Printed Ephemera at Oxford, now incorporated in the Bodleian Library. In 1969 he was made a Member of Honor of UNIMA. His theatre and puppet collection is in the Victoria and Albert Museum.

Gerald Morice died in 1986 aged 79.
