= Kate Raymond =

American actress

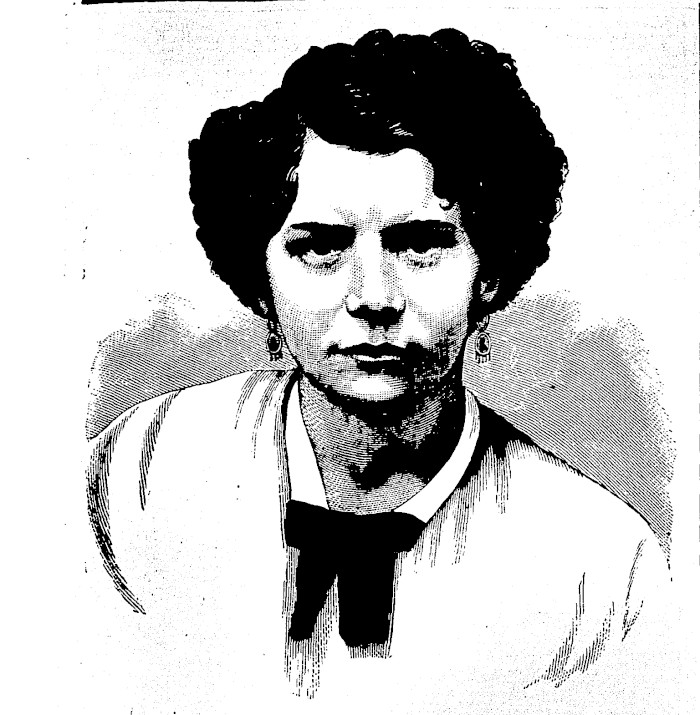
- Sketch of Kate Raymond in the Oct 4, 1879 issue of the New York Clipper
- Born: Marilla Jane Ceas; March 25, 1840
- Died: September 24, 1879 (aged 39); Fernwood, Pennsylvania
- Spouse: O. B. Collins

Kate Raymond (born Marilla Jane Cease; March 25, 1840, in Livingston County, New York), was a dramatic star primarily celebrated for her stage performance of Mazeppa. She made her first appearance as Mazeppa in what was then known as the Continental Theatre; now the Trocadero Theatre, located in Philadelphia, Pennsylvania.

== Stage life ==
Under the management of Allinson & Hincken on January 4, 1864, Raymond played a six-week engagement as Mazeppa; her first appearance on any stage according to her husband O. B. Collins, a stage actor himself. With her husband along with her a large percentage of the time, she traveled around the country performing in equestrian dramas until the season of 1866-7, when she played at the St. Charles Theatre (now demolished, in its place the Orpheum Theatre) in New Orleans, under the management of De Bar & Eddy. In the spring of 1867, along with Wilson's Broadway Theatre Company, she traveled through Canada. From 1867-8, she was soubrette of John Templeton's Company on the Southern circuit. She played a role as Mazeppa for the second time, also under management of Templeton, in the spring continuing into the season of 1868-9 where she did a four-week engagement at the Olympic Theatre (now demolished, most recently called Tivoli Theatre) in Brooklyn, New York, under the management of Donnelly & Hooley in February 1869. She starred in "Jack Sheppard on Horseback," "The French Spy," and similar pieces until 1872, where she made her appearance in a new play written specifically for her by Thad. W. Meighan titled "The Waifs of New York." Her role was Willie the Waif, and it won instantaneous and pronounced success. In July 1874 at the Bella Union Theatre in San Francisco, California, she played for 231 consecutive nights. In the Fall of 1875, she appeared in Liverpool, performing at Theatre Royal (now the location of the Liverpool Football Club store). After appearing in Nottingham, Oldham, and Bolton, she returned to the United States in November 1875, where she starred in "The Waifs of New York" from 1875-6. In the Fall of 1876 she was stock-star at the Holliday Street Theatre in Baltimore, Maryland. In January 1877 she traveled to Liverpool again, playing in the Theatre Royal once more and the Queen's Theatre (closed 1869 - demolished) in Manchester, toured provinces, and returned to the United States in November 1877.

In April 1878, she played in London at the Albion, under the management of Fred Abrams, then toured England and Ireland with her company.

== Personal life and death ==
She married O. B. Collins in April 1864, three months after her first known stage performance. After touring England and Ireland in 1878, illness brought her back to the United States. With her health continuing to dissipate, she was only able to play for four weeks after returning, making her last performance on stage at the Olympic Theatre in Brooklyn, New York on December 28, 1878. She played as Willie the Waif in "The Waifs of New York."

She had suffered three to four years previously with a bronchial affliction, which developed into rapid consumption. She died at her husband's home near Fernwood, Pennsylvania, at ten minutes past 1 o'clock a.m. on September 24, 1879.
