= Olive Blackham =

British puppeteer

- Born: Olive Dingle Blackham; 15 February 1899; West Bromwich, Staffordshire
- Died: 21 June 2002 (aged 103); Malvern, Worcestershire
- Occupation: Puppeteer
- Relatives: Harold Blackham, brother

Olive Blackham (15 February 1899 – 21 June 2002) was a British puppeteer. She was the director of the experimental Roel Puppets theatre company, author of Shadow Puppets (1961) and “one of the leading authorities on all forms of puppetry”. In 1948 she was one of the first puppeteers to appear on television, in a broadcast from Alexandra Palace.

== Personal life ==
Blackham was born in West Bromwich to Harriet and Walter Blackham. She was the oldest of four siblings. A brother was the philosopher Harold John Blackham. Blackham attended King Edward's School, Birmingham, after which she worked for a bank in Birmingham. In 1932 she moved to Roel Farm, Cheltenham where she established the Roel Puppets theatre company. During WWII she worked at Lloyd's Bank in Montpellier.

In the mid-1960s she retired to Cheltenham. After donating her puppets to several museums, she turned her attention to weaving. She died at the Sherborne Tower Care Centre, aged 103. In lieu of flowers, donations were made to the Puppet Centre Trust.

== Puppetry career ==
While working as a bank clerk in the early 1930s, Blackham read a book on puppetry and was inspired to put on a “little show on the dining-room table” for her family. The following year her brother built her a stage, which focused her interest. Eventually “so many friends came to see her puppet, that [she] took a loft over a stable in Kings Heath” in 1927, which became a small experimental theatre, The Ark. The name was inspired by the stable's appearance, its entrance being up a ladder and through a trap door.

== The Ark ==
Blackham ran The Ark with a group of friends, including Bernard Griffin, Gerald Shaw and Frances Norris. Blackham wrote the plays, designed the sets and made the costumes. Of The Ark she said,

"It is not run merely to entertain. It is a puppet theatre workshop where we can experiment in every form of theatre activity in miniature. It is the outcome of a revolt against the cramping conditions the modern playwrights have imposed upon theatre and against the spiritual weariness their fare induces. We are experimenting with puppets in the belief that they can lead the way to a more beautiful and satisfying theatre."

The Ark ran from 1927 to 1932, at which point she decided to give up her job and make puppets her career.

== Roel Puppets Theatre ==
With money she had saved from her work, she moved to the Cotswolds in 1932 and bought a granary belonging to Roel Farm in Guiting Power where she established the Roel Puppets theatre company. Active until 1961, it put on performances each spring and summer, and toured during autumn and winter, playing at theatres, colleges and private houses.

Between 1936 and 1958 Blackham would run an annual summer school where participants would create their own puppets and visit the nearby Lanchester Marionettes Theatre in Malvern. The Roel Puppets’ patron was Sir Barry Jackson. Her long-time assistant was Amina Chatwin. Other puppeteers who worked in the company included: Mary Morley, Joyce Blackham, Gray Skipworth and Robert Tronson.

In 1937 Roel Puppets were chosen by the British Puppet and Model Theatre Guild to represent British puppet theatre at the 1937 Paris Exhibition. In 1939 the theatre historian George Speaight worked with her to learn the art of puppetry.

=== Experimental ideas ===
Blackham “tested the possibilities of the marionette as an art form”. Her experimental ideas included:

- For Alfred Kreymborg's 1925 play Lima Beans, Blackham made faceless puppets; the woman's head was a sphere, the man's was a cube, and “the audience's imagination was stirred to invent features and changes of expression.”
- Rather than making the mannequin's strings as invisible as possible, she experimented with making them thick and “brightly coloured against a neutral background.”
- Rather than using the traditional wooden ‘control’ or ‘perch’ for the strings of marionettes, she attached them to the fingertips of a pair of gloves.

=== World War II ===
During WWII Blackham toured extensively with a simpler theatre using glove puppets, as it was “impossible to obtain the transport for the complicated mechanism necessary for a string show”. In 1939 some of Blackham's students took puppet-making and manipulation techniques into evacuation camps. In November of the same year the Cannon Hall Museum, Birmingham, which was closed at the outbreak of the war, with all its permanent collection moved to safety, reopened with an “exhibition of theatrical designs and puppets”, including puppets made by Blackham.

=== Post-World War II ===
In 1948 the Roel Puppets appeared on a television programme broadcast from Alexandra Palace. Puppet Pie was a 30-minute show featuring Blackham's glove and rod puppets. In the same year she appeared at the Cheltenham Music Festival. In 1950 the Roel Puppets appeared on the BBC show Children's Newsreel. In 1960 Blackham worked with costume designer and Thunderbirds wardrobe supervisor, Elizabeth Coleman. She also worked with Welsh puppeteer Jane Phillips. In 1966, at the point of her retirement, she became the first British member of the French organisation, Union Internationale de la Marionette (UNIMA).

In 1992 three of her Japanese Noh puppets were exhibited at Cheltenham's Pittville Pump Room alongside many other historical puppets, including the original Muffin the Mule.

== Shows ==
Blackham's output was varied, including contemporary verse plays, farces, burlesques, and satires:

=== Pre-war productions ===
- Lima Beans: A Scherzo Play in One Act (1925) by Alfred Kreymborg
- Crescent Theatre, Birmingham (November 1933)
- Municipal Players' Theatre, Birmingham (December 1933)
- Engineer's Institute, Cardiff (November 1934)
- Gloucester School of Art (November 1934)
- Berwick High School (November 1935)
- Unity Theatre Club for the International Puppet Show, London (October 1936)
- Curtain Theatre, Rochdale (October 1936)
- Players' Theatre, Covent Garden (December 1936)
- Bluecoat Hall, Liverpool (January 1937)
- Haileybury College, Hertfordshire (December 1939)

=== Post-war productions ===
- Chester Miracle Plays including Abraham and Isaac in the style of Noh theatre, with figures designed by Bernard Griffin and music by C Sumsion
- The Clown and his Dog
- The Courtship of the Yonghy-Bonghy-Bò
- Dog into Sausage written by Blackham (with paper clowns made by Margaret Hoyland)
- The Early Bird a ballet with music by Paul Dukas
- Hagoromo
- Kinuta – a Noh play with puppets made by Gerald Shaw
- People Who Die by Alfred Kreymborg (with carvings by Gerald Shaw)
- Two medieval Chinese plays including A Princely Fortune
- The Proposal by Anton Chekhov
- Scenes from The Tempest by Shakespeare
- St George and the Turkish Knight mummers' play
- The Unwilling Martyr by Anton Chekhov
- Widecome Fair

== Books ==
Blackham wrote the following books:

- Puppets into Actors (1948) with drawings by F E Norris. Pub. Rockliff
- The Rod Puppets (1949) Pub. W. S. Cowell Ltd.
- Shadow Puppets (1961) with drawings by SKS. Pub. Harper & Brothers

== See also ==
- Horniman Museum collection
- Hogarth, Ann (1985) Fanfare for puppets! A personal and idiosyncratic view of the puppet theatre Pub. David & Charles – for a picture of Noh theatre puppets
- Seager, Donald W. (1952) Marionettes Pub. Studio Publications – for a picture of a Tempest puppet
