= Benjamin Pollock's Toy Shop =

English vintage store

Coordinates: 51°30′43″N 0°07′22″W

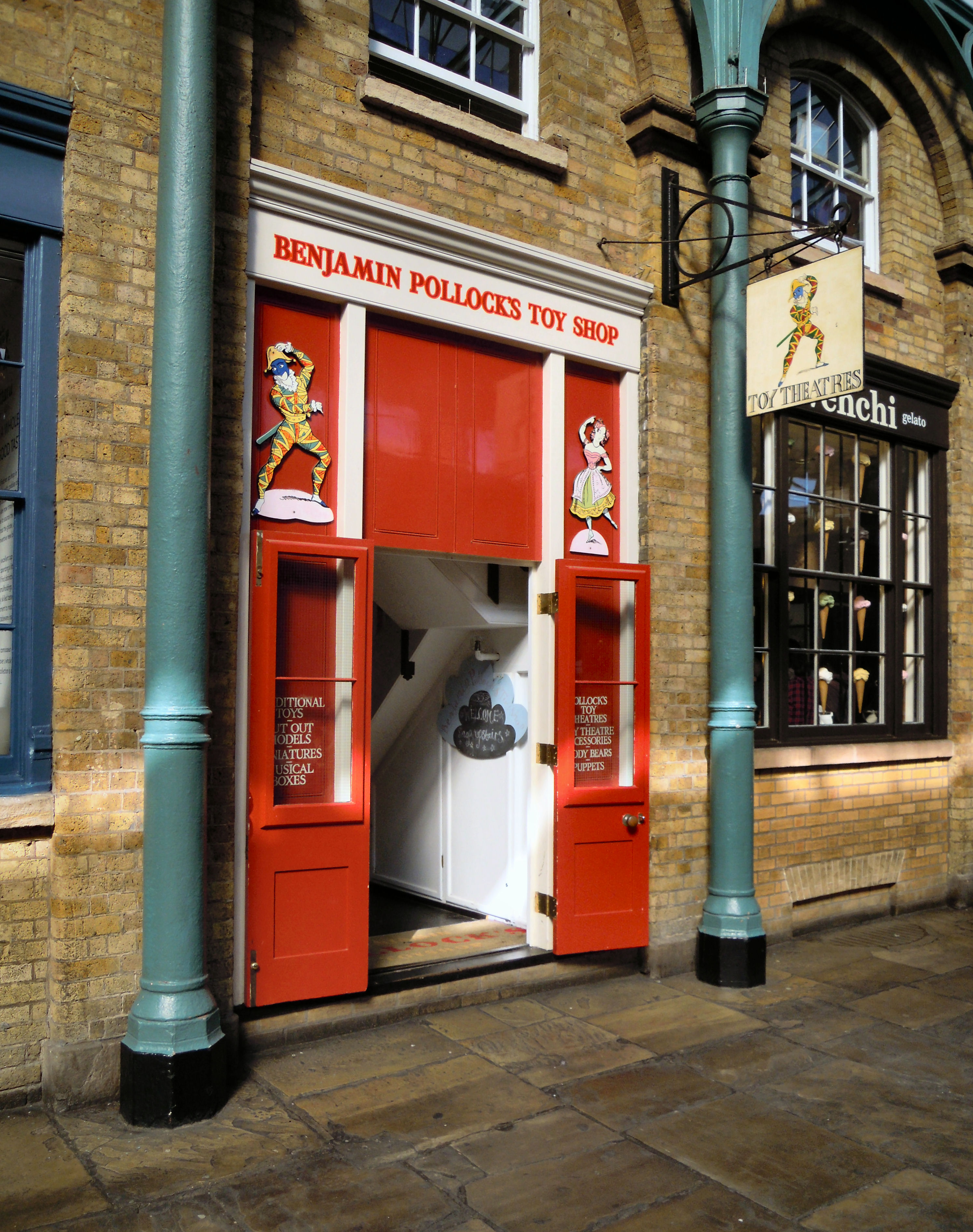
Benjamin Pollock's Toy Shop in Covent Garden

Benjamin Pollock's Toy Shop is a shop selling vintage and retro toys in London's Covent Garden. One of the oldest toy shops in London, it had its origins in Hoxton in 1851 before being taken over in 1877 by Benjamin Pollock, who ran it until his death in 1937. Coronation Street actor Peter Baldwin co-owned the shop from 1988 to his death in 2015. Located at 44 The Market Building, Benjamin Pollock's Toy Shop specialises in Victorian toy theatres, both original and reproduction, in addition to books, puppets, music boxes and other traditional toys.

== History ==
=== The Hoxton shop ===
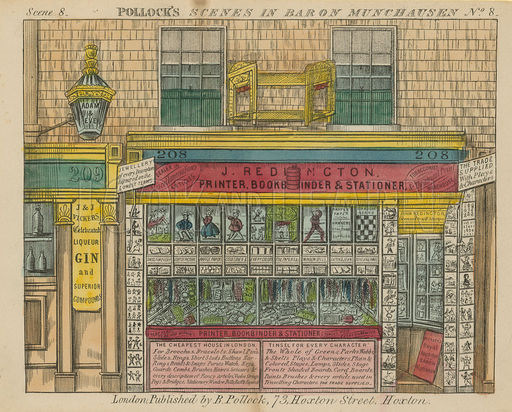
Redington's shop on Hoxton Street as depicted on a "twopence coloured"

Benjamin Pollock stands outside the Hoxton Street shop

John Redington (1819–1876), who described himself as a "Printer, Bookbinder and Stationer; Tobacconist; and Dealer in miscellaneous articles", opened a theatrical print warehouse at 73 Hoxton Street in 1851. Redington was an agent for the toy theatre publisher John Kilby Green, and when Green died in 1860 Redington bought up his engraved copper plates. Redington ran the Hoxton Street business until his death in 1876, following which his widow, youngest son William, and daughter Eliza carried on with the business; but soon only Eliza Redington was left to run the print business.

Eliza Redington married Benjamin Pollock (1856–1937) in 1877, following which they ran the shop together. The couple went on to have eight children – four sons and four daughters. The business that Benjamin Pollock had inherited consisted of the toy theatre sheets of both J. K. Green and J. Redington. The material subsequently sold by Pollock was therefore predominantly from these previous publishers, with the imprint changed to 'B. Pollock'.

During the 1880s Benjamin Pollock's Toy Shop, as it was now known, was still opposite the Britannia Theatre at 73 Hoxton Street in Hoxton. Benjamin Pollock became a maker of toy theatres – or the 'juvenile drama' as it was called at the time, selling toy theatre drops and characters from contemporary dramas for "a penny plain, twopence coloured". Pollock generally republished older plays by using existing plates, simply changing the names of the actors. His version of Cinderella, for example, which could be bought from Pollock in the 1880s, used plates from 1844.

Pollock's business was not a success as tastes in the 1880s changed towards magic lantern shows and other innovations, but when Robert Louis Stevenson visited the shop in 1884 things considerably improved. Stevenson wrote of the shop 'If you love art, folly or the bright eyes of children, speed to Pollock's'. Today a plaque marks the shop's original location on Hoxton Street.

=== Relocations ===
Following the death of Pollock's son William during World War I, his daughter Louise assisted in the business. The theatre historian and writer George Speaight was first associated with Pollock's when he gave a toy theatre performance of The Corsican Brothers at The George Inn in Southwark for Pollock's 80th birthday in 1936. Speaight was already gaining a reputation for his juvenile drama performances using characters and settings obtained from Pollock's.

Following Pollock's death in 1937 his daughters Louise and Selina managed the shop. In 1944 they sold the stock to the bookseller Alan Keen who, operating the business under the name of Benjamin Pollock Limited, moved it to 1 John Adam Street in the Adelphi Building off the Strand just before the Hoxton premises were severely damaged by a bomb.

In 1946 Keen appointed George Speaight as the manager of the shop. Speaight was to be associated with the shop and the museum that later grew from it for the rest of his life. Keen modernised the stock to appeal to a contemporary audience with a toy theatre version of the 1948 Laurence Olivier film of Hamlet devised by Speaight among other innovations. A supporter of the shop at this time was the actor Ralph Richardson, who wrote introductions to the plays. However, the business was a financial failure and in 1950 it moved to smaller premises at 16 Little Russell Street. In 1951 Benjamin Pollock Limited went into receivership.

The bankrupt stock was purchased in 1955 by BBC journalist Marguerite Fawdry, who obtained the shop and its entire stock when trying to buy wire character slides for her son’s toy theatre. She rented a shop at 44 Monmouth Street and moved the business into it. From 1956 it also operated as Pollock's Toy Museum, which today is a small private museum run by the founder's grandson, Eddy Fawdry. In 1957 Benjamin Pollock Limited acquired all of the plates of the publisher George Skelt following his death the year before. A rent rise on the Monmouth Street premises in 1969 and the business passing out of receivership resulted in the museum and toy shop moving to 1 Scala Street, becoming a charitable trust and being renamed Pollock's Toy Theatres Limited.

=== Move to Covent Garden ===
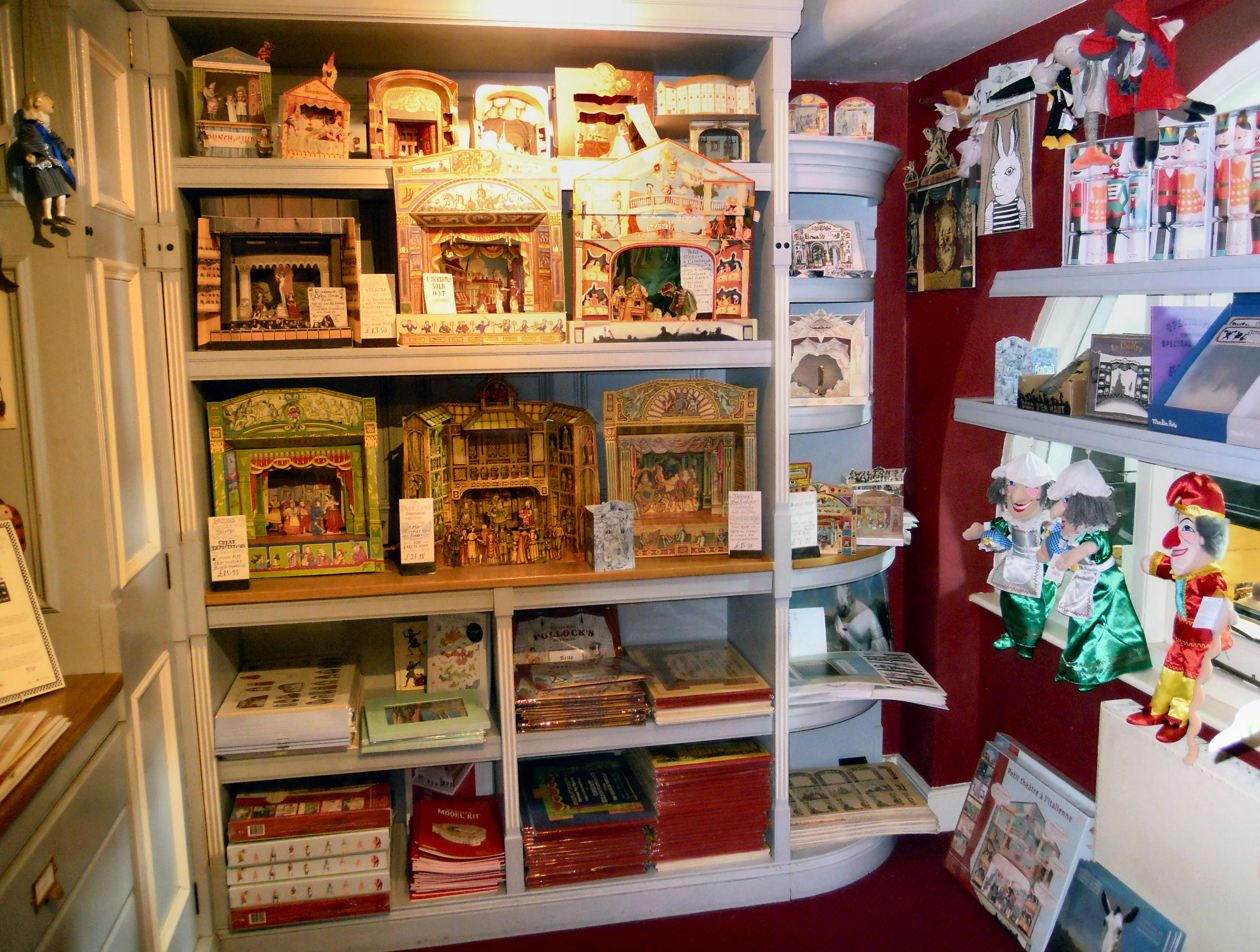
Selection of toy theatres at Pollock's

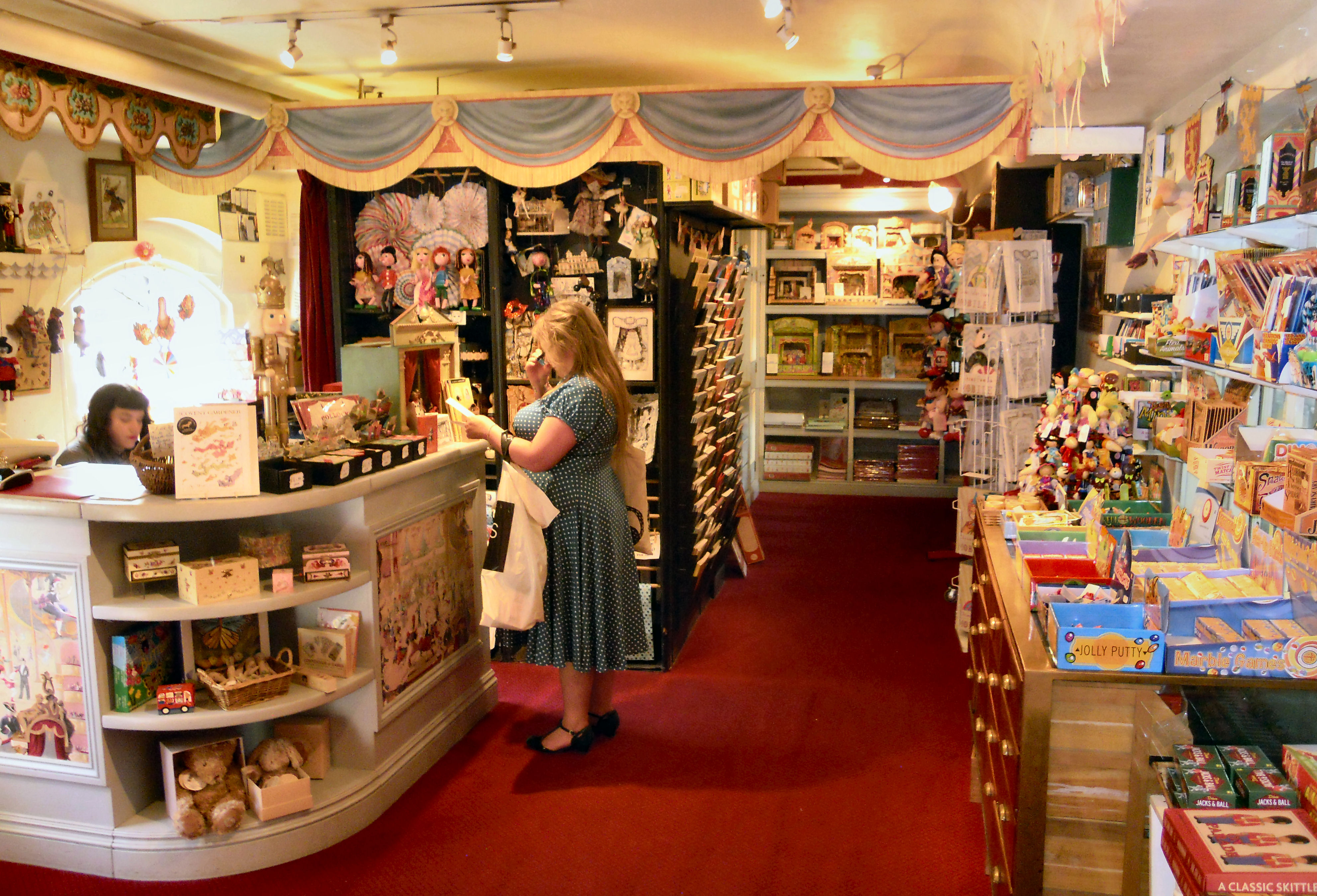
Interior of Benjamin Pollock's Toy Shop in Covent Garden

Under Marguerite Fawdry's ownership Pollock's became one of the first shops to open in the newly renovated Covent Garden Piazza building in 1980. In 1988 she sold the shop to Christopher Baldwin and his brother Peter Baldwin, a toy theatre collector and actor best known for his role of Derek Wilton in the UK soap opera Coronation Street, who had been the shop's manager between acting jobs. In 2008 Christopher Baldwin retired and Louise Heard, who had worked in the shop since the 1980s, became the co-owner with Peter Baldwin. In 2010 they opened a second shop in Stable Yard at Hatfield House. Since Peter Baldwin's death in 2015 the shop has been run by Louise Heard. Adult customers have included Charlie Chaplin and Joanna Lumley.

Today the shop produces its own range of toy theatres by contemporary artists such as Kate Baylay and Clive Hicks-Jenkins which have been displayed at Liberty, Fortnum & Mason and the Royal Opera House. It sells reproduction and original toy theatres from around the world in addition to books, puppets, music boxes and other traditional toys.

== See also ==
- Pollock's Toy Museum
