= The Wizard Skiff =

Play by J.T. Haines

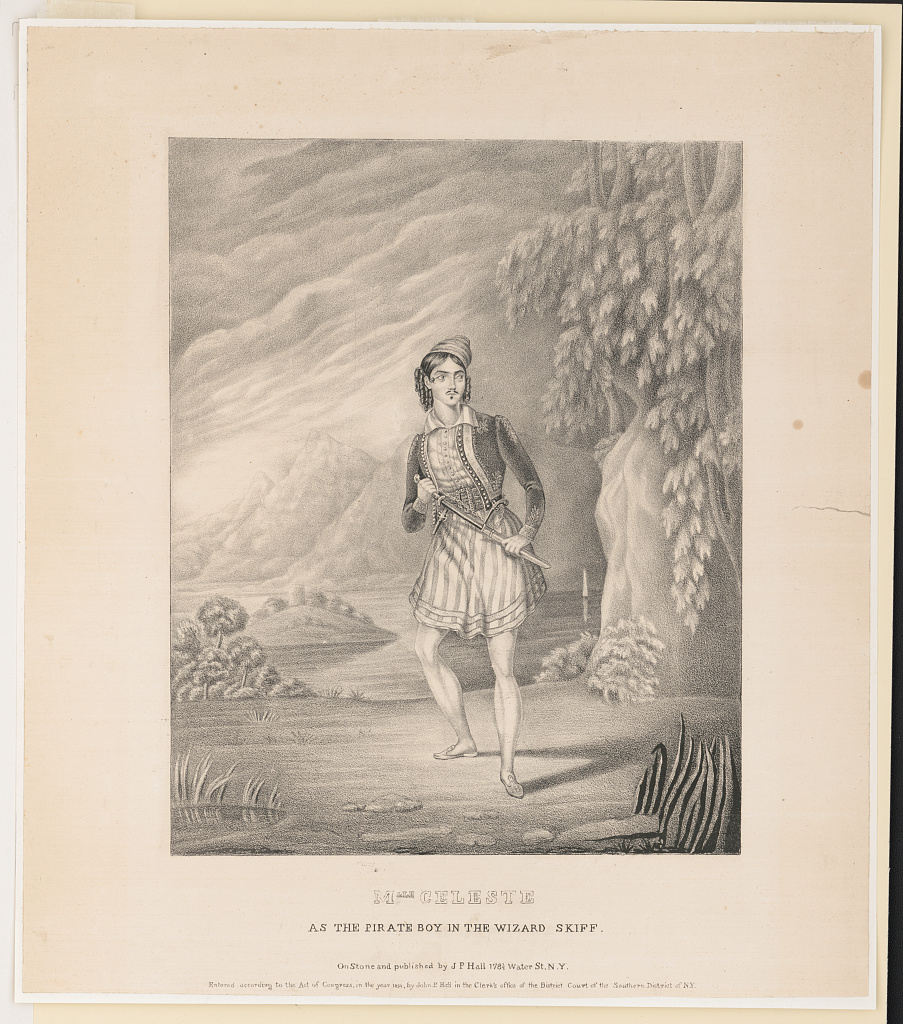
- The actress and dancer Céline Céleste as "The Pirate Boy" in The Wizard Skiff
- Original title: The Wizard Skiff; or, The Tongueless Pirate Boy
- Original language: English
- Written by: J.T. Haines

Premiere
- Date: 26 September 1834
- Place: Bristol Old Vic, London, England

The Wizard Skiff is a British play written by J.T. Haines in the 1830s.

== Background ==
Haines created the nautical melodramatic romance titled The Wizard Skiff; or, The Tongueless Pirate Boy in the early 1830s. A travesti role created for Céline Céleste, she took on the roles of Alexa Mavrona, a Greek lady; Alexis, the leader of the Wizard Skiff; and Agata, a Zingari boy. It was performed by her in Paris and London.

Madame Céleste had once performed The Wizard Skiff 150 times in one year.

== Synopsis ==
The play was set along a coastal Russian military village and featured a villain who posed as a Muslim Russian count, with a backstory of exterminating a Greek Archon and his family, sparing only a baby girl named Alexa whose tongue was cut out.

== Roles ==
Based on a performance at the Bristol Old Vic on 26 September 1834, the cast was the following: Greek characters included:

- Alexa Mavrona, a Greek lady (Madame Céleste)
- Alexis, Chief of the Wizard Skiff (Madame Céleste)
- Agata, A Zingaro boy (Madame Céleste)
  - Constantine, an aged priest (Mr. Mude) and Agnosti, his son, disguised as Paul, mate of the Skiff (Mr. Rénaud)
  - Anastasius (Mr. Trewren)
  - Michael (Mr. Millar)

Russian Characters included:

- Count Beregenoff, Russian Noble, formerly in Turkish Service (Mr. Grainger) and Wolfo, his serf and confidant (Mr. Carroll)
  - Vern Waddledorf, Mayor of the District (Mr. Gardner)
  - Fritz, an old peasant (Mr. Bedford)
  - Paulina, niece to the mayor (Miss Jarman)

== Adaptations ==
Variations of the play were titled The Wizard Skiff; or, The Tongueless Pirate Boy and The Wizard Skiff; or, The Massacre of Scio.

Marietta Ravel's production of The Wizard Skiff occurred in 1866.
