= The French Spy =

Play by J.T. Haines

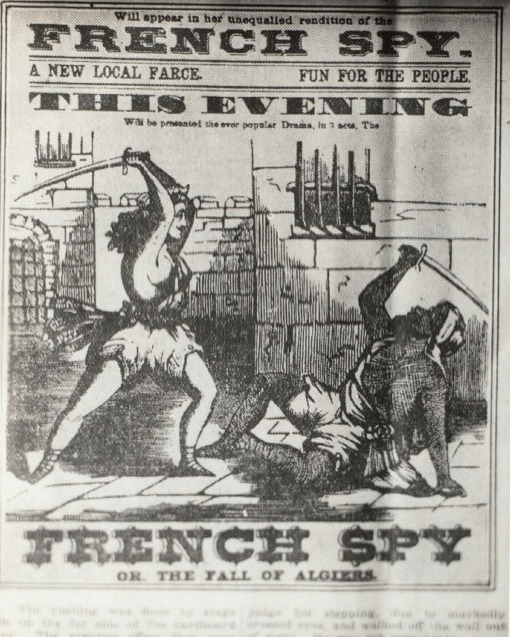
- Original title: The French Spy; or, The Fall of Algiers
- Original language: English
- Written by: J.T. Haines
- Based on: Invasion of Algiers
- Genre: Pantomime

Premiere
- Date: 1831
- Place: London, England

The French Spy; or, The Fall of Algiers is a pantomimic drama written by J.T. Haines in the 1830s.

== Background ==
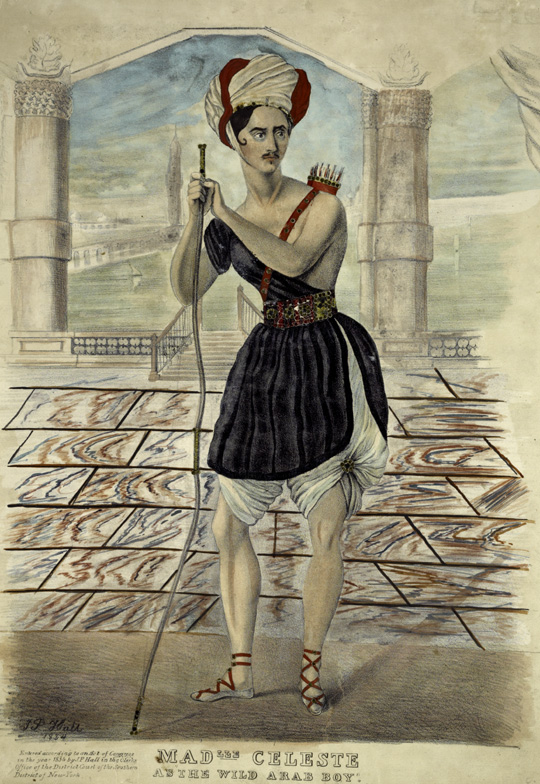
Céline Céleste as "The Wild Arab Boy" in The French Spy

John Thomas Haines authored the pantomime titled The French Spy in the early 1830s, a military drama reflecting the French occupation of Algiers, created for Madame Céleste. Written in 1831, the script required Mme. Céleste to play a travesti role and portray multiple characters. Haines' 20-page stage direction script was notably elaborated upon by Celeste. Madame Céleste had once performed The French Spy 200 times in one year.

The original characters included Mathilde de Grammont, the heroine, who assumed the characters of Pierre Graziot, a cadet of the Lancers, and Omar Almorid, an Arab boy.

== Adaptations ==
During the 19th century, the work saw many performances and adaptations with a variety of subtitles in various combinations.

The play was revived in 1837 as The French Spy; or, The Siege of Constantina with the same three roles: the spy, an Arab boy, and the heroine Mathilde. Samuel French Ltd. published The French Spy; or, The Siege of Constantina: A Military Drama, in Three Acts.

French dancer Marietta Ravel's production of The French Spy occurred in 1866.
