= Olive Cook =

English writer and artist

- Born: Olive Muriel Cook; 20 February 1912; Chesterton, Cambridge, England
- Died: 2 May 2002 (aged 90); Saffron Walden, Essex, England
- Education: The Perse School; Newnham College, Cambridge
- Occupations: Writer, artist
- Spouse: Edwin Smith (m. 1954–1971)

Olive Muriel Cook (20 February 1912 – 2 May 2002), was an English writer and artist who published county guides, as well as writing various books accompanied by the work of her husband, the photographer Edwin Smith.

== Early life ==
Olive Muriel Cook was born on 20 February 1912, at 43 Garden Walk, Chesterton, Cambridge, the daughter of Arthur Hugh Cook, an assistant at Cambridge University Library, and his wife Kate (née Webb). She won scholarships to The Perse School and Newnham College, Cambridge, where she earned a bachelor's degree in Modern Languages.

In 1945 she resigned her post as Supervisor of Publications at the National Gallery in order to paint and write. Her paintings were hung in public and private collections in England, and her writings included children's books, articles in The Saturday Book, and several books on places and buildings, two of which - "English Cottages and Farmhouses" and "English Abbeys and Priories" - were written in conjunction with the photographer Edwin Smith, whom she married in 1954.

Cook also wrote the seminal book "Movement in Two Dimensions", an authoritative research on the pre-cinema technologies of optical toys and chronophotography.

== Career ==
After Cambridge, Cook worked for the publishers Chatto and Windus as a typographer. She moved to the National Gallery, where she was employed as supervisor of publications, under Kenneth Clark, and was involved in the removal of its collections to Blaenau Ffestiniog in anticipation of World War II. During the war some of her watercolours were acquired for the Recording Britain project.

After the war, Cook worked as a freelance writer and artist. In 1948 she wrote the guidebook Suffolk which was illustrated by Rowland Suddaby (part of the Vision of England series), and in 1953 the Cambridgeshire: Aspects of a County in 1953. She married the photographer Edwin Smith in 1954. She published Breckland in 1956, in the Regional Books series.

Cook often worked in conjunction with her husband, Edwin Smith, providing the text in books where he took the photographs, such as Leonard Russell's annual The Saturday Book from 1944 to the 1960s, the English Parish Churches series (1950), English Cottages and Farmhouses (1954), English Abbeys and Priories (1961) and The Wonders of Italy (1963).

Cook was part of the campaign against the building of Stansted Airport, and wrote The Stansted Affair, published in 1967, with a foreword by John Betjeman, and reviewed as a "telling angry indictment".

== Personal life ==
Cook shared a house on Church Row in Hampstead with fellow artist Malvina Cheek in the late 1940s. In 1954, Cook married the photographer Edwin Smith. In 1962, they moved to Saffron Walden, firstly to a tall house on the corner of Audley Road and East Street, and later into the Coach House at the Vineyards on Windmill Hill.

== Later life ==
Cook died of cancer on 2 May 2002 at Saffron Walden Community Hospital, Saffron Walden. The papers of Cook and her husband were donated to Newnham College.
