= Legend of the Christmas Spider =

Eastern European Christmas folktale

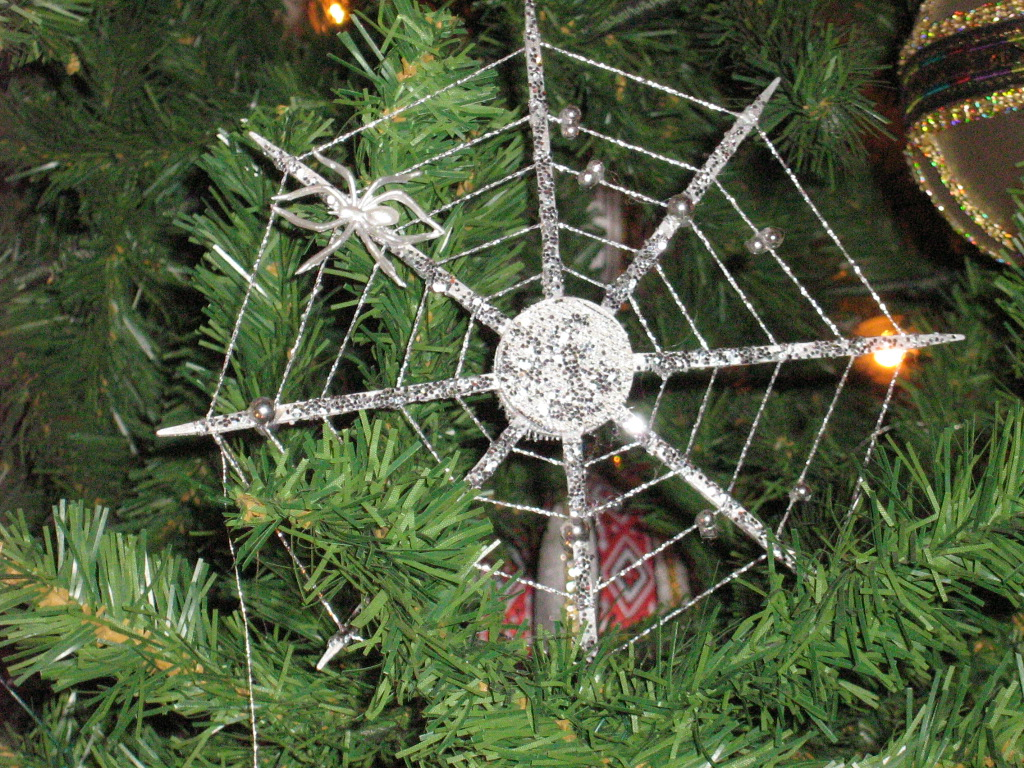
- A Ukrainian spider web ornament from the Christmas Around the World 2007 exhibit of the Museum of Science and Industry, Chicago

Folk tale
- Name: Legend of the Christmas Spider
- Country: Ukraine, Germany, Poland, Denmark, Norway, Sweden, Finland, Russia and eastern Slovakia
- Region: Europe

The Legend of the Christmas Spider is an Eastern European folktale which explains one possible origin of tinsel on Christmas trees. It is most prevalent in Western Ukraine, where small ornaments in the shape of a spider are traditionally a part of the Christmas decorations.

== Story ==
A poor but hardworking widow once lived in a small hut with her children. One summer day, a pine cone fell on the earthen floor of the hut and took root. The widow's children cared for the tree, excited at the prospect of having a Christmas tree by winter. The tree grew, but when Christmas Eve arrived, they could not afford to decorate it. The children sadly went to bed and fell asleep. Early the next morning, they woke up and saw the tree covered with cobwebs. When they opened the windows, the first rays of sunlight touched the webs and turned them into gold and silver. The widow and her children were overjoyed. From then on, they never lived in poverty again.

== Variants ==
Other versions replaces sunlight with a miracle from Father Christmas, Santa Claus, or the Child Jesus, and tells the story primarily from the perspective of the spiders who wished to see the Christmas tree.

== Origins ==
The origins of the folk tale are unknown, but it is believed to have come from either Germany or Ukraine. In Germany, Poland, and Ukraine, finding a spider or a spider's web on a Christmas tree is considered good luck. Ukrainians also create small Christmas tree ornaments in the shape of a spider (known as pavuchky, literally "little spiders"), usually made of paper and wire. They also decorate Christmas trees with artificial spider webs. The tradition of using tinsel is also said to be because of this story.

According to Lubow Wolynetz, folk art curator at the Ukrainian Museum, New York City, the tradition is Ukrainian and dates back to the late 1800s or early 1900.

It may be based on an older European superstition about spiders bringing luck (though not black spiders in Germany), or conversely that it is bad luck to destroy a spider's web before the spider is safely out of the way.

== Fictional works ==
The Christmas Spider has been retold and adapted in works of fiction:

- In 2001, Shirly Climo wrote "Cobweb Christmas: The Tradition of Tinsel" with illustrations by Jane Manning.
- In 2011, Trinka Hakes Noble retold the story in her book, "A Christmas Spider's Miracle.".
- In 2014, the story was told by Angela Yuriko Smith and Robin Wiesenthal as "The Christmas Spiders."
- The story was retold in 2020 as "Tinsel the Christmas Spider" by author Pamela K. Pfertsh, illustrated by Fina Tedesco.
- In 2020, Faith McDowell told the story as "The Christmas Spider."
- In 2021, Miriam Monette told the story as "The Christmas Spider: the Nativity Story Retold for Children" featuring the Christmas Spider as a visitor to Bethlehem.
- In 2022, Andrew Gorman told the story as "The Legend of the Christmas Spider."
- In 2023, Sarah Copeland wrote "The Christmas Spider" featuring a spider rejected by its family.

== See also ==
- Ukrainian fairy tale
- Category:Ukrainian fairy tales
- Cultural depictions of spiders
- "The Fir-Tree", Hans Christian Andersen tale about a Christmas tree
- Ukrainian folklore
