= H. J. Blackham =

British philosopher, writer and educationalist (1903–2009)

Harold John Blackham
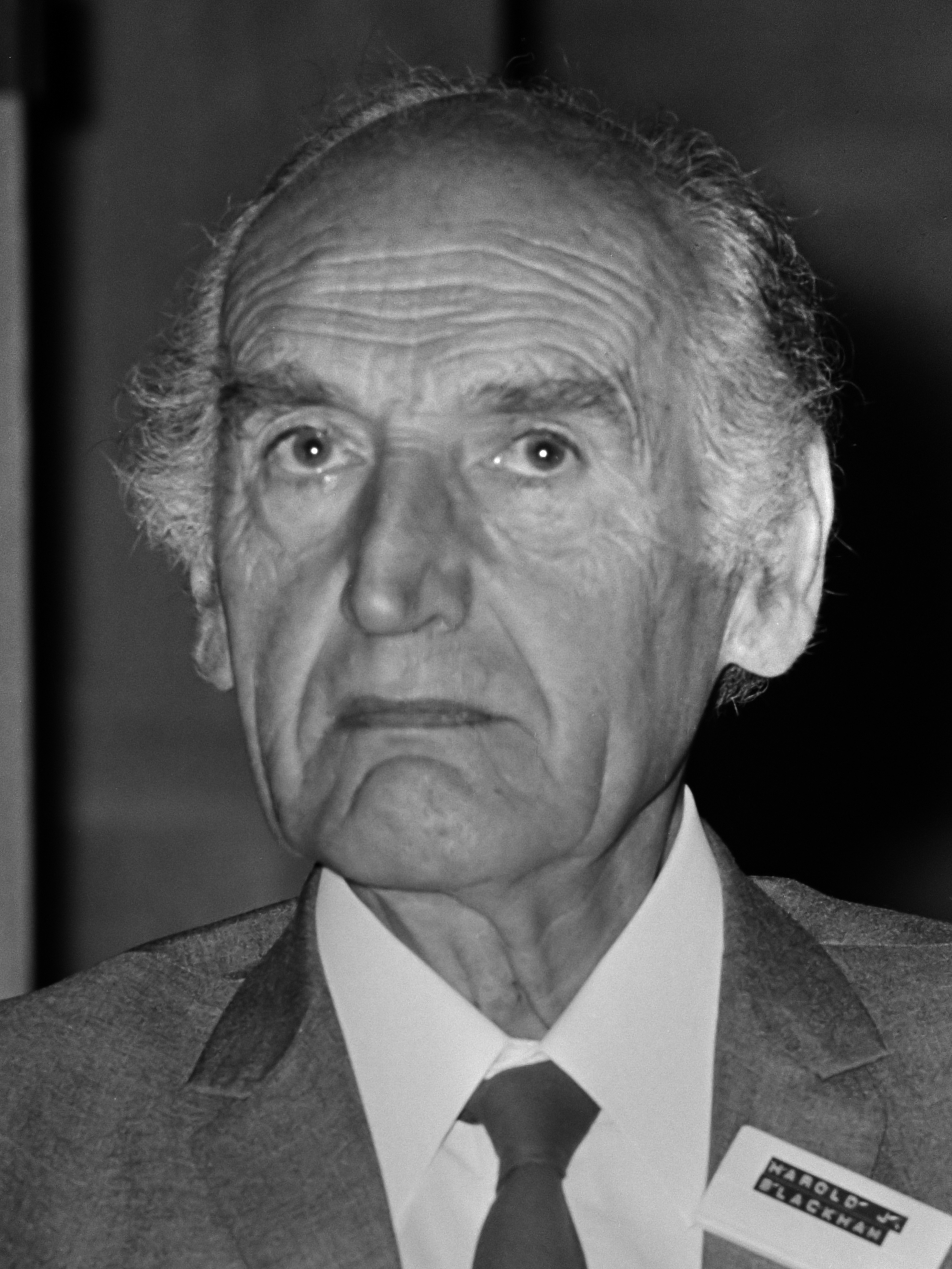
- Harold Blackham (1974)
- Born: 31 March 1903; West Bromwich, Staffordshire, England
- Died: 23 January 2009 (aged 105); Brockhampton, Herefordshire, England
- Occupations: Writer and philosopher

Harold John Blackham (31 March 1903 – 23 January 2009) was a British humanist philosopher, writer and educationalist. He has been described as the "progenitor of modern humanism in Britain".

== Life and career ==
Blackham was born in West Bromwich, Staffordshire, on 31 March 1903, to Harriet Mary (1872–1955) and Walter Roland Blackham (1875–1911). His siblings were the puppeteer Olive Dingle Blackham (1899–2002), Lorna Langstone Blackham (1900–1992), Sylvia Kerslake Blackham (1907–2000), and Joyce Maude Blackham (1909–1993). Blackham left school following the end of World War I, and became a farm labourer, before gaining a place at Birmingham University to study divinity and history. He acquired a teaching diploma and was the divinity master at Doncaster Grammar School.

Joining the Ethical Union, Blackham drew the organisation further away from religious forms and played an important part in its formation into the British Humanist Association, becoming the BHA's first Executive Director in 1963. He was also a founding member of the International Humanist and Ethical Union (IHEU), IHEU secretary (1952–1966), and received the IHEU's International Humanist Award in 1974, and the Special Award for Service to World Humanism in 1978. In addition he was one of the signatories to the Humanist Manifesto.

During his time at the Ethical Union/BHA, Blackham co-founded the British Association for Counselling and Psychotherapy, and as chairman of the Friends of Austria assisted Austrian children fleeing the Nazis to come to the UK.

His book, Six Existentialist Thinkers, became a popular university textbook.

In 1977, Blackham retired to the Wye valley. He suffered a stroke in 2000, and died at a care home in Brockhampton, Herefordshire, on 23 January 2009, aged 105.

== Selected publications ==
- Bury, JB, with an historical epilogue by HJ Blackham. A History of Freedom of Thought (2001). University Press of the Pacific. ISBN 0-89875-166-7
- The Future of our Past: from Ancient Greece to Global Village (1996). Prometheus Books. ISBN 1-57392-042-8
- The Fable as Literature (1985). London: Athlone Press. ISBN 0-485-11278-7
- Education for Personal Autonomy: Inquiry into the School's Resources for Furthering the Personal Development of Pupils (editor) (1977). London: Bedford Sq. Press. ISBN 0-7199-0937-6
- Humanists and Quakers: an exchange of letters (with Harold Loukes) (1969). Friends Home Service. ISBN 0-85245-011-7
- Humanism (1968). London: Penguin. (published by Harvester in hardback, 1976, ISBN 0-85527-209-0)
- Religion in a Modern Society (1966). London: Constable.
- Objections to Humanism (editor) (1963). London: Constable. ISBN 0-09-450170-X (published in paperback by Penguin, 1965, ISBN 0-14-020765-1)
- Political Discipline in a Free Society: The Sustained Initiative (1961). London: Allen & Unwin.
- The Human Tradition (1953). London: Routledge.
- Six Existentialist Thinkers (1952). London: Routledge. ISBN 0-7100-1087-7
- Living as a Humanist: Essays (1950). London: Chaterson.

== See also ==
- Barbara Smoker, also a humanist who published Blackham's Best.
