= Tinsel print =

Type of print

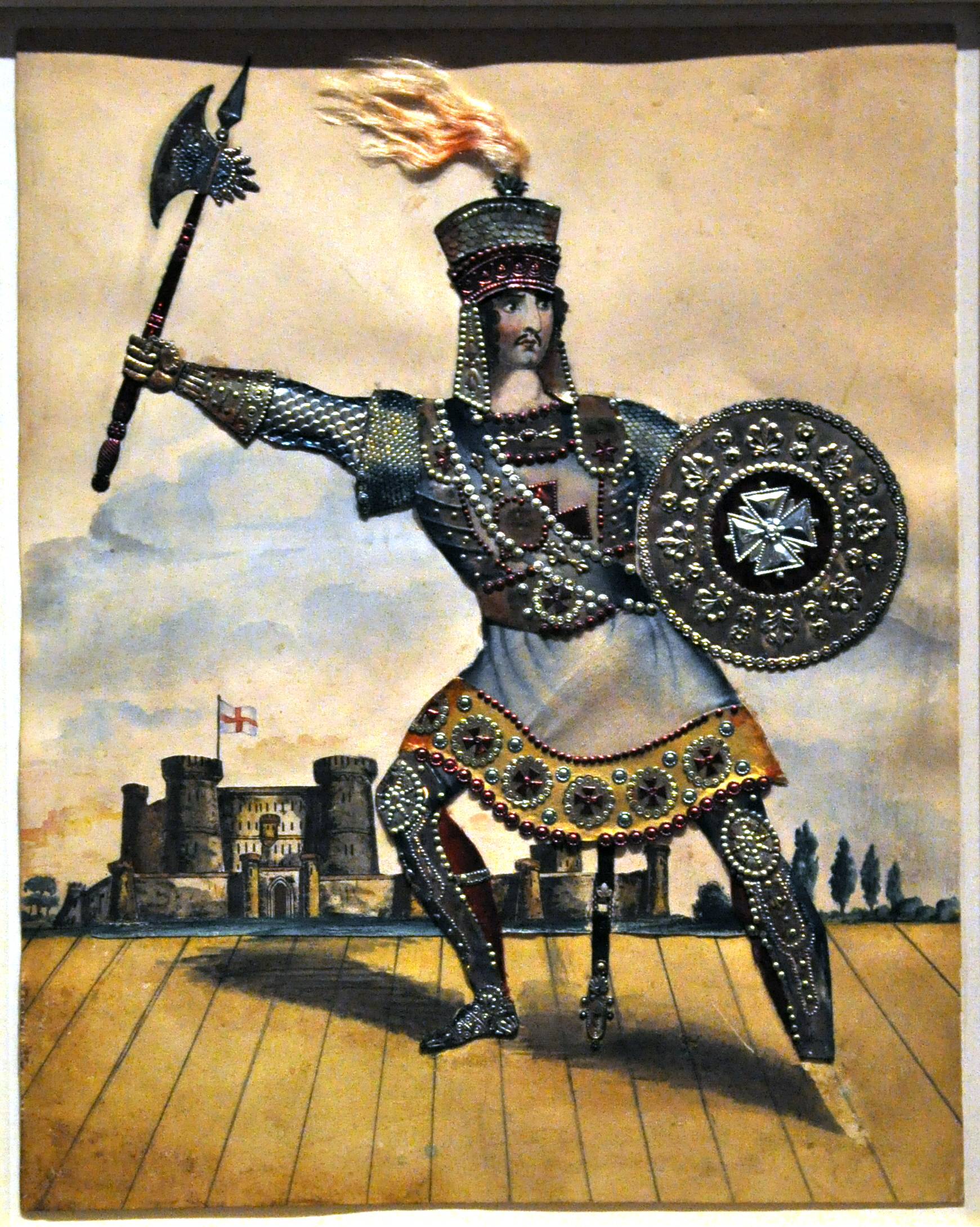
Tinsel print of the English actor John Thomas Haines in character as Brian de Bois-Guilbert in Ivanhoe, about 1830

A tinsel print is a print where tinsel is added after printing, for decorative effect, it is made in two ways.

The first is a rare type of old master print parts of which are decorated with small thin shiny fragments of metal or quartz crystal applied to glue. Gold leaf fragments were used on some, and colour was applied before the tinsel. Arthur Mayger Hind cites fewer than ten examples as being "practically all whose location is known... all seem to date between about 1430 and 1460". All are religious woodcuts, and probably German in origin, perhaps from Augsburg. They intended to imitate fabric, which was also the intention of the related "flock prints", printed in glue on paper that had been impressed on fabrics, and then sprinkled with chopped wool.

The second type are popular prints, mainly British, produced in the early or mid-19th century, normally showing actors in their roles, though Napoleon I in his study was another subject. These were sold in plain or hand-coloured and tinselled versions, and the plain versions were often tinselled at home. Tin-foil tinsel in different colours, mostly in pre-stamped shapes, was applied with glue. The theatrical prints cost one penny plain, and two coloured, with a standard size of about 12 by 10 inches (250 x 200 mm). Actors, whether heroes or villains, were more often represented than actresses. The artists are not named but the prolific political cartoonist and illustrator George Cruikshank is suspected of being involved.

Many prints also used fabric pieces and other additions (such as the plume of Mr Haines' helmet above). Prints with fabric are called "dressed prints"; this seems to have begun in 18th-century France as a hobby, mainly on devotional images. The same technique became popular for the smaller cut-out figures used in toy theatres, a craze of the period. A wide range of supplies for home-tinselling were available, or pre-tinselled figures could be bought.

Tinsel printing can also refer to Indian techniques for fabric.

== Collections ==
Though popular in their day, theatrical tinsel prints were often not valued, and can deteriorate if not well looked after. They are now rare, especially in good condition. There are collections in the Victoria and Albert Museum in London, the Cooper–Hewitt, Smithsonian Design Museum in New York, and the Folger Shakespeare Library was given a collection of 53 examples in 2003.

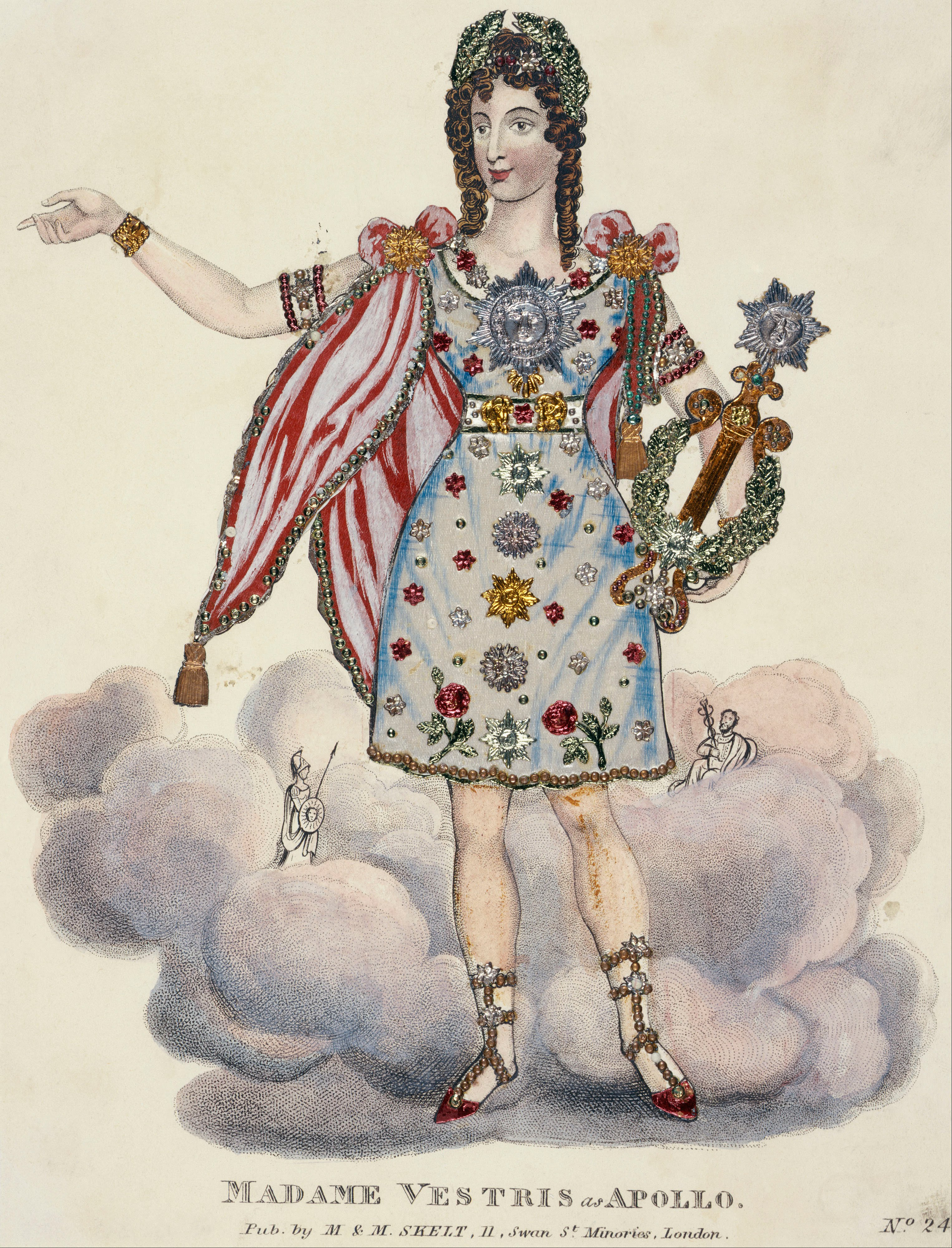
Madame Vestris as Apollo, English, 1837-40. Published by Skelt, Martin and Matthew

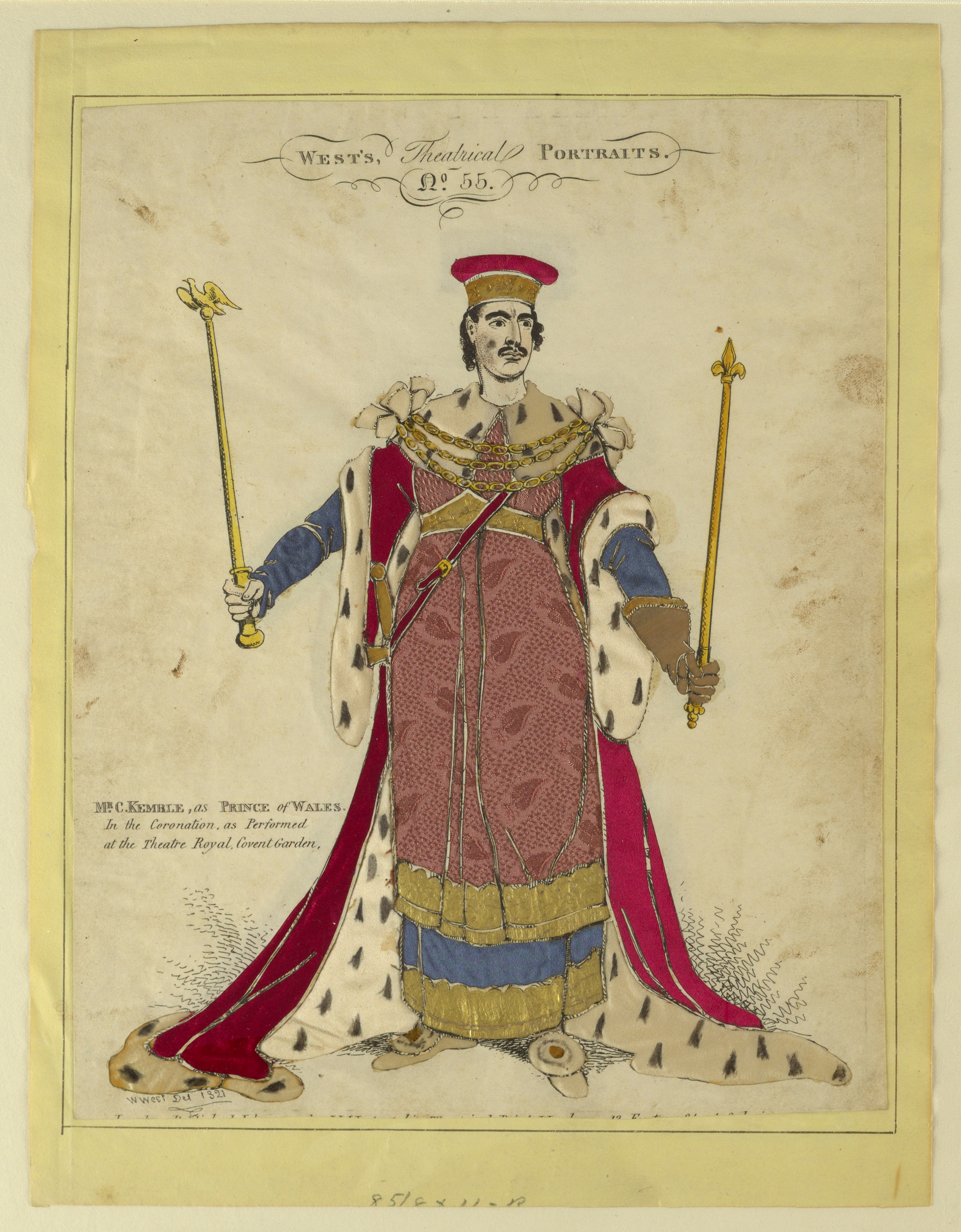
Charles Kemble as the Prince of Wales, 1821. There is limited tinsel, but much glued-on fabric. Inscribed "West's theatrical Portraits / no. 55".

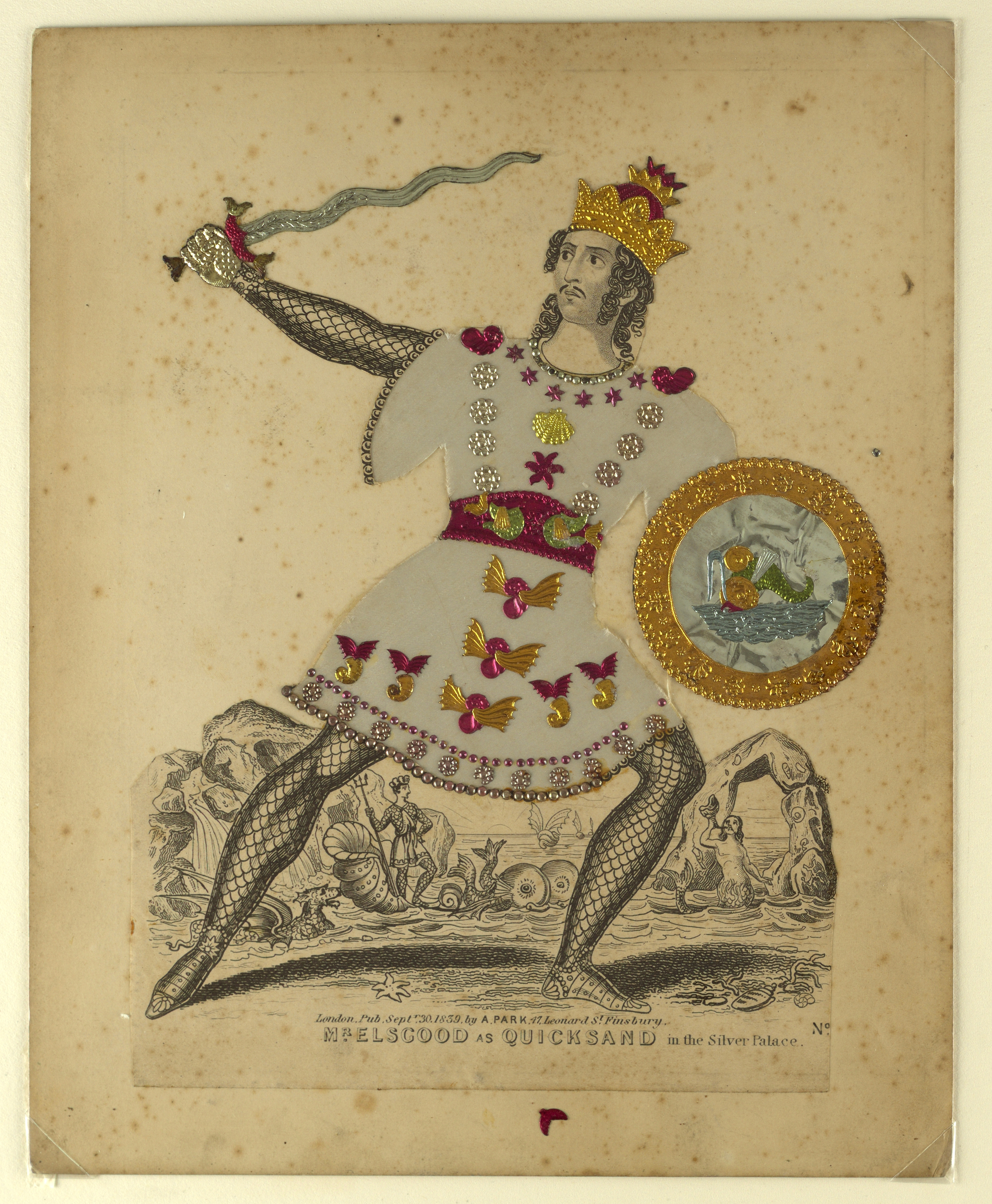
"Mr. Elsgood as Quicksand in The Silver Palace", dated 1859

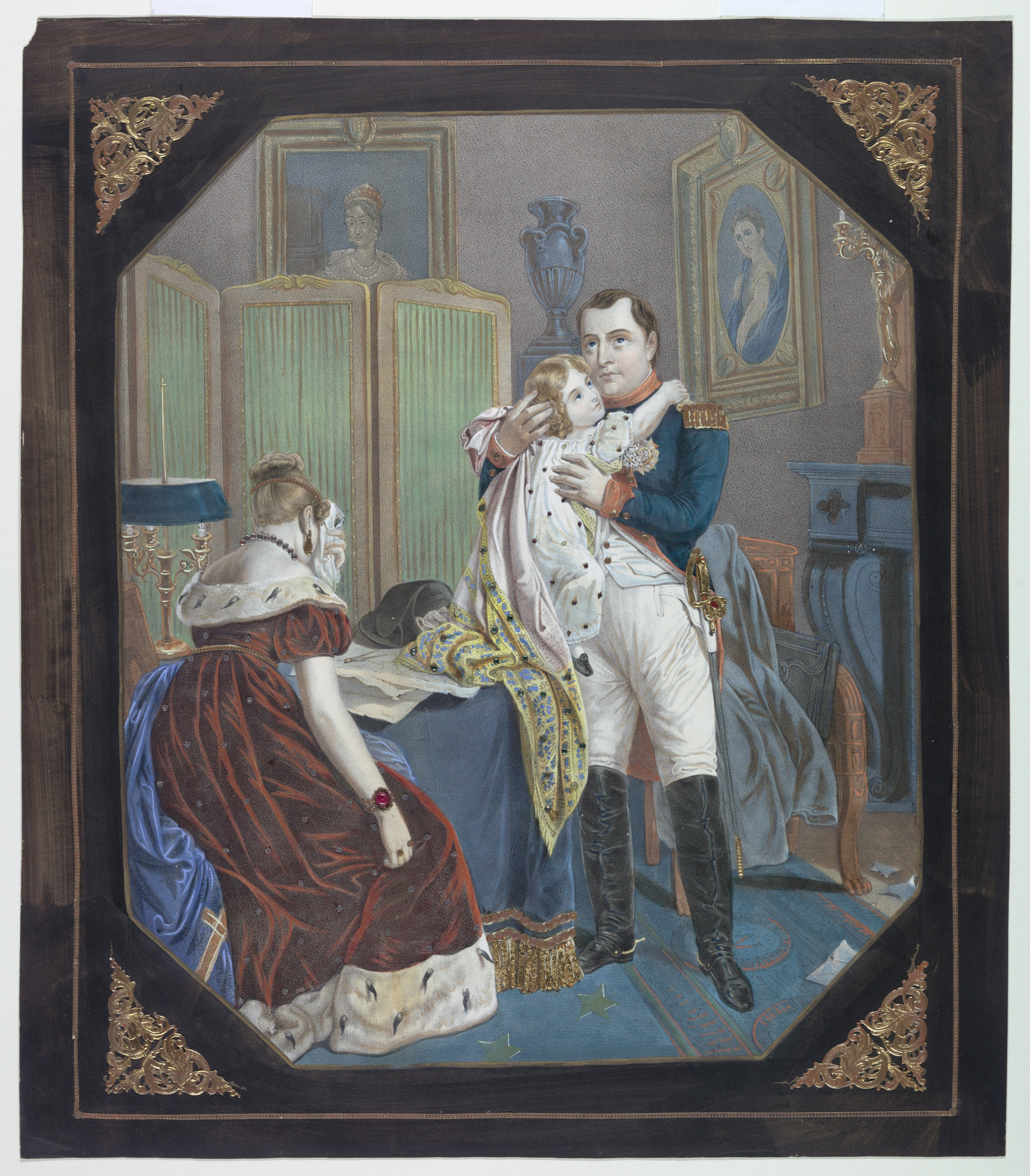
Napoleon I and his family, "hand-colored lithograph, with applied, machine-cut, embossed gold paper, shredded mica and pailettes", on paper, c. 1860, English. The tinsel additions are limited to jewellery etc, and the frame.

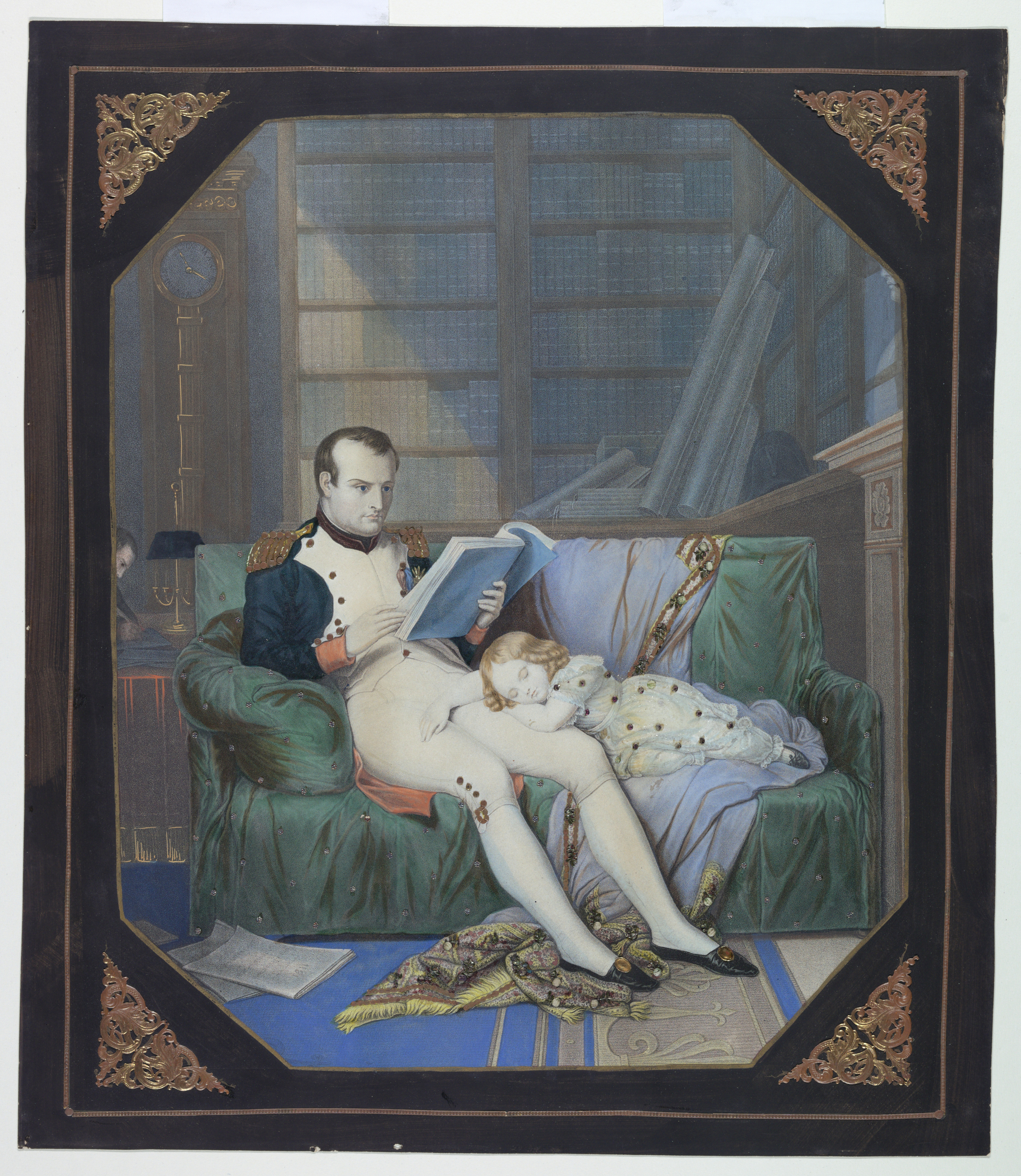
Napoleon in His Study, c. 1860, matching previous
