= Madame Céleste =

French dancer and actress

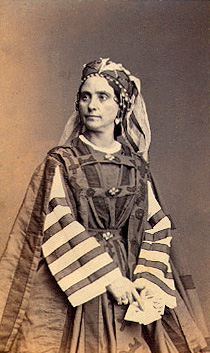
- Madame Céline Céleste
- Born: Céline Céleste-Elliott; 16 August 1814; Paris, France
- Died: 12 February 1882 (aged 67); Paris, France
- Other name: Madame Céline Céleste
- Occupation: Dancer

Céline Céleste-Elliott (16 August 1814? Paris – 12 February 1882, Paris), known professionally as Madame Céleste, was a French dancer and actress who enjoyed great success on the London stage and during her four tours of America. She was also later involved in theatrical management. On her retirement from the stage she returned to Paris where she died in 1882.

== Early life and career ==
As a little girl Céleste showed early talent and was enrolled at the Paris conservatory as a pupil, performing with Francois-Joseph Talma. In 1827 she made her debut at the Bowery theatre, New York, dancing a pas seul with a Parisian dance troupe, and also appearing in ballets at smaller venues on the east coast. While in America she married Henry Elliott of Baltimore, by whom in 1829 she had a daughter. Elliott died soon after the marriage.

== Career ==
Travelling to England, she appeared first at Liverpool as Fenella in Masaniello in the opera by Auber; the part of Fenella, mute sister of the opera's hero, allowed Celeste to display her considerable talent as a mime artist, and also disguised her poor command of English.

Moving from the provinces into London she had her first great success there at Easter 1831 in a topical play called The French Spy, in which she played a travesti role as Hamet, an "Arab Boy" (actually a French girl in disguise). The play was based on the recent French takeover of Algiers and the part was created especially for Céleste by J.T. Haines, the first of several playwrights to create roles capitalizing on her strengths in expressive movement.

After appearing both in continental Europe and Ireland, in 1834 she again toured America for three years, where she aroused great enthusiasm and made a small fortune. She became famous there for her pantomimic roles, appearing in The Wizard Skiff, or, The Tongueless Pirate Boy; an adaptation of a Fenimore Cooper novel, The Wept of Wish-ton-Wish; and The Dumb Brigand. On July 21, 1835, Madame Céleste made her Montreal debut in The Wizard Skiff.

It is said that her American admirers carried her on their shoulders and took the horses out of her carriage in order to pull it themselves. It is even said that President Andrew Jackson introduced her to his cabinet as an adopted citizen of the Union.

Céleste was to make further U.S. tours in 1842, 1851 and 1865.

Having made a good profit from her American tour she returned to England in 1837, appearing in London as Maurice, a dumb boy in J.R.Planché's The Child of the Wreck. Planché wrote the play around her, and it ran for an impressive forty nights at Drury Lane, and Céleste's performance was praised by the reviewer of The Times(London). She now gave up dancing, and concentrated on acting and theater management.

In 1843 she joined Benjamin Webster in the management of the Theatre Royal, Liverpool, and later at the Adelphi in London. They produced a series of successful domestic dramas, usually with Céleste in the leading role, and many written by John Baldwin Buckstone, who created Céleste's best-known and favorite role of Miami, the half-Native American, half-French heroine of The Green Bushes (1845). Miami, who at one point kills her unfaithful Irish lover but later atones by returning his child to its homeland, is a 'subtle blend of sympathetic innocence and raw, almost anarchic energy'.

Céleste and Webster became lovers, and by 1869 their liaison seems to have been generally known and accepted in their social circle, with Charles Dickens referring to their daughters in one of his letters that year. They later quarrelled seriously however and Céleste took on the sole management of the Lyceum and in 1860 that of the Olympic Theatre, where she created one of her most famous roles as Ernest de la Garde in The House on the Bridge of Notre Dame.

Embarking on a long foreign tour between 1863 and 1868, during which she visited both America and Australia, Céleste made the first of her 'farewell performances' as Rudiga in The Woman in Red by Stirling Coyne. She subsequently came out of retirement several times, often to benefit Webster, with whom she was reconciled and who was suffering financial difficulties. Her last stage appearance seems to have been in 1874, again playing her favorite character Miami in The Green Bushes.

Throughout her career Céleste was notable for embodying characters of non-European origin who 'crossed the boundaries of both gender and ethnicity'.

== Death ==
Céleste died of cancer at 18 Rue de Chapeyron, Paris, on 12 February 1882.

== Selected appearances (incomplete) ==
- The Willow Copse (1849 debut at the Adelphi, and subsequently in the United States)
