= Toy theater =

Small stage for imitating or testing full-scale productions

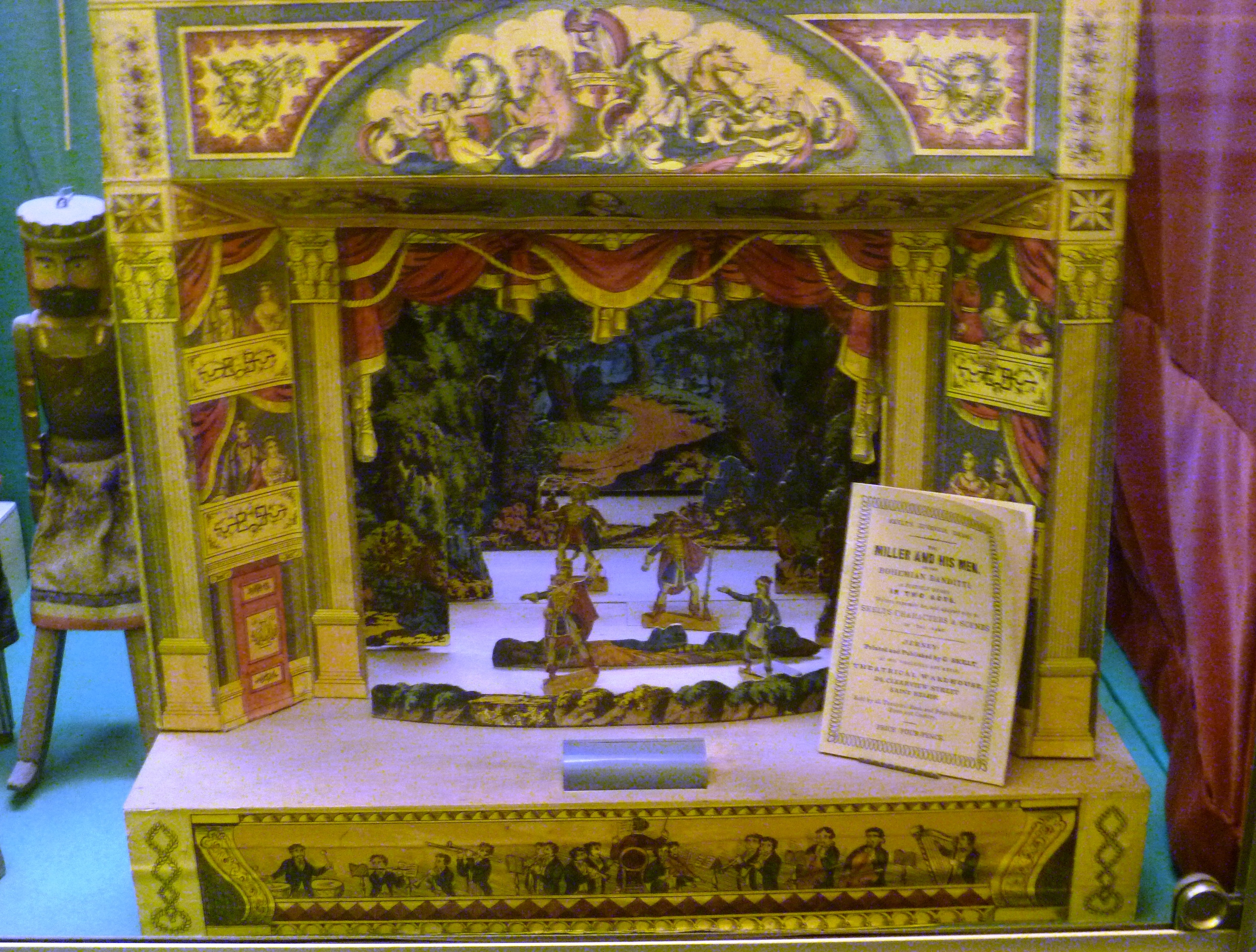
Toy Theater (c.1845–50) by John Redington of London, showing a scene from Isaac Pocock's two-act play "The Miller And His Men". An exhibit in the Edinburgh Museum of Childhood

Toy theater, also called paper theater and model theater (also spelt theatre, see spelling differences), is a form of miniature theater dating back to the early 19th century in Europe. Toy theaters were often printed on paperboard sheets and sold as kits at the concession stand of an opera house, playhouse, or vaudeville theatretheater. Toy theaters were assembled at home and performed for family members and guests, sometimes with live musical accompaniment. Toy theater saw a drastic decline in popularity with a shift towards realism on the European stage in the late 19th century, and again with the arrival of television after World War II. Toy theater has seen a resurgence in recent years among many puppeteers, authors and filmmakers and there are numerous international toy theater festivals throughout the Americas and Europe.

== History ==
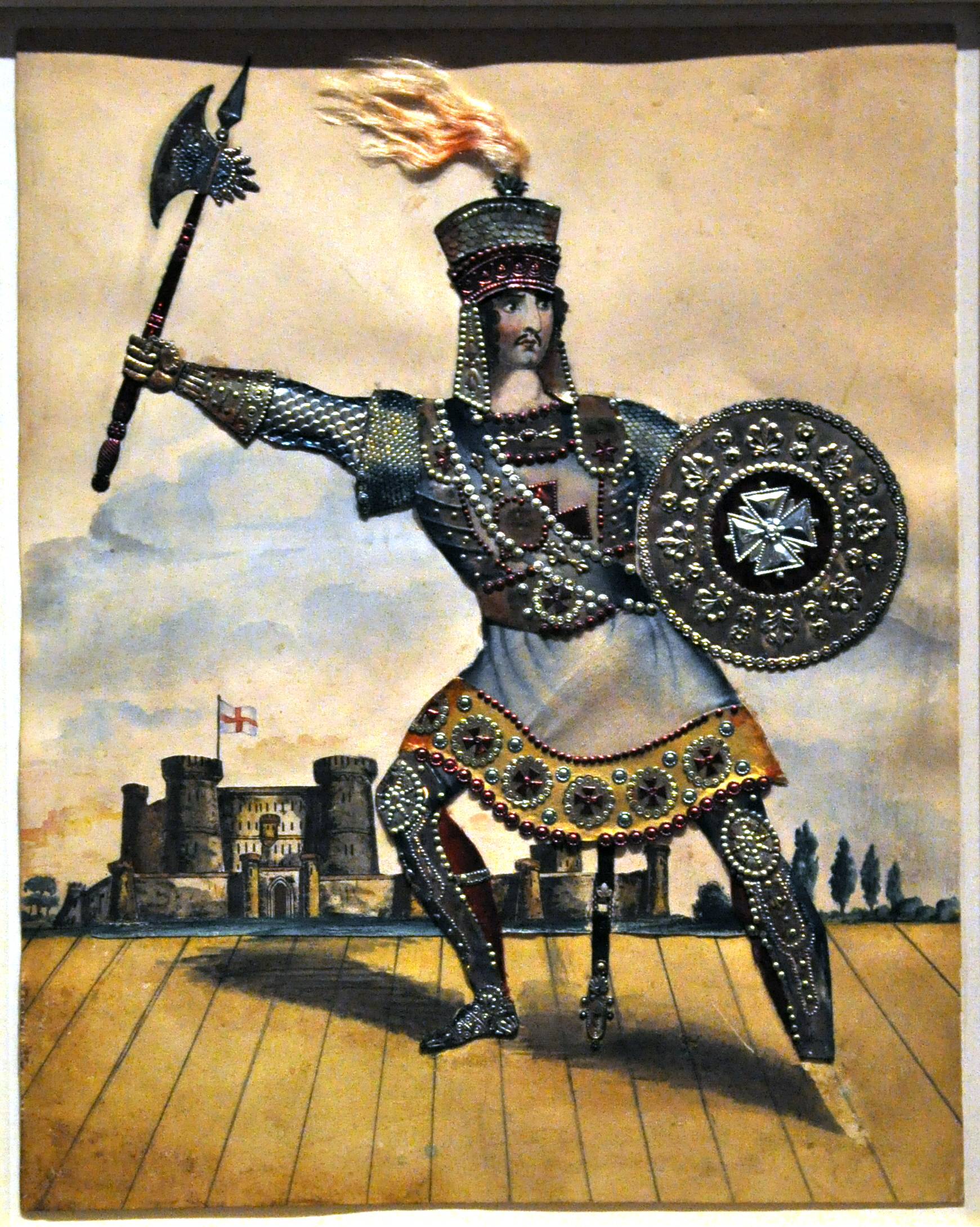
Tinsel print of the English actor John Thomas Haines in character as Brian de Bois-Guilbert in Ivanhoe, about 1830

=== Late 18th and early 19th century ===
The original toy theaters were mass-produced replicas of popular plays, sold as kits that people assembled at home, including stage, scenery, characters and costumes. They were printed on paperboard, available at English playhouses and commercial libraries for "a penny plain or two pence coloured." Hobbyists often went to great pains to not only hand-color their stages but to embellish their toy theater personae with bits of cloth and tinsel; tinsel print characters could be bought pre-tinseled, or a wide range of supplies for home tinseling could be bought. Just as the toy-sized stages diminished a play's scale, their corresponding scripts tended to abridge the text, paring it down to key characters and lines for a shorter, less complicated presentation.

In the first half of the 19th century, more than 300 of London's most popular plays saw the issue as toy theaters. Publishers sent artists to the playhouses of Georgian and early-Victorian London to record the scenery, costumes and dramatic attitudes of the greatest successes of the day. The theater management often provided these artists with a free seat, as the toy theater sheets were excellent free advertising.

=== Late 19th and early 20th century ===
Stage theater of the early 19th century had been based more on spectacle than on depth of plot or character, and these characteristics lent themselves effectively to the format of toy theater. Toward the end of the 19th century, European popular drama had shifted its preference to the trend of realism, marking a dramaturgical swing toward psychological complexity, character motivation and settings using ordinary three-dimensional scenic elements. This trend in stage theater did not make an easy conversion to its toy counterpart, and with the fanciful dramas of fifty years prior being out of fashion, the toy theaters that remained in print fell into obsolescence.

Despite its fall in popularity, toy theater remained in the realm of influential artists who championed its resurgence. In 1884 British author Robert Louis Stevenson wrote an essay in tribute of toy theater's tiny grandeur entitled "Penny Plain, Twopence Coloured" in which he extolled the virtues of the dramas supplied by Pollock's. Other children's authors like Lewis Carroll and Hans Christian Andersen also dabbled in toy theater, as did Oscar Wilde. The brothers Jack and William Butler Yeats both used toy theaters as mock-ups for their work in art and stagecraft. In the 20th century toy theater became a tool for the avant-garde, messed with by futurist founder F.T. Marienetti as well as Pablo Picasso. Film directors like Ingmar Bergman and Orson Welles would use toy theaters as staging grounds for their cinematic masterpieces, and Laurence Olivier even made a toy theater of his film version of Hamlet, mass-produced with a little paper cutout of himself in the starring role. But after its second wave boom, toy theater fell into a second recession, replaced in the 1950s, by a different box in people's sitting rooms that needed no live operator and whose sets, characters, stories and musical numbers were beamed in electronically from miles away to be projected on the glass of a cathode ray tube: television.

=== Late 20th and early 21st century ===
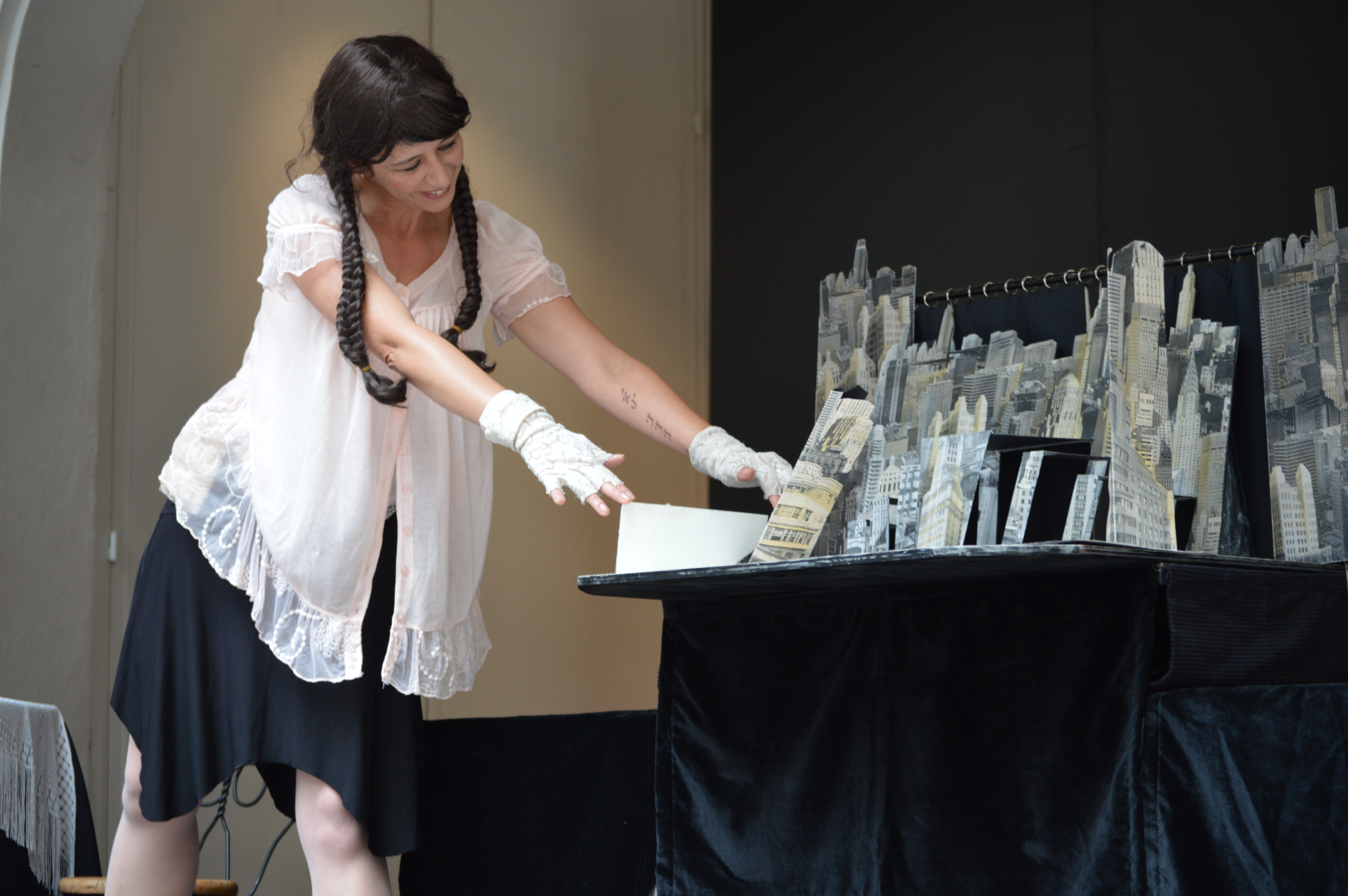
Ainé Adriana Martelli performing Gení y el Zepelin at the Museo de Arte Popular in Mexico City

Toy theater has been enjoying a revival in recent decades. Collectors and traditionalists perform restored versions of Victorian plays while experimental puppeteers push the form's limits, adapting the works of Isaac Babel and Italo Calvino, as well as that of unsung storytellers, friends, neighbors, relatives, and themselves. Contemporary toy theater may use any available technology and cover any subject, and numerous international toy theater festivals occur regularly throughout the Americas and Europe, attracting many well-known actors, musicians and authors to their stages.

== Construction and format ==
Mass-produced toy theaters are usually sold as printed sheets, either in black and white to be colored as desired, or as full-color images of the proscenium, scenery, sets, props and characters. The sheets are pasted onto thin cardboard, cut out, and then assembled for the purposes of the reenacting of a play. Figures are attached to small sticks, wires, or configurations of strings that allow them to move about the set. Some toy theaters and figures are enhanced with moving parts and special effects, and it is common for performances to include live or pre-recorded sound effects and music.

== In modern media ==
- Adam Keen, when proprietor of the Pollock Toy Shop, published a toy theater version of Laurence Olivier's film of Hamlet (1948) with characters and a short playscript.
- A toy theater appears near the end of The Railway Children (1970 film).
- Author/artist Edward Gorey designed a mass-produced toy theater based on his set designs for the 1977 stage production of Dracula.
- A toy theater is featured at the beginning of Ingmar Bergman's award-winning 1982 film Fanny and Alexander.
- Carroll Ballard and Maurice Sendak's 1986 film version of The Nutcracker featured toy theater.
- Set designer Heidi Landesman based her designs for the 1991 musical The Secret Garden on toy theaters.
- Julie Taymor used toy theater puppets in a scene for the 2002 film Frida.
- Sean Meredith's comedic Dante's Inferno (2007) is an entire toy theater film.
- Toy theaters are a motif in a number of Jan Švankmajer's films.
- The music video for Denki Groove's 2008 single "Mononoke Dance" is comprised completely of toy theater.
- A toy theater is featured at the conclusion of Terry Gilliam's 2009 film The Imaginarium of Doctor Parnassus, both as a feature of the plot and the format of the end credits.
- In the 2011 horror-themed video game, Shadows of the Damned, players battle against a demon in a toy theater like screen with characters appearing as toy theater puppets for the level.
- The Japanese films The Burning Buddha Man and Violence Voyager use a technique called 'gekimation' (taken from the Japanese word 'gekiga' which is a term for dramatic manga), a style rooted in the 1976 Cat Eyed Boy adaptation. The puppet "animation" style is akin to toy theater.

== Notable people who have dabbled in toy theater ==
- Hans Christian Andersen, Danish author
- Jane Austen, British novelist
- Edmund Bacon, American city planner
- Peter Baldwin, actor and owner of Benjamin Pollock's Toy Shop
- Ingmar Bergman, Swedish film, stage and opera director
- Jim Copp and Ed Brown, American producers of children's records
- James Burke, British science historian
- Edward Gordon Craig, British designer, theorist, theater practitioner
- Lewis Carroll, British author
- Karl Dane, American silent film actor
- Thomas John Dibdin, British dramatist and songwriter
- Charles Dickens (1812–1870), British novelist
- Ian Falconer, American children's book author/illustrator and theater designer
- Ralph Fiennes, British actor
- Lynn Fontanne, British actor
- W. S. Gilbert, British playwright
- Terry Gilliam, American animator and film director
- Johann Wolfgang von Goethe, German author
- Edward Gorey, American author
- Emma Lomax, English composer and pianist, Early Victorian Theatre, Brighton
- Alfred Lunt, American actor
- Filippo Tommaso Marinetti, Italian poet and founder of the Futurist movement
- Ian McKellen, British actor
- Michel Ocelot, French writer and director of animated films
- Laurence Olivier, British actor
- Pablo Picasso, Spanish painter and sculptor
- J. B. Priestley (1894–1984), English novelist, playwright and broadcaster
- Brian Selznick, American children's book author
- Edwin Smith, British photographer
- Robert Louis Stevenson, British author
- Jan Švankmajer, Czech animator and filmmaker
- Andrew Lloyd Webber, British composer
- Orson Welles, actor and director of radio dramas and films
- Oscar Wilde, British author
- Jack Butler Yeats, Irish artist
- William Butler Yeats, Irish poet, dramatist and literary luminary
- Paul Zaloom, American puppeteer and children's television host

== See also ==
- Puppetry
- Kamishibai
- Little Theatre Movement
- Pollock's Toy Museum
- Benjamin Pollock's Toy Shop
