= Margaret Hebblethwaite =

British writer, journalist, activist and religious worker

Margaret Isabella Mary Hebblethwaite (née Speaight; born 16 June 1951) is a British writer, journalist, activist and religious worker from London.

== Life ==
The daughter of wood engraver Mary Olive (née Mudd) and historian George Speaight, Hebblethwaite is the sister of Antony Speaight, QC. She read theology and philosophy at Lady Margaret Hall, Oxford University, and at the Gregorian University in Rome. In 1974, she met and married Peter Hebblethwaite, a Jesuit who left the priesthood after a decade in the ministry. After laicization, he worked as an editor, journalist and Vaticanologist. The couple married and had three children.

Peter Hebblethwaite died in 1994. Margaret Hebblethwaite worked from 1984 to 1994 in prison chaplaincy, catechesis and parish work in Oxford. From 1991 to 2000 she was assistant editor of The Tablet. Since 2000 she has been a freelance missionary and educationalist in Santa María, Paraguay, pioneering and supporting community work in education. She speaks regularly at the Greenbelt Festivals.

She met Pope Francis in Buenos Aires and had regular dealings with him, having conversed with him in pews after Sunday mass. She has described him as "not only passionately committed to the gospel of poverty, but also highly intelligent and cultured." In 2005, when he was in Rome for that year's conclave, she "dropped off a letter for him." He also provided her with some contacts, including "a well-informed Argentinian journalist in Rome, and his then press secretary, Guillermo Marcó."

== Works ==
Hebblethwaite has written several books, including: Motherhood and God, Finding God in All Things, Base Communities: An Introduction, Paraguay: Bradt Travel Guides and Conversations on Christian Feminism, co-written with academic Elaine Storkey.
