= John Thomas Haines =

British actor and dramatist

John Thomas Haines (c.1799–1843) was a British actor and dramatist

== Life ==
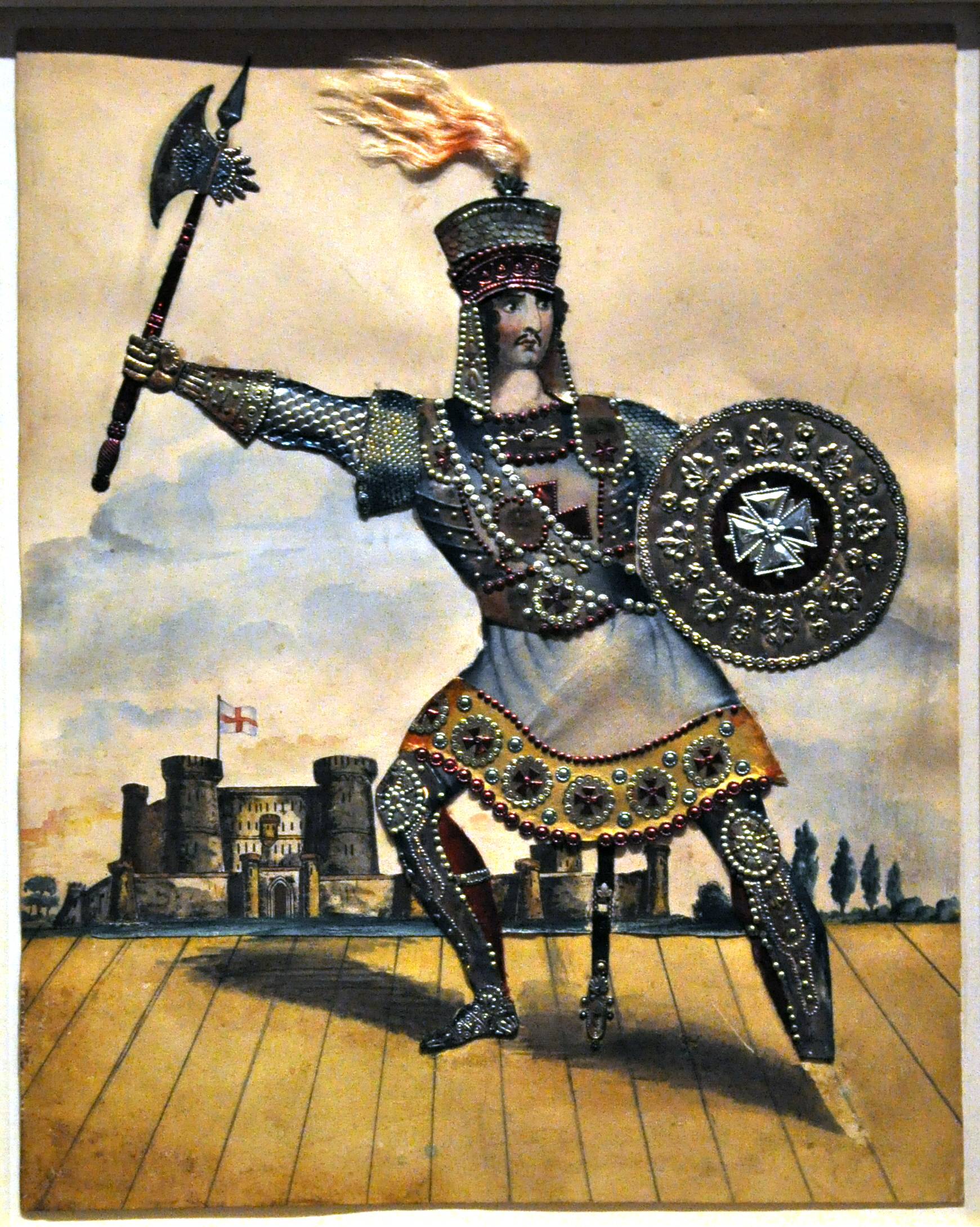
John Thomas Haines in character as Brian de Bois-Guilbert in Ivanhoe, tinsel print, about 1830

Born about 1799, from 1823 for two decades he supplied the smaller London theatres with melodramas of the "blood-and-thunder" type, with general success. His sea-plays were vehicles for T. P. Cooke, and My Poll and my Partner Joe, a nautical drama in three acts, produced at the Surrey Theatre on 7 September 1835, was notably profitable.

Haines occasionally acted in his own pieces. He died at Stockwell on 18 May 1843, aged 44, at the time stage-manager of the English Opera House.

== Works ==
Among Haines's plays were:

- The Idiot Witness; or a Tale of Blood, melodrama in two acts (Coburg Theatre, 1823).
- Jacob Faithful; or the Life of a Thames Waterman, domestic local drama in three acts (Surrey Theatre, 14 December 1834).
- Richard Plantagenet, historical drama in three acts (Victoria Theatre, 1836).
- The Ocean of Life; or Every Inch a Sailor, nautical drama in three acts (Surrey Theatre, 4 April 1836).
- Maidens Beware!, burletta in one act (Victoria Theatre, January 1837).
- Breakers Ahead! or a Seaman's Log, nautical drama in three acts (Victoria Theatre, 10 April 1837).
- Angeline Le Lis, original drama in one act (St. James's Theatre, 29 September 1837).
- The Charming Polly; or Lucky or Unlucky Days, drama in two acts (Surrey Theatre, 29 June 1838).
- Alice Grey, the Suspected One; or the Moral Brand, domestic drama in three acts (Surrey Theatre, 1 April 1839).
- Nick of the Woods; or the Altar of Revenge, a melodrama (Victoria Theatre, 1839).
- The Wizard of the Wave; or the Ship of the Avenger, a legendary nautical drama in three acts (Victoria Theatre, 2 September 1840).
- The Yew Tree Ruins; or the Wreck, the Miser, and the Mines, domestic drama in three acts (11 Jan. 1841).
- Ruth; or the Lass that Loves a Sailor, a nautical and domestic drama in three acts (Victoria Theatre, 23 January 1843).
- Austerlitz; or the Soldier's Bride, melodrama in three acts (Queen's Theatre).
- Amilie, or the Love Test, opera in three acts.
- The Wraith of the Lake; or the Brownie's Brig, melodrama in three acts.
- Rattlin the Reefer; or the Tiger of the Sea, nautical drama in three acts.
- The Wizard Skiff, nautical drama

Haines also adapted and arranged from the French of Eugène Scribe and Jules-Henri Vernoy de Saint-Georges the songs, duets, quartettes, recitatives, and choruses in the opera of Queen for a Day. Set to music by Adolphe Adam, it was first performed at the Surrey Theatre on 14 June 1841.

== Notes ==
Attribution

This article incorporates text from a publication now in the public domain: Stephen, Leslie; Lee, Sidney, eds. (1890). "Haines, John Thomas". Dictionary of National Biography. Vol. 24. London: Smith, Elder & Co.
