= Pollock's Toy Museum =

Museum in London, England

Coordinates: 51°31′13″N 0°8′7″W

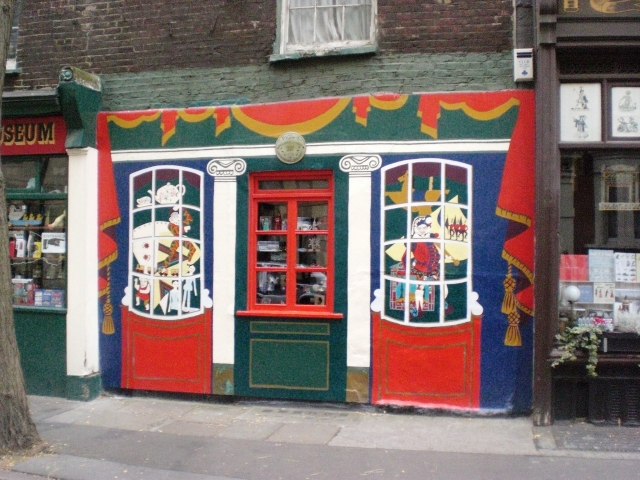
Pollock's Toy Museum earlier premises on Scala Street

Pollock's Toy Museum is a small museum which is based across two sites in London, England: the Whitgift Centre in Croydon and at Leadenhall Market.

== History ==
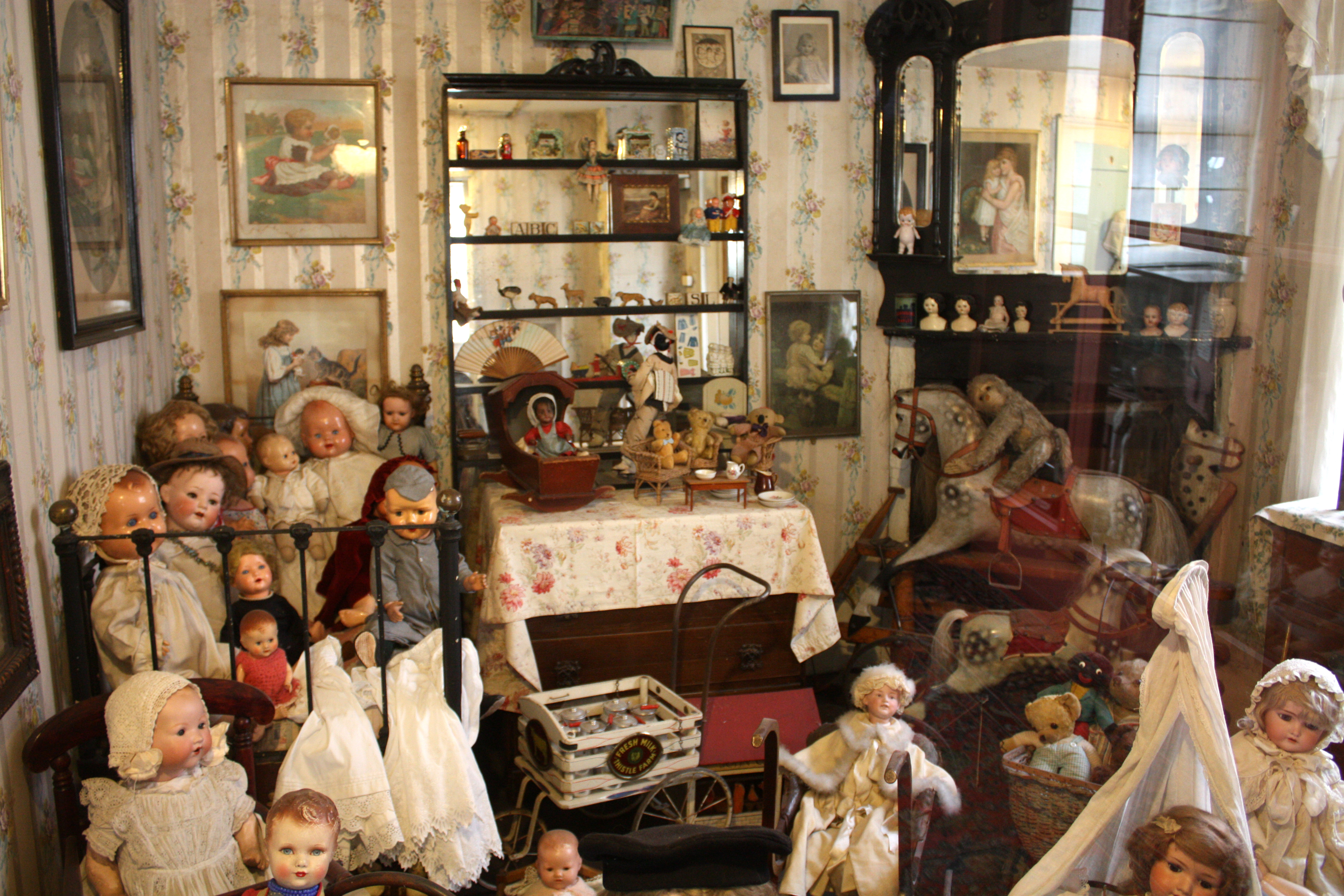
A display of dolls

The museum is named for Benjamin Pollock, a publisher of Victorian toy theatres. After Pollock's death in 1937, Alan Keen purchased his remaining stock to continue the business, relaunching in 1946. However, Keen went bankrupt by 1951. Marguerite Fawdry wished to purchase some pieces for her son's toy theatre, and finding Keen's business closed, purchased his entire stock, which led to her using this as the foundation for Pollock's Toy Museum.

The museum was started in 1956 in a single attic room at 44 Monmouth Street, near Covent Garden. As the enterprise flourished, other rooms were taken over for the museum and the ground floor became a toyshop. By 1969 the collection had outgrown the Monmouth Street premises and Pollock's Toy Museum moved to 1 Scala Street, with a museum shop on the ground floor to contribute to its support. The museum had vintage teddies, dolls' houses, rocking horses, miniature theatres, electric train sets and antique models on display. The museum continues today to be run by the grandson of the founder Marguerite Fawdry.

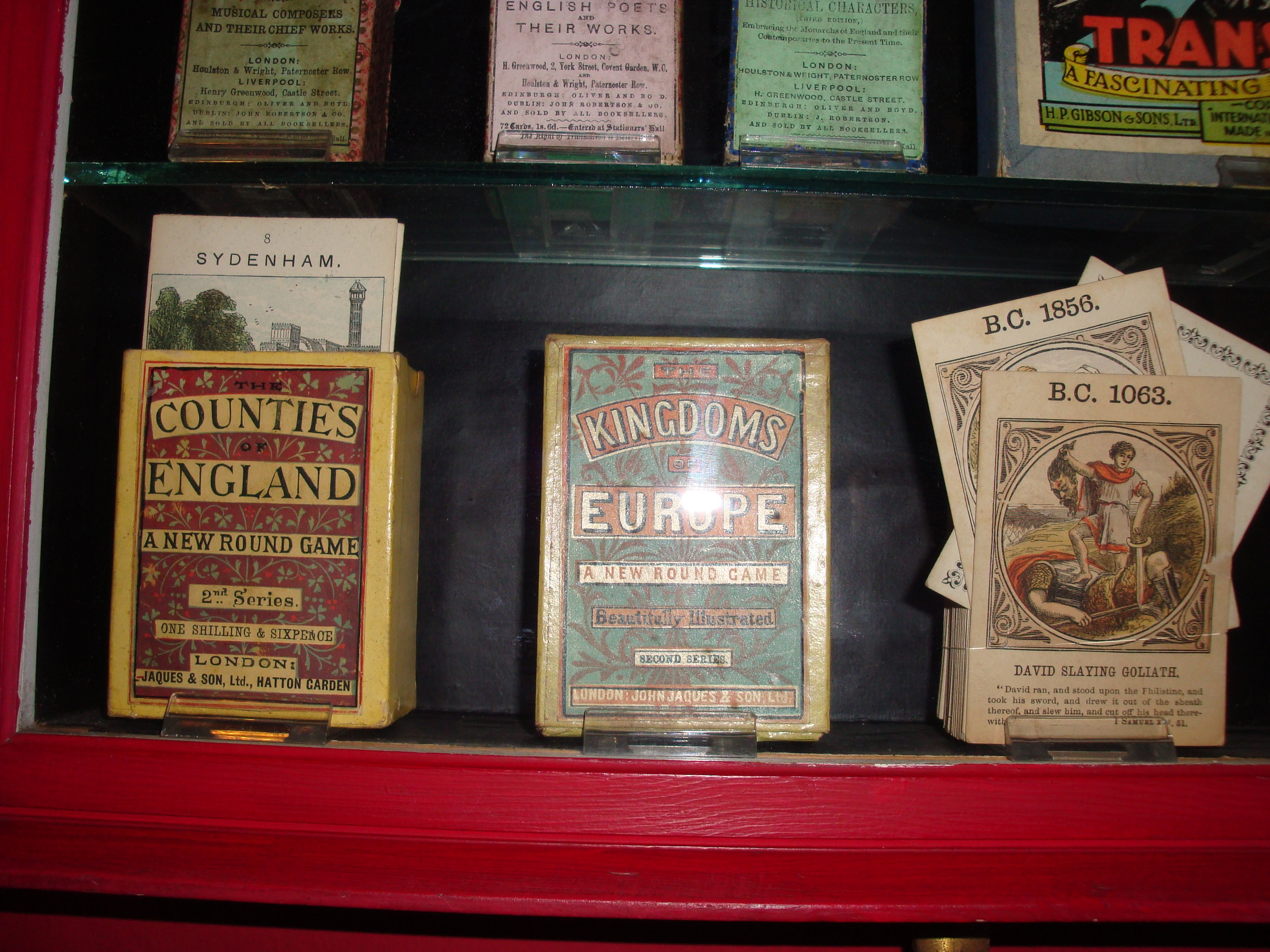
Collection of playing cards, Pollock's Toy Museum London

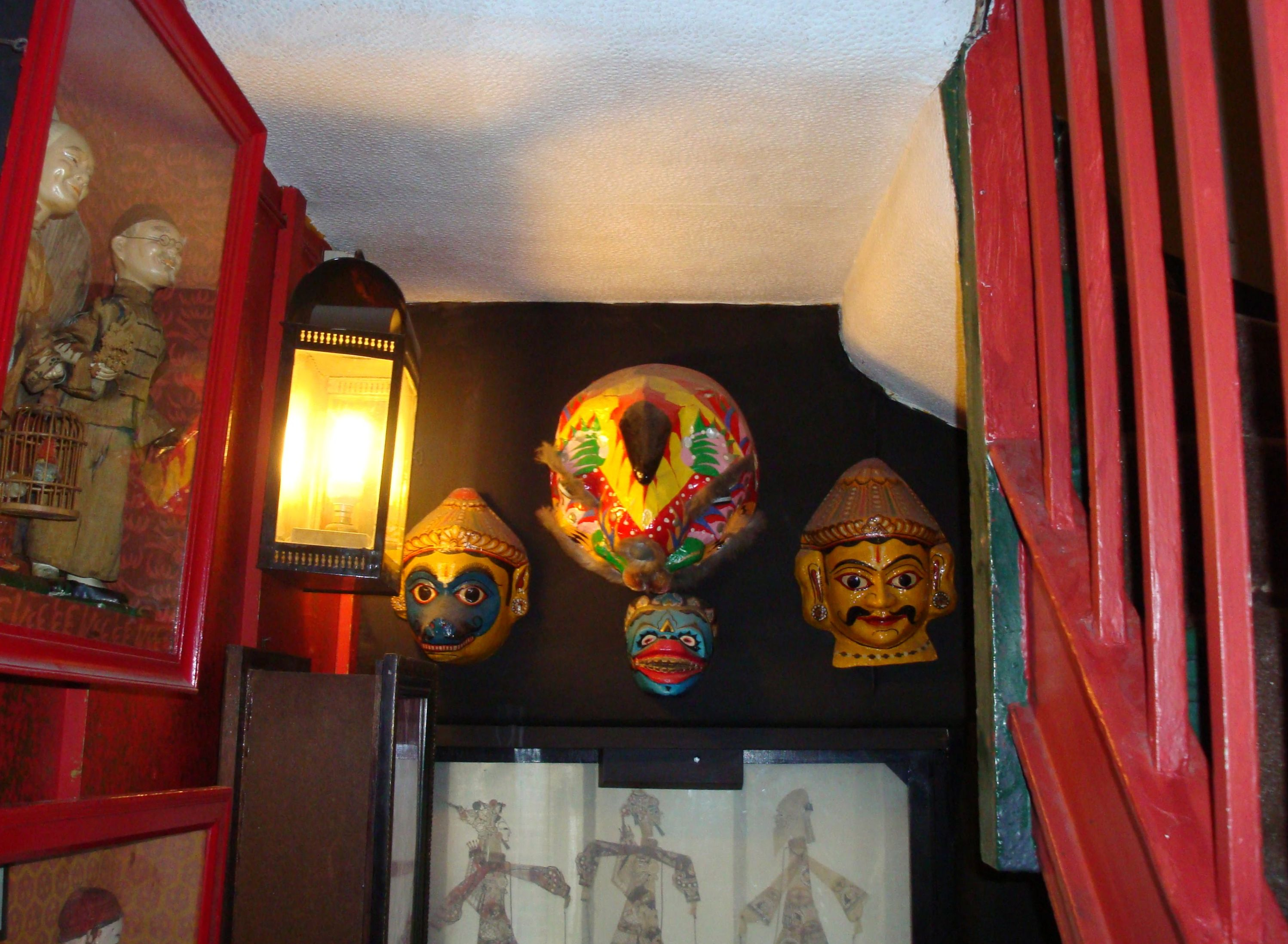
Masks, Pollock's Toy Museum London, July 2009

The museum announced on 18 January 2023 that it had not secured a new lease on its building and was looking for a new venue. The venue was closed, and staff and volunteers moved the stock into storage. The museum's collection is now divided between two pop-up locations: in the Whitgift Centre in Croydon and at Leadenhall Market. This is a temporary solution while a new permanent home is sought.

== See also ==
- Benjamin Pollock's Toy Shop
