= Thomas Barry (clown) =

Irish circus clown

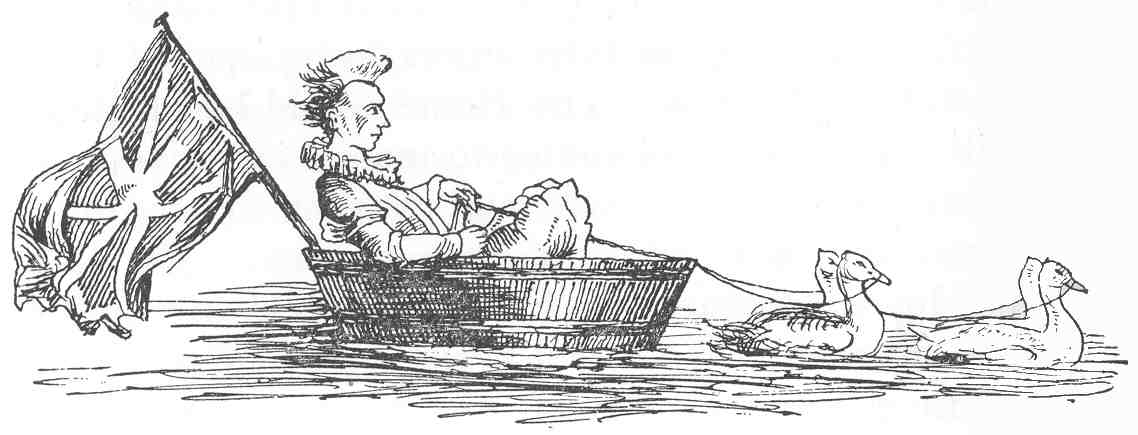
- Depiction of Barry's 1844 stunt
- Born: c. 1810; Ireland
- Died: 23 March 1857 (aged 46–47)
- Resting place: West Norwood Cemetery
- Occupation: Circus clown

Thomas Barry (c. 1810 – 23 March 1857) was an Irish circus clown. He worked with various circuses but was associated most with Astley's Circus. Barry was a traditional "buffoon" whiteface clown whose performances were based on physical humour. In 1844 he featured in a famous stunt whereby he appeared to be towed along the River Thames in a tub pulled by four geese. Barry left Astley's Circus in 1848 after falling-out with another clown, though he later returned, he retired permanently in 1856 after another disagreement. Whilst out of the circus Barry was landlord of the Crown Tavern in Lambeth.

== Early life and career ==
Thomas Barry was born in Ireland in around 1810. He was married to Elizabeth Campbell (died 1873), an actress who performed at Sadler's Wells Theatre and in Marylebone. Barry's son, also called Thomas Barry, was born in Manchester in 1839 – he would later also perform as a circus clown. Barry joined Sam Wild's Circus in 1837 and performed in Swansea, Wales with Samwell's Circus and Cornwall's Royal Circus. The townspeople rewarded his performance by commissioning an oil portrait of Barry that was presented to him "as a mark of their esteem of his public & private worth".

From 1843 Barry worked at Astley's Circus as a whiteface circus clown, the start of a long association with that circus that would last until his death. Barry's style of clowning has been described as traditional, playing the buffoon character and relying on physical humour. However, he also performed with horses as an equestrian clown. His most famous sketch was an impression of a parliamentary candidate speaking at a hustings. Barry's whiteface makeup included a small red outline to the mouth, red triangles on his cheeks, black eyebrows and a bald cap.

Barry's character was described by an employer as jovial and good-natured. The young W. S. Gilbert was a fan of Barry's as a child and once, starstruck upon recognising him, followed him down a street. In 1844 Barry took part in a stunt where he sailed down the Thames between Vauxhall and Westminster in a tub pulled by four geese. The trick, first devised by Dicky Usher in 1809, was achieved by having the tub pulled by a rowboat attached by an underwater line. The stunt was popular at the time; in 1845 a similar trick performed by another clown, Arthur Nelson, caused the deaths of 79 people when a large crowd caused the collapse of Yarmouth suspension bridge.

== Leaving Astley's ==
Barry reached the height of his fame in 1847 by which point he had become a long-term fixture at Astley's Circus. However, the next year he fell out with W. F. Wallett, a clown at the circus. Wallett was pioneering the more sophisticated Shakespearian clown role in his performances. Barry demanded the right to choose which parts Wallett would be allocated to play in the show but this was denied and he left Astley's Circus. He was replaced as principal clown by Wallett, who described the situation as arising from Barry's jealousy.

Leaving the circus behind Barry took on the running of the Crown Tavern in Lambeth, where he was landlord until 1850. In 1849 he found work for a 9-week season at Hengler's Circus in Windsor and by the early 1850s he had returned to Astley's Circus on a wage of £10 per week. He appeared before a court at Lambeth in 1850 charged with assaulting William Henry Harvey, the ballet master at Astley's. In 1853 Barry worked at Madame Macarte's Monster American Circus in Wolverhampton and E. T. Smith's Circus in Drury Lane, London. From 1853–54 he was with Hernandez and Stone's Circus, though he continued to perform at Astley's Circus throughout this time.

Barry left Astley's Circus for the final time in 1856 when he was denied the first choice of parts in the show. He returned to managing the Crown Tavern, where he was landlord until his death. In 1857 he was known to be unwell and William Cooke, the manager of Astley's Circus, hosted a benefit show for Barry, providing free use of a venue. Barry died on 26 March 1857 and is buried in West Norwood Cemetery.
