= James M. Nixon =

American circus proprietor (1820–1899)

- Born: James Munro Nixon; 1820; United States
- Died: September 16, 1899; New York City, United States
- Occupation: Impresario

James Munro Nixon (1820 – April 23, 1899) was an American circus proprietor and impresario.

== Early life ==
James Munro Nixon was born in the United States during the 19th century. Around 1836, young Nixon started as a stable groom in a circus, eventually performing with multiple troupes in the 1840s and 1850s as an acrobat, ringmaster, and equestrian director.

== Circus life ==
In 1856, he entered management and in 1857, James M. Nixon, partnered with William H. Kemp on a circus venture called the Great Eastern Circus which had to be drawn by 40 horses. This combined Nixon's Great American Circus and Kemp's Mammoth English Circus.

By October 1859, Nixon's Great Circus set up its tent at Broadway and 13th Street, with a company including Melville, Nichols, Ross, Castello, and Madame Mason. During this year, Nixon travelled to Europe to engage artists for an engagement in New York City, and managed to secure the Hanlon-Lees and William Cooke, the equestrian director of London's Astley's Royal Amphitheatre.

On January 16, 1860, Niblo's Garden in New York City was opened for its first show under Nixon's management. Nixon brought Cooke's Royal Circus from Astley's Amphitheatre to Niblo's Garden, later merging it with P.T. Barnum's Old Grizzly Adams' California Menagerie for a New England tour. From March 5 to April 6, 1860, the company travelled to Boston with the equestrian troupe of William Cooke as well as Ella Zoyara among the attractions. Opening under the name Cooke's Royal Amphitheatre, the circus was rebranded by the end of the five-week run to Nixon's Troupe of Equestrians from Astley's Royal Amphitheatre. Displeased with Nixon's management, William Cooke chose to return home, leading to his name being dropped as Nixon's troupe made its way back to New York on April 9, 1860. Later that year, Nixon's Royal Circus travelled through Virginia and North Carolina. In March 1861, Nixon's Royal Circus returned from its tour of the Southern States and Cuba. In May 1861, Spanish dancer Isabella Cubas came under the management of James M. Nixon.

Nixon opened the Cremorne Gardens in 1862 on Fourteenth Street and Sixth Avenue in New York City. By 1863, he hit the road with James M. Nixon's Railroad Circus.

At the end of 1865, Nixon formed a partnership with the Wisconsin circus clown Dan Castello. In 1869, Nixon and Castello arrived by train in Omaha, Nebraska. While touring the Midwestern United States, James M. Nixon conceived the idea of using the newly established Transcontinental Railroad to bring Dan Castello's Circus and Menagerie to the Pacific coast.

In the spring of 1876, Nixon was in Europe, and by 1879, he was reported to be managing a theater in Chicago. He later appeared at W.C. Coup's Circus on June 22, 1882.

== Death ==
James M. Nixon died from bright's disease on September 16, 1899 in New York City, United States.
