= James Thorpe Cooke =

British circus proprietor (1810-1869)

- Born: James Thorpe Cooke; 1810; England
- Died: 5 September 1869 (aged 58–59); Portobello, Edinburgh, Scotland
- Resting place: Dean Cemetery
- Occupations: Showman; Circus proprietor
- Father: Thomas Taplin Cooke
- Relatives: William Cooke (brother); Alfred Cooke (brother); Thomas Cooke (grandfather)

James Thorpe Cooke (1810 – 5 September 1869) was an English showman and circus proprietor.

== Early life ==
James Thorpe Cooke was born in England in 1810. Born into a celebrated English equestrian family, James was the third son of Thomas Taplin Cooke and part of Cooke's Royal Circus. He had two brothers: William (1808-1886) and Alfred (1821-1854).

== Circus life ==
James Thorpe Cooke established himself as a top horse rider within his father's company of equestrians. He was among the performers when the company staged shows on Blake Street in York from October to December 1832.

During the early 1830s, he performed with his father's company as permanent venues were established in Newcastle upon Tyne, Sunderland, and Hull. His first known appearance in Hull took place on May 20, 1833. Cooke performed in Hull on June 14, 1833, as "A Chinese Enchanter, Flying From The Fiends of Vengeance, On Three Desert Steeds." He followed with an equestrian performance titled The Reaper, or Love & Labour.

At Cooke's permanent venue on Great Windmill Street, Haymarket, James Cooke performed a daring equestrian act in October 1834. His act included leaping from horseback over two 7-foot canvases, through four balloons, across an 8-foot lighted platform, and through a mail coach.

He toured Ireland with Cooke's Royal Circus in December 1834, performing in Dublin through early 1835 and appearing in Belfast for the first time on April 20.

His father, Thomas T. Cooke, established the first circus in Edinburgh in 1835. James often toured Scotland, where he had full command of the equestrian business and was particularly popular in Edinburgh. On May 12, 1836, he made an appearance in Perth, Scotland, under the banner of Cooke's New Royal Circus.

Shortly after 1836, James Cooke became proprietor of his own circus. He led the traveling circus from around 1837 to 1849.

On May 16, 1840, in Edinburgh, James Cooke performed 'on a splendid charger' as Corporal John Shaw, the Life Guardsman from the Battle of Waterloo, and appeared as Ramo Taj Mahal, an Indian magician, executing feats on three horses.

He also performed in hippodramas, taking on various Shakespearean characters including Falstaff, Shylock, and Richard III.

From January 1847 to November 1848, he made appearances in Edinburgh, Leith, Arbroath, Stirling, Falkirk, Greenock, Glasgow, and Dundee. He briefly retired from the profession in 1849 and, in April, auctioned his trained horses, ponies, carriages, wardrobe, and other circus property. Retiring with a modest fortune, he purchased a rural property near Dalkeith. Though he lived there for a year, his active disposition and deep affection for circus life led him to collect and train a new stable of horses. In 1850, he resumed work as a circus manager and continued a successful career for the next six years.

James Cooke's Circus began playing in Sunderland in 1851. Afterward, he completed a successful season in Newcastle upon Tyne. His tenting season began in May 1852. He toured from Aberdeen in December 1852 to Dundee in February 1853, arriving in Glasgow that May. Around this time, his brother William began leasing Astley's Amphitheatre in London.

James retired from professional equestrianism in 1856. Following his retirement, he settled in Portobello, Edinburgh.

== Personal life ==
On February 8, 1836, James Cooke married Marian Clerk, daughter of George Clerk of Edinburgh. He had a daughter named Eliza Ann Cooke who also engaged in circus performances.

== Death ==
James Thorpe Cooke died at 59 years old on 5 September 1869 in Portobello, Edinburgh. He succumbed to apoplexy.

== Legacy ==
The young James Cooke, by Andrew Ducrow's own admission, exceeded him in various equestrian performances and was seen as his only legitimate rival in the art.
