= John Henry Cooke =

British circus proprietor (1837–1917)

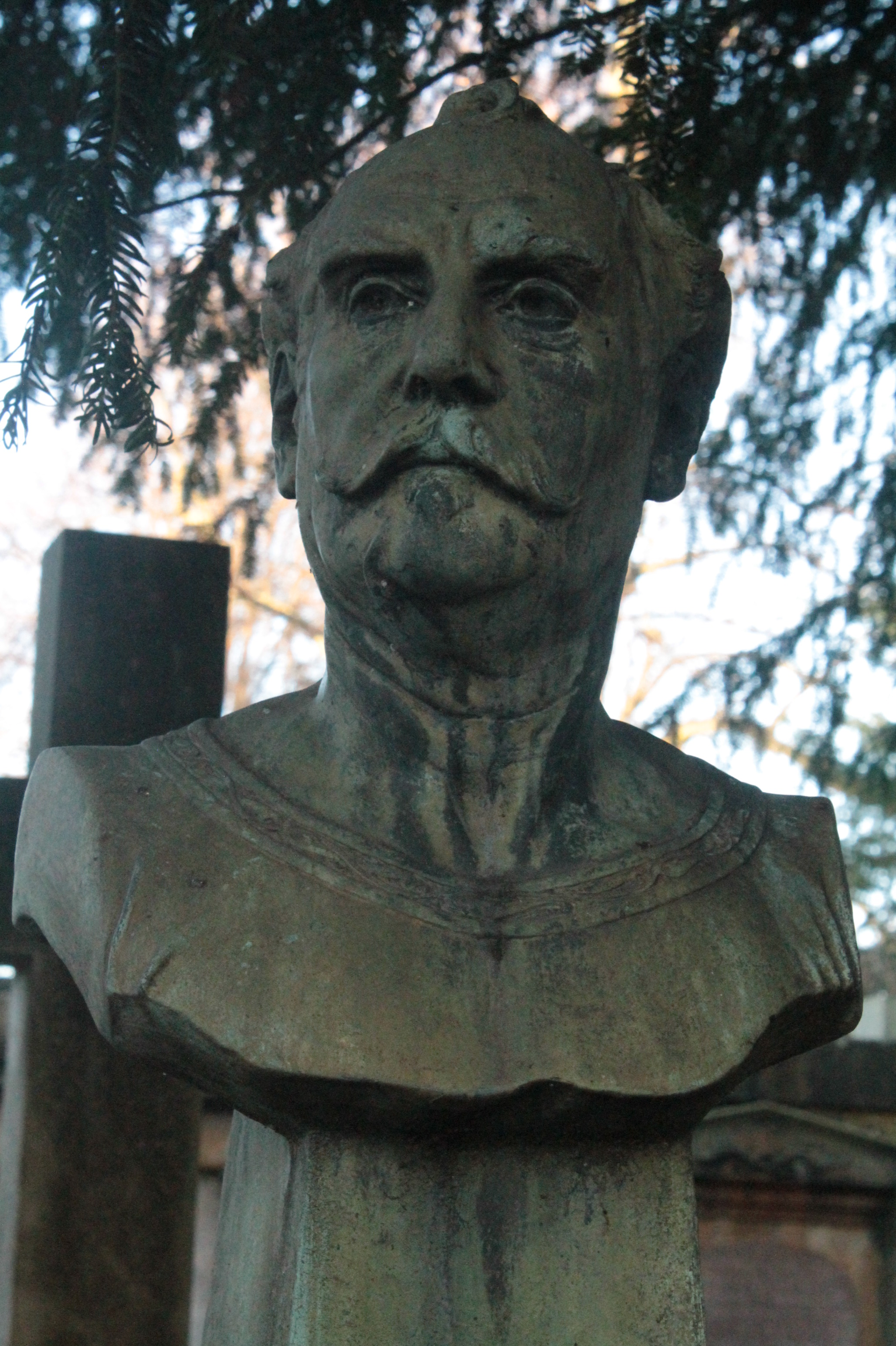
- Bust of John Henry Cooke on the Cooke monument at Dean Cemetery
- Born: John Henry Cooke; 1837; New York, U.S.
- Died: 22 August 1917 (aged 79–80); Edinburgh, Scotland
- Resting place: Dean Cemetery
- Occupations: Showman; Circus proprietor
- Father: Henry Cooke
- Relatives: Thomas Taplin Cooke (uncle); William Cooke (cousin); Thomas Cooke (grandfather)

John Henry Cooke (1837 – 22 August 1917) was an English showman and circus proprietor.

== Early life ==
John Henry Cooke was born in 1837 in New York, United States. He was the son of Henry Cooke and nephew of Thomas Taplin Cooke, proprietor of Cooke's Royal Circus. His father was an acrobat and tightrope walker.

His birth coincided with the family circus's first season in America, which included stops in New York City, Boston, Philadelphia, and Baltimore before returning to England.

== Circus life ==
By the age of five, he was performing as a tightrope walker and equestrian, having been raised in the profession and making early appearances at Astley's Amphitheatre with his uncle's company. He was called the "Bounding Jockey" in his early years.

His uncle, Thomas Taplin Cooke, established Edinburgh's first circus in 1835. In Edinburgh, the Cookes began on the site of the Caledonian Edinburgh Hotel on Princes Street. By the 1840s, the equestrian establishment moved to Nicolson Street, where the Edinburgh Festival Theatre now stands. After T. T. Cooke died in 1866, Cooke's circus came under the direction of John Henry Cooke. In 1877, it relocated to Grindlay Street, now the site of the Royal Lyceum Theatre.

He and his brothers, Alfred Eugene and Henry Welby, managed a circus on Warwick Road's Congress Hall ground in Carlisle during the early 1880s. The circus was first known as "Cooke Brothers." The partnership endured after Henry Welby's 1882 death, dissolving on November 15, 1884. The circus proprietor had an extensive circuit before settling in Edinburgh and Greenock. He had toured nearly all of Scotland, drawing the support of many among the Scottish nobility and aristocracy.

He purchased a site in Aberdeen and commissioned John Rust Jr. to design a stone-and-lime circus building. Cooke's Royal Circuses were active in Edinburgh, Greenock, and Aberdeen, by August 1886.

In November 1886, John Henry Cooke established a permanent venue for the traveling circus by building Palladium Theatre, in East Fountainbridge on Lothian Road. His new venue, seating 2,250 and costing over £5,000, opened on November 8, 1886, with Sir Thomas Clark, 1st Baronet in attendance. He and his son opened the show with a double juggling act on horseback. Cooke also appeared in character as Rob Roy MacGregor. The establishment drew over 30,000 visitors within its first two weeks. His popularity in Fountainbridge attracted patronage from the High Constables of Edinburgh and the High Constables and Guard of Honour of the Palace of Holyroodhouse in 1888.

John Henry Cooke's Circus was located at Greenock's Campbell Street Fairground in 1891. His seasons were divided between Edinburgh and Greenock. At Campbell Street in Greenock, he led a riding school with many pupils. When the circus fell on hard times, he gave it up and later built a wooden circus on the site of Greenock's Kings Theatre.

Even after turning 70, he remained actively involved in managing the circus establishment. He ran the circus at Fountainbridge until 1908, when it closed after forty-two years, concluding the family's circus legacy.

== Personal life ==
John Henry Cooke's siblings included Alfred Eugene, Harry Welby, and George Ernest Cooke.

Henrietta, his wife, was born a Cooke. They had three sons and two daughters. Each member of John Henry's family was named after where they were born. His sons were Leicester Alfred, born in Leicester; Leon Douglas, born in Isle of Man; and Talberto Cooke. His son, Leicester Alfred Cooke, was a gifted horse rider and animal trainer. His daughters were Ernestine Rosa, born in Rothesay, and Edina Marion, born in Edinburgh.

John frequently attended services of J. P. Struthers at the Reformed Presbyterian Church of Scotland in Greenock.

== Death ==
John Henry Cooke died at age 80 in Edinburgh, Scotland, on 22 August 1917. He was buried in Edinburgh at Dean Cemetery.

== Legacy ==
J. H. Cooke toured internationally, with appearances in the United States, Canada, France, Germany, Italy, and Spain. Throughout his career, he performed for the Emperor Napoleon III, the Empress Eugenie, and the Prince Imperial in Paris; King Edward VII and Queen Alexandra, when Prince and Princess of Wales; and at Buckingham Palace, he gave an exhibition of his skill before Queen Victoria and Prince Albert.

Queen Victoria entrusted him with training her horses on several occasions.

== Gallery ==
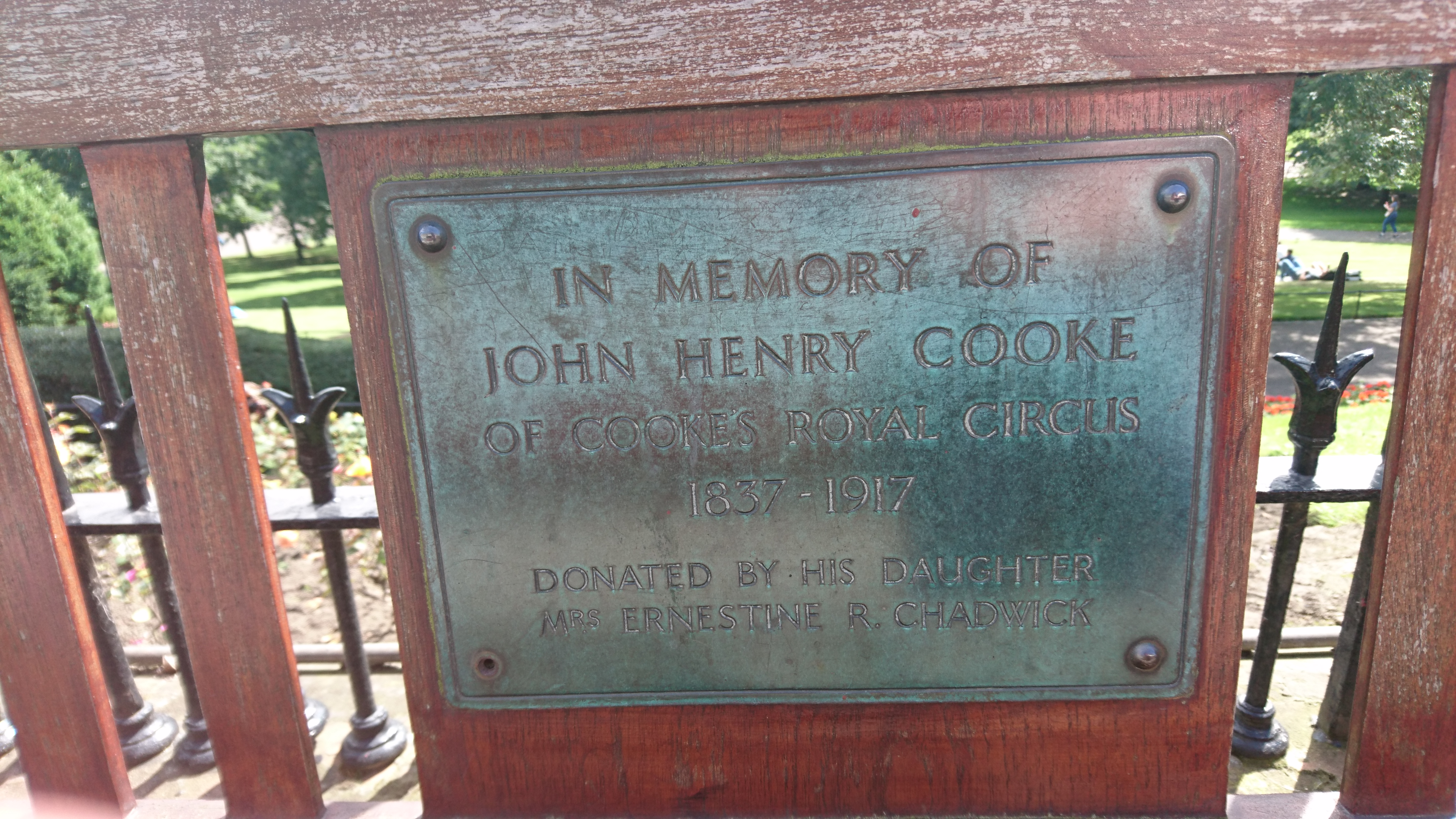
