= Ducrow =

Ducrow is a surname. Notable people with the surname include:

- Andrew Ducrow (1793–1842), British circus performer
- Ulrich Duchrow (born 1935), professor of systematic theology
