= Cooke's Royal Circus =

British circus (1780–1912)

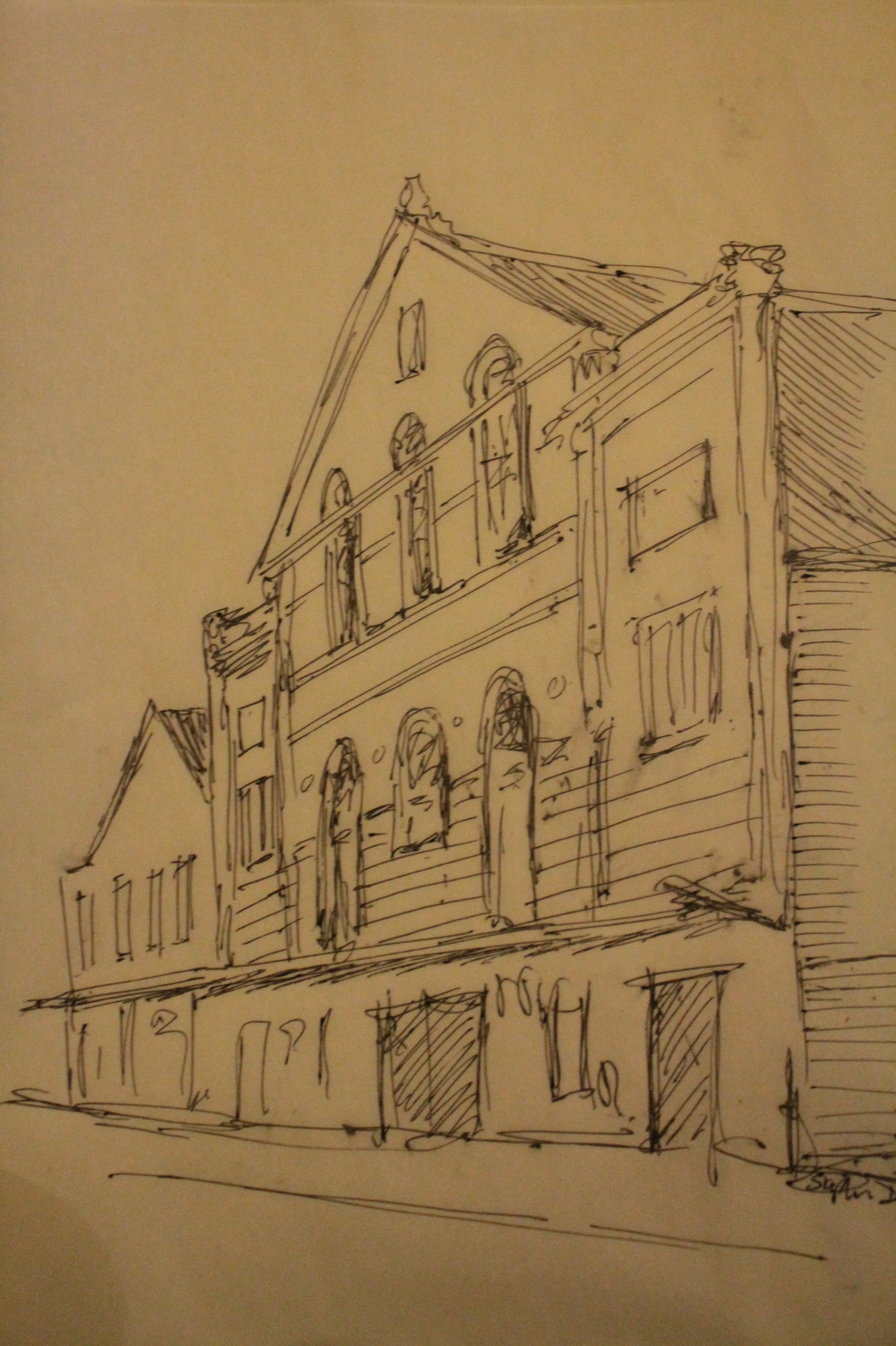
- Cooke's Royal Circus on East Fountainbridge

Origin
- Country: United Kingdom (England)
- Founder(s): Thomas Taplin Cooke
- Year founded: 1780
- Defunct: 1912

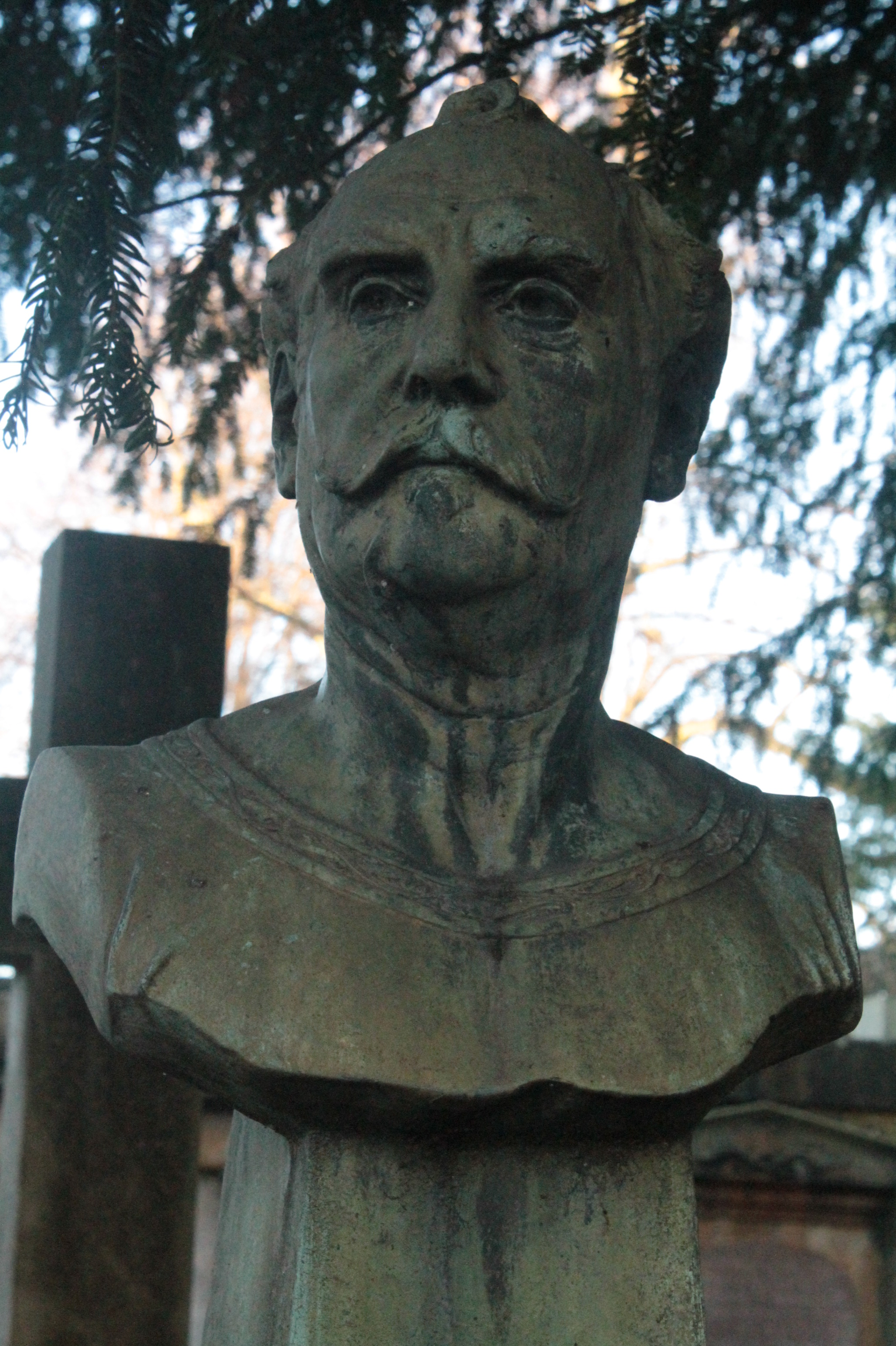
Bust of John Henry Cooke on the Cooke monument, Dean Cemetery

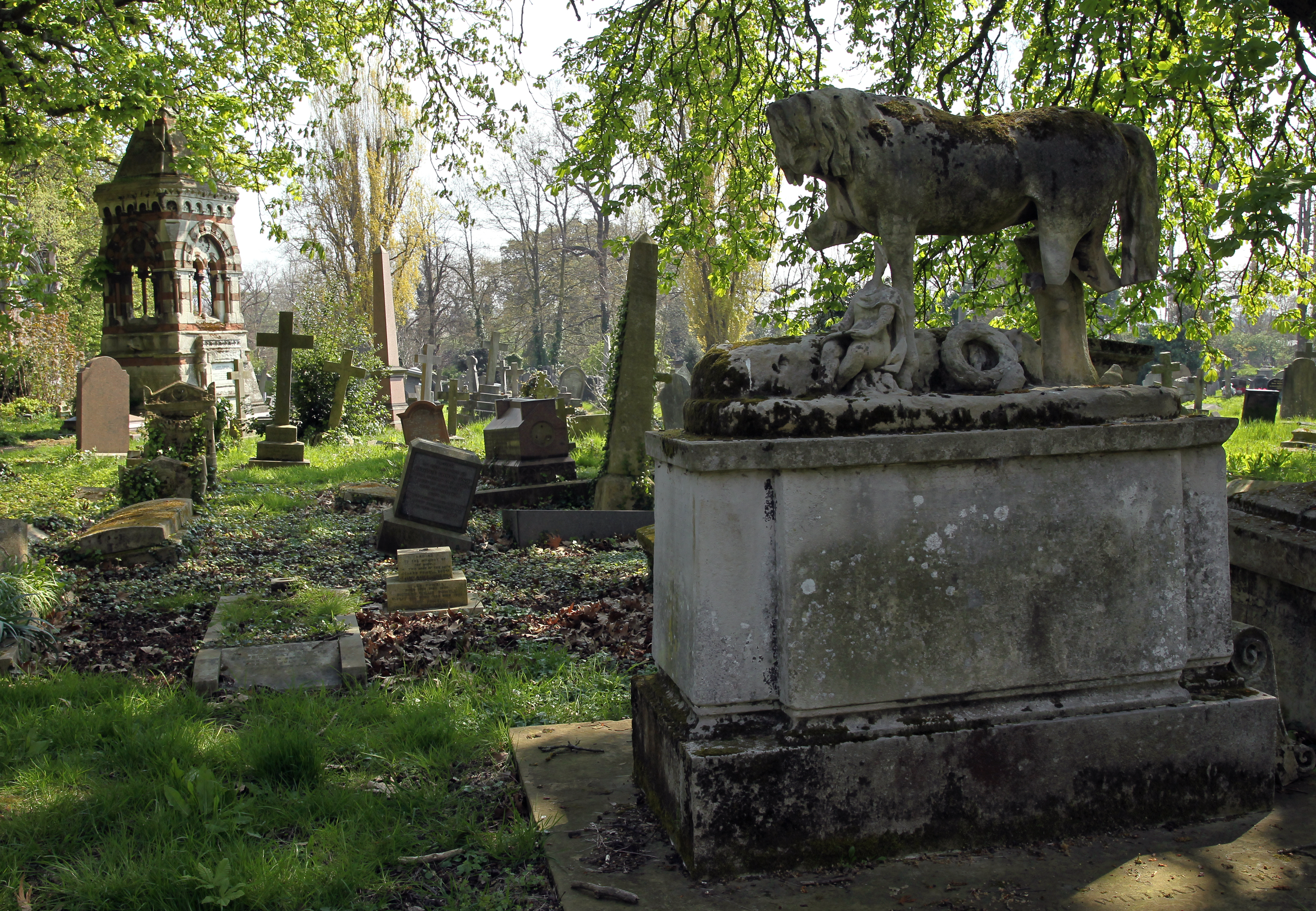
The grave of Thomas Taplin Cooke (right) Kensal Green Cemetery

Cooke's Royal Circus (1780–1912) started as a circus show travelling around Britain in the late 18th century. It was primarily an equestrian show with over half the acts involving horses.

== Thomas Cooke ==
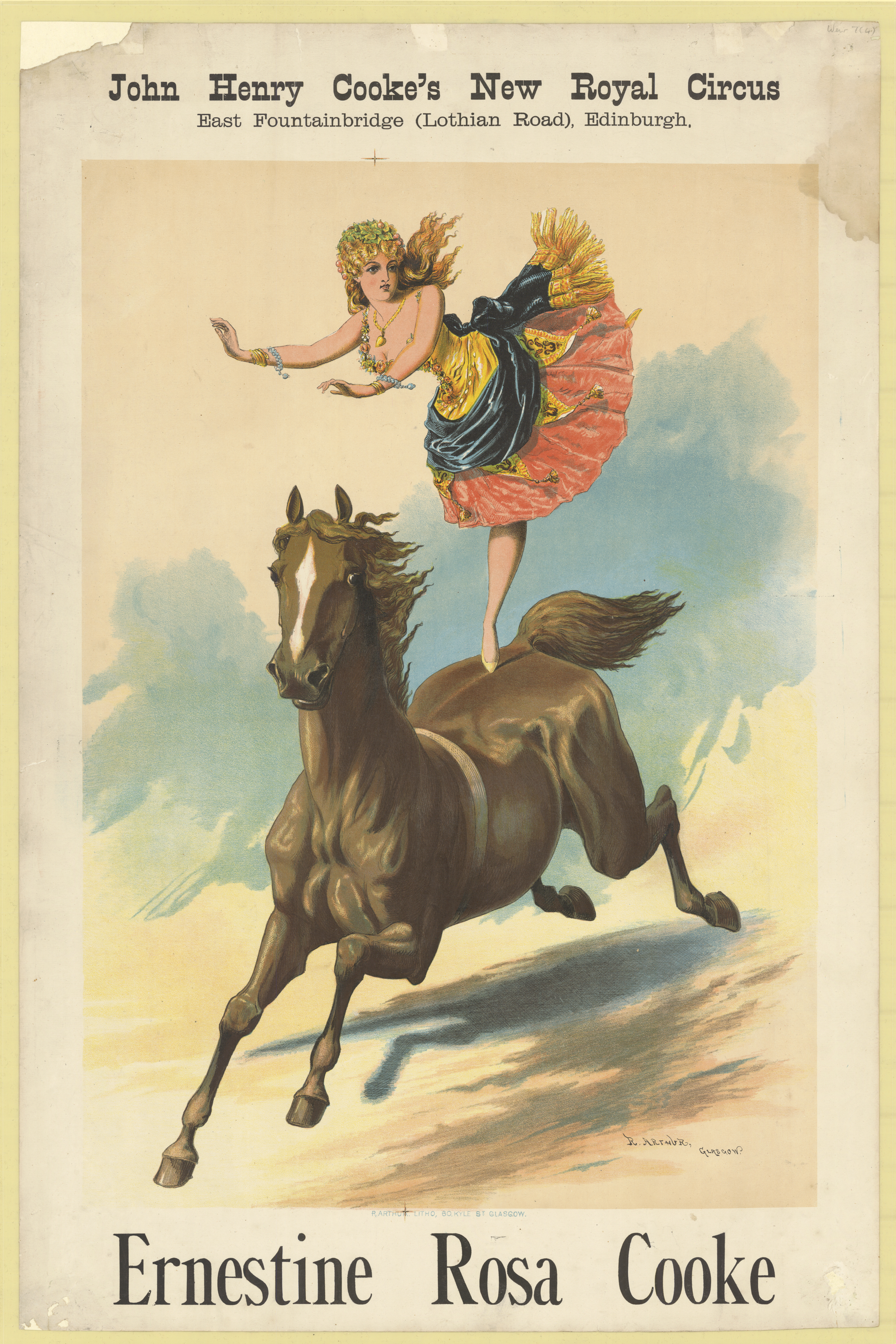
Ernestine Rosa Cooke – Weir Collection

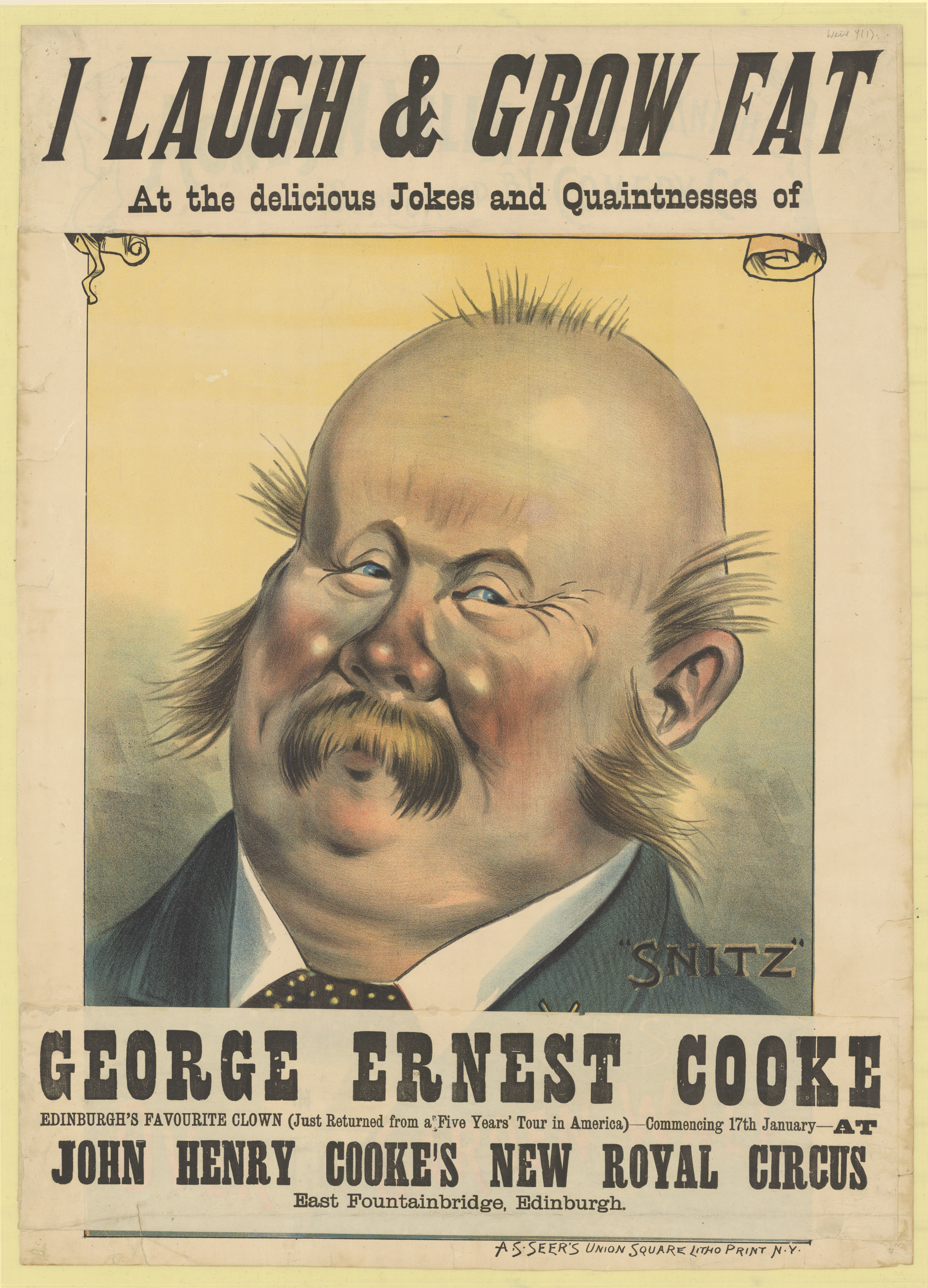
George Ernest Cooke – Weir Collection

Thomas Cooke was born in 1752. He founded Cooke's Circus around 1780 which was in Ayrshire in 1784 as a travelling show seen at Mauchline by Robert Burns.

Cooke's Circus travelled around cities and large towns in England and Scotland, specialising in equestrian acts, acrobats, strongmen and contortionists, many of whom were from Cooke's extended family. They were one of the more famous "circus families".

== Thomas Taplin Cooke ==
Thomas Taplin Cooke was born in Warwick in 1782, the son of Thomas Cooke and his wife, Mary Ann.

He took over his father's circus around 1810. In the autumn of 1830, following a pleasurable visit from King William IV and Queen Adelaide, the company adopted the name "Royal Circus" and retained this name for the remainder of their existence.

In 1835, the circus had a semi-permanent structure in Edinburgh (a circular timber structure) at the north end of Lothian Road but this had to be later moved when the Caledonian Railway was built. At this point (c.1850) the circus moved to Nicolson Street, where it was later supplanted by the Empire Theatre (now known as the Edinburgh Festival Theatre).

In 1836 he chartered "The Royal Stuart" from Greenock and two smaller vessels to convey the whole circus to America. 40 of the 130 artists were members of the Cooke family. This extended trip included prolonged programmes in New York, Boston and Walnut Street Philadelphia. At this stage their "pattern" was to erect a large circular building of a temporary nature (normally in wood). It is unclear how long this American tour was intended to last, but it met an abrupt end during their stay in Baltimore on 3 February 1838, when the Front Street Theater burnt down (note- there is some confusion as two "Front Street Theaters" burnt down within 5 weeks of each other: Baltimore on 5 Jan 1838, Buffalo on 3 February 1838). The Cooke's lost 50 horses and many items of wardrobe and props in this fire.

It appears that the circus had been used to operating from large theatres up to this point. Either during the American tour or following the fire disaster, Thomas Taplin Cooke, had a very large circular tent constructed. After a few more months in Philadelphia, he returned to Britain in the summer of 1838 with this large tent, which freed up the possible locations for the circus.

One very dramatic equestrian show was "Mazeppa" based on a poem by Byron, first performed in Philadelphia in 1838 and still playing until at least 1843 when it was showing at Birmingham in England. This concept was borrowed from Andrew Ducrow's show Mazeppa of 1831. In 1846, a similar style of show was based on the life of Dick Turpin.

Thomas Cooke died in 1866 in London and is buried in Kensal Green Cemetery. The grave is highly unique, carrying a statue of a horse "mourning".

== William Cooke ==
William Cooke was the son of Thomas Taplin Cooke who was born in 1808. He was a versatile acrobat and performer before setting up on his own (hiring Astley's Amphitheatre in London) for eleven years as a circus venue. His daughter Alice Maud Mary Ann Cooke married the London-based actor George Benjamin Belmore.

In May 1845 he was involved in the Yarmouth suspension bridge disaster where a very large crowd gathered on a bridge to view a novelty side show: a man being pulled along the river in a bathtub pulled by four geese. The death loss was due to inadequacies in the bridge construction rather than the event itself.

== James Cooke ==
James Thorpe Cooke (1810-1869) was an older son to Thomas Taplin Cooke. He appeared as the owner/manager of Cooke's Royal Circus in Edinburgh in 1846 (still a travelling show at this time). His grave in Dean Cemetery in Edinburgh describes him as an "equestrian manager".

== John Henry Cooke ==
John Henry Cooke was born in New York in 1837, the son of Henry Cooke during an unsuccessful tour of the family circus in America. He took over the Royal Circus in 1866, following the death of his uncle Thomas Taplin Cooke. Trained as an equestrian juggler in the family circus and toured with them in France and Spain. He also spent some years in other circuses: Astley's, Sanger's and Henry Hengler's.

In 1877, John Cooke moved the semi-permanent Edinburgh structure from Nicolson Street to Grindlay Street. Although still capable of touring, by the 1870s they were largely at a "permanent" home of a large tent. However, they were forced to vacate this site around 1882 in order for John B. Howard and Frederick W. P. Wyndham to construct a new building (now the Royal Lyceum Theatre). They moved the tent further out of the city towards Fountainbridge.

In 1886, John Cooke built the Royal Circus in East Fountainbridge giving a permanent home to the formerly travelling circus. It was designed by George Gilroy and had a central circular performance space surrounded by seating. Its opening night was on 8 November 1886 and he was compered by Harry Dale, a well-known Victorian entertainer and a clown in Cooke's circus. The animals were primarily horses and ponies but also included performing pigeons, dogs and goats!

The circus toured in Leith, Paisley, Greenock, Perth, Aberdeen and Dundee. The non-equestrian acts included "La Belle Sylvia West", dainty vocalist and dancer, "Horton and Onda" Chinese comedians, Lily and Elsie Judge and their performing cockatoos.

The circus closed in 1908 and the building was used as a cinema with the screen placed in the centre of the ring. Those viewing from behind paid half price.

The building was remodelled specifically as a cinema, the Palladium Theatre, in 1911 (during Cooke's lifetime).

John Cooke died in Edinburgh on 22 August 1917, aged 80. He is buried in Dean Cemetery, Edinburgh. The distinctive grave carries a bronze bust and lies in a northern section of the original cemetery.

== George Ernest Cooke ==
George Ernest Cooke (1851–1929) was a famous comedian and character actor. One of the many grandchildren of the founder and cousin of John Henry Cooke.

George Cooke went on the second American tour of the 1870s in his twenties and came to fame in this period.

George Cooke is buried with John Henry Cooke in Dean Cemetery.

== Other Cooke performers ==
The following members of the Cooke family also performed:

- Alfred Cooke, equestrian performer under T T Cooke
- Ellen Cooke, Equestrienne, wife of James Cooke
- Emily Henrietta Cooke (1843–1923), equestrienne, wife of John Henry Cooke, greatly admired by Alexander Dumas
- Ernestine Rosa Cooke was the daughter of Ernest. She was an acrobat and horse-performer.
- Edina Marion Cooke, youngest daughter of Ernest. Infant (from aged 4) horse trainer and performer with her pony "Bon Accord".
- George Cooke, equestrian
- Henry Cooke, acrobat
- Henry Welby Cooke, left Cooke's circus with his equestrienne wife to stay in USA
- James Edwin Cooke (1841–1907), horse leaper, a cousin detached from Cooke's circus
- Mary Anne Cooke (1818–1897), equestrienne and wire-walker, daughter of founder, married contortionist William H Cole. Parents to William Washington Cole Remained in USA after the first tour and his sister Florence Cole married to Maximilian Albert Schumann director of the Maximilian Schumann Circus of Copenhagen Denmark.Florence Cole took her ancestors stage name Victoria Cooke.

- Rosina Cooke (1846–1919) equestrienne, born on tour in Manchester sister of John Henry, married George "Grimaldi" Adams, a clown in the show, Died immensely rich.
- Thomas Edwin Cooke (1802–1897) clown, acrobat and tightrope walker, son of founder, born at Beck's Hill, married Miss Diprose
- Thomas Edwin Cooke (1835–1874) equestrian, son of Thomas Taplin Cooke debut at 18 months riding on a horse, sometime owner of the circus (1866 to 1874) killed in a fall in Liverpool
- William Cooke (1808–1886) did everything from clown to strong-man, son of T T Cooke
