= Charles John Smith =

English engraver (1803–1838)

Charles John Smith (1803–1838) was an English engraver.

== Life ==
He was born in 1803 at Chelsea where his father, James Smith, practised as a surgeon. He was a pupil of Charles Pye, and became an engraver of book illustrations of a topographical and antiquarian character. He was elected a Fellow of the Society of Antiquaries in 1837, and died of paralysis in Albany Street, London, on 23 November 1838.

== Works ==
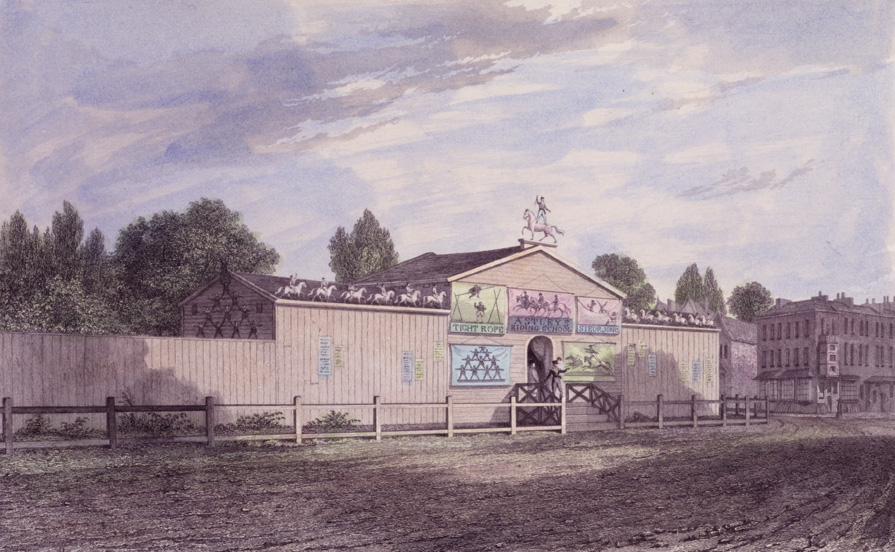
Astley's Amphitheatre, external view in 1777. Etching by Smith, after William Capon, hand-coloured.

He executed a few of the later plates in Charles Stothard's Monumental Effigies, the views of houses and monuments in Edmund Cartwright's Rape of Bramber, 1830, and plates from illuminated manuscripts for Thomas Frognall Dibdin's Tour in the Northern Counties of England, 1838. In 1829 Smith published a series of Autographs of Royal, Noble, and Illustrious Persons, with memoirs by John Gough Nichols, and later started another serial work, Historical and Literary Curiosities, which he did not live to complete.
