= Herr Christoff =

British tightrope walker (1826-1881)

- Born: George Frederick Christopher; 1826; Swansea, Wales
- Died: 13 June 1881 (aged 54–55); London, England
- Occupations: Tightrope walker; acrobat
- Known for: Tightrope walking

George Frederick Christopher (1826 – 13 June 1881), better known by the stage name Herr Christoff, was a British tightrope walker and acrobat.

== Early life ==
George Frederick Christopher was born of African descent in Swansea in 1826. He was the son of Kitt Christopher. George and his younger brother John first performed as children with their father, who appeared professionally as Signor Christoff. In London, his father performed street acts that included balancing cartwheels.

== Career ==
In July 1854, Herr Christoff first appeared at Astley's Amphitheatre under British circus proprietor William Cooke. He was billed as "the first rope dancer in the world" and "l'Empereur des Funambules". Christoff was recognized as the only performer of colour on the tightrope and was acclaimed for his exceptional skill. His act combined tightrope dancing with back somersaults, which he executed with or without a balancing pole, always landing on the rope.

He appeared at Hoxton's Britannia Theatre in October 1854. Christoff performed in Stockport with the circus of Pablo Fanque, the first Black circus owner in Britain, in November 1856. In December 1857, he joined William Cooke's troupe for performances at the Royal Amphitheatre in Liverpool, where he was advertised as "the greatest tight-rope artiste of the present age."

He performed at Sydney's Royal Victoria Theatre in October 1859. On 1 August 1860, he made his first tightrope performance at the Royal Alhambra Palace, organized by G. Van Hare.

Herr Christoff appeared as one of the headline acts with Gardiner’s American Circus in Geelong in 1863.

Christoff was engaged at great expense by A. Quaglieni. He made his first appearance with Quaglieni's Grand Cirque in Cardiff, Wales, in November 1864.

By 1867, Christoff was among the oldest and most celebrated performers in his field. His act was complemented by Madame Christoff, who performed as a clown, entertaining audiences with clever dances and witty remarks between the tightrope feats.

Christoff performed with James Cooke's Great World Circus in March 1867, giving a skillful exhibition on the tightrope. While in Sydney, he was billed as the "Blondin of Australia" in January 1868. He appeared at the Prince of Wales Opera House in December 1868 with the company of acrobats and equestrians.

Christoff joined Bird, Blow & Wills' Great American Circus in 1869. On 14 October 1869, he performed on the tightrope with his feet in two bushel baskets for the first time in New Zealand. He appeared with the company at Barnard's Repository in Christchurch in December 1869.

Christoff performed at the Queen's Theatre in England in The Last Days of Pompeii, a drama in five acts by John Oxenford, on 8 January 1872.

In November 1872, Herr Christoff performed in Dublin, Ireland, at the City Music Hall of Varieties (now City Varieties Music Hall). At the time, he was considered the only double somersault performer in the world. By 1874, he was working with Swallow's Grand Circus in Bolton.

== Death ==
George Christopher died at age 55 in London, England, on 13 June 1881.
