= Isabella Cubas =

Spanish dancer (1831-1864)

Isabella Cubas Prima ballerina assoluta
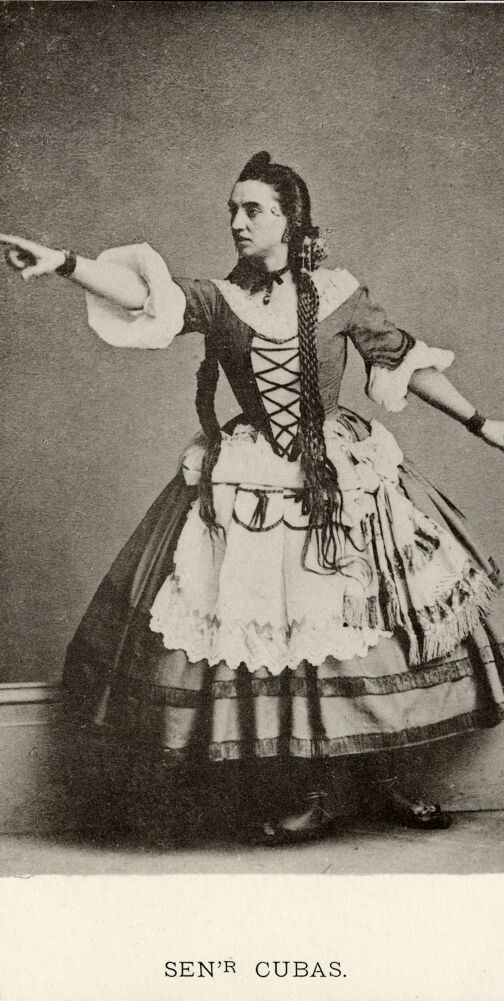
- Born: 1831; Cádiz, Province of Cádiz, Andalusia, Spain
- Died: June 20, 1864 (aged 32–33); New York, United States
- Resting place: Green-Wood Cemetery
- Other name: Isabel Cubas
- Occupation: Dancer
- Partner: Juan Ximenes

Isabella Cubas (1831 – June 20, 1864), also known as Señorita Isabel Cubas, was a Spanish danseuse and pantomimist.

== Early life ==
Isabella Cubas was born in Cádiz, Province of Cádiz, Andalusia, Spain in 1831.

Isabel was the daughter of Pepa Alfaro and actor John Cubas. Her father was counted among Spain's first actors, and her grandfather, Pedro Cubas, was one of Spain's top comic actors. Her mother danced at the Teatro Real. Belonging to a family of celebrated artists, she showed exceptional dance talent from an early age under her mother's guidance.

== Entertainment life ==
At 13 years old, she performed as a soloist in Madrid, Spain, and, following appearances in prominent Spanish theaters, returned to Madrid for two years.

She had performed in Turin and Milan before age 20, honored by Emperor Francis Joseph and his court at the Gello and Teatro San Benedetto; she also toured Venice, Bucharest, Odessa, Alexandria, Cairo, Brussels, Paris, and London.

In March 1857, she was a member of a Spanish dance company directed by Ambrogio Martinez, performing at the Royal Theater of Madrid. Cubas wore an old-fashioned dress reaching below the knee.

Cubas, the prima ballerina assoluta, performed at Naum Theatre in November 1858 in Istanbul (then Constantinople).

In January 1860, she performed at the Lyceum Theatre in London under Madame Céleste with a dance partner, Señor Juan Ximenes. From May 1 to October 1, 1860, Cubas and Ximenes made 20 guest appearances at the Königshalle, a historic hall in Lorsch, Germany. During the same year in June, she performed at the Kroll Opera House in Berlin. Cubas and Juan Ximenes also performed at the Theater in der Josefstadt in Vienna in October. In light of her successful October 31 debut in Linz, Austria, the theatre management granted Isabella Cubas a benefit performance on November 3, 1860.

Following performances at top opera houses in the Old World, she traveled to America in May 1861 and also made her debut in Canada. She performed in New York and Philadelphia, then embarked on a starring tour with a full corps de ballet, appearing in the country's leading theatres. New York audiences were introduced to Isabella Cubas and her dance partner in September 1861 at the Winter Garden Theatre, managed by James M. Nixon. In November 1861, in Worcester, Massachusetts, a ballet troupe, with Cubas as the leading attraction, performed at Mechanics Hall. She made her debut in Philadelphia, at the Academy of Music on December 5, 1861. In March 1862, Cubas, her partner, and a corps de ballet performed at the New York Academy.

Between May 19 and 23, 1862, Señorita Cubas and Señor Ximenes presented a Spanish ballet at the Grand Opera House with a corps de ballet of twenty, showcasing national dances from Spain, France, and Hungary.

The Spanish dancer decided to test herself as a pantomime actress. On October 6, 1862, Isabel Cubas performed in The French Spy at Nixon's Cremorne Garden. She performed three roles: M'me Mathilde, Henri St. Alme, and Hamet the spy.

In 1862, she was managed by T. Allston Brown. Following a lengthy New York engagement, she toured nationwide with Col. T. Alston Brown, who became a prominent theatrical agent in New York. Her performances drew consistently packed houses and enthusiastic receptions.

Cubas worked under Wyzeman Marshall at the Boston Theatre in 1863. In October 1863, she took the stage in The Wizard Skiff; or The Massacre of Scio. She also starred at the Walnut Street Theatre in Philadelphia in September 1863.

== Death ==
Isabella Cubas died in New York, United States on June 20, 1864, and was buried in Green-Wood Cemetery.
