= Thomas Taplin Cooke =

British circus proprietor (1782-1866)

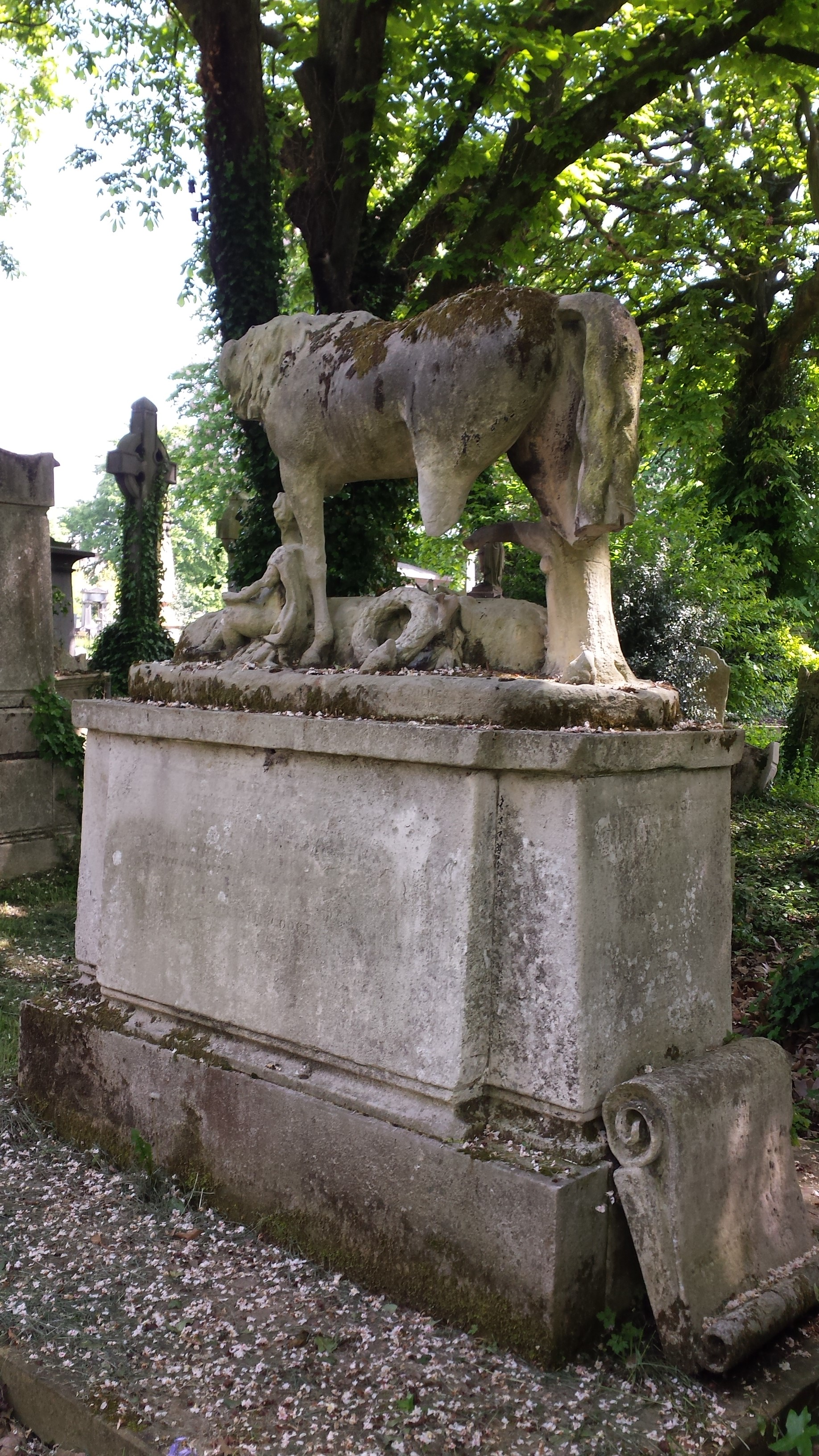
- Grave of the Cooke family at Kensal Green
- Born: Thomas Taplin Cooke; 1782; Warwick, England
- Died: 19 March 1866 (aged 83–84); London, England
- Resting place: Kensal Green Cemetery
- Occupation: Showman

Thomas Taplin Cooke (1782—19 March 1866) was an English showman, born in Warwick, who toured in America as well as his own country. In 1997, Cooke was inducted into the Circus Hall of Fame.

== Early life ==
Thomas Taplin Cooke was born in Warwick, England in 1782. His father, Thomas Cooke, was the founder of Cooke's Circus.

== Career ==
Thomas's career encompassed equestrian acts, tightrope walker stunts, and feats as a strongman.

By his late twenties, he succeeded his father in running the family business. Upon taking charge, he became one of the first English showmen to take a circus abroad. He toured Lisbon, Portugal, with a troupe in 1816. Many horses were lost at sea on the return from Spain, but, undeterred, he rebuilt his stable.

Performing at the Royal Pavilion in Brighton, England, on 18 September 1830, Cooke and his troupe of equestrians entertained King William IV and Queen Adelaide. He added "Royal" to the company name following the engagement, branding it "Cooke's Royal Circus."

He established permanent venues for his circus in Newcastle upon Tyne, Sunderland, and Hull during the early 1830s. In 1835, Cooke established Edinburgh's first circus.

Thomas Taplin Cooke was the first to bring an entire circus company across the Atlantic Ocean. He chartered a vessel in 1836 and brought his circus to the United States of America with 130 performers—forty from the Cooke family—including his seven sons and five daughters, along with servants, grooms, bandsmen, forty-two horses, and fourteen ponies. The voyage began from Greenock, Scotland, on 8 September 1836. The equestrian company led by Cooke arrived in New York City on 20 November 1836. Four days later, they debuted at New York Vauxhall Gardens then moved to the Bowery Theatre under William Dinneford until March 1837. After moving to the National Theatre under James Henry Hackett in late March, the circus traveled to Boston in mid-April and remained there through July. The circus launched at Cooke's new 2,000-seat venue in Philadelphia on 28 August 1837 and ran through to late December He moved his equestrian company to Baltimore, where it debuted at the Front Street Theatre on 28 December 1837. On 3 February 1838, a tragic fire in Baltimore destroyed Cooke's entire stable of horses and circus equipment. Cooke's property was not insured, and the estimated losses amounted to $42,000. Generous donations enabled the English showman to try again in Philadelphia in March. He presented a new stable of American horses and the spotted horse Mazeppa from Thomas Hamblin in the production, which concluded by May 1838. He returned to England, building wooden amphitheatres while his family expanded with additional children and grandchildren.

== Personal life ==
Cooke was said to have had between thirteen and nineteen children, who were mostly circus performers, including William and James Thorpe Cooke. He and his wife, Mary Anne, had a daughter Rebecca who married James Clements Boswell and their daughter was the equestrian performer Nellie Boswell. Another daughter, Mary Anne (1819-1897), married clown and contortionist William H. Cole; with their son, William Washington "Chilly Billy" Cole, she helped manage their Cole circus. At his death, her son's estate was valued at $5 million.

== Death ==
Thomas Taplin Cooke died at 84 years old on 19 March 1866 in Brompton, London, England. On 23 March 1866, Cooke was laid to rest in Kensal Green Cemetery, in the family vault of his son William.

After his death, management of his circus passed to his nephew John Henry Cooke.
