= Richard Usher =

Richard Usher (1785 – 23 September 1843) was an English clown and theatre designer. He performed for many years at Astley's Amphitheatre.

== Early life and career ==
He was born in 1785. His father, the proprietor of a mechanical exhibition, travelled in the north of England and in Ireland. Richard took a share in the management of the exhibition, and inherited his father's talent in the construction of curious contrivances. With a friend he gave exhibitions in Newcastle, Manchester, Liverpool, and other towns. At Christmas 1807 he appeared at the Liverpool Amphitheatre as a clown, and was immediately successful.

In 1809 he first appeared at Astley's Amphitheatre in London, and remained popular there for many years. His annual benefit was an occasion on which extraordinary performances took place both in and out of the theatre. The most remarkable of these took place in 1828, when in a washing-tub drawn by geese he sailed down the Thames from Westminster to Waterloo Bridge. He was then to have proceeded in a car drawn by eight cats to the Coburg Theatre, but the crowd in the Waterloo Road made this impossible, and he was carried to the theatre on the shoulders of several watermen.

Usher was known in the profession as the John Kemble of his art, and in the ring was the counterpart of Grimaldi on the stage, never descending to coarseness or vulgarity; his manner was irresistibly comic, and his jokes remarkable for their point and originality. He was the writer and inventor of several stock pantomimes.

== Later years ==
With increasing years he gave up clowning, and confined himself to invention and design. William Batty purchased Astley's Amphitheatre and rebuilt the house in 1842; refusing to employ an architect, it was rebuilt according to Usher's plans and models.

Usher died at Hercules Buildings, Lambeth, London, on 23 September 1843. His obituary in the Gentleman's Magazine wrote: "For the last half century no man had contributed more to the amusement of the public… his name is familiar as a household word from the Shetlands [sic] to Cape Clear."

== Family ==
He married firstly Mrs. Pincott (the mother of Leonora Pincott, wife of Alfred Wigan); secondly, a sister of James William Wallack, who survived him with a family.

His son Alfred Usher was a violinist and orchestra leader, active in Sydney, Australia by 1857.
