= Front Street Theater =

- Front Street Theater in 1864
- Interactive map of Front Street Theater
- Address: Baltimore, Maryland; United States
- Coordinates: 39°17′32″N 76°36′25″W

Construction
- Opened: September 10, 1829; December 3, 1838
- Closed: February 3, 1838; December 27, 1895
- Demolished: 1904
- Architect: William Minifie

The Front Street Theater was a theater in Baltimore that was open from 1829 until 1895. It hosted the re-convened 1860 Democratic National Convention that nominated Stephen A. Douglas and the 1864 National Union National Convention which nominated Abraham Lincoln. On December 27, 1895, a panic arose after a woman shouted fire in the crowded theater, causing a crowd crush that resulted in 26 deaths. Afterwards, the theater was abandoned. It was destroyed in 1904 by the Great Baltimore Fire.

== First theater ==
The Front Street Theatre was built on the southwest corner of Front and Low Streets, which had been the site of the Olympic Theatre until it was deemed unsafe and torn down. In 1827, theater promoters Edmund Simpson and Joseph Cowell proposed building a new theater on the property. In 1829, a joint stock company was created to fund the project. The four-story brick structure was designed and constructed by Charles Grover at a cost of $27,000 ($816,328 in 2025). It was designed to be used by both theater and circus companies. There were three entrances on Front Street and a side entrance for black patrons. At the time of its construction, it was the largest theater in the United States. It opened as the New Theatre and Circus on September 10, 1829. Its first manager was William Blanchard, who had managed circus and theater tours in the U.S. and Canada.

In 1837, Thomas Taplin Cooke moved Cooke's Royal Circus to the theater after its home in Philadelphia was destroyed by fire. On February 3, 1838, the Front Street Theater, along with Cooke's entire stable of horses and circus equipment, was destroyed by a fire. The property was not insured, and Cooke's estimated losses amounted to $42,000 ($1.27 million in 2025). The theater was further damaged by a tornado on May 22, 1838.

== Second theater ==
Following the fire, a new ownership group was formed to rebuild the theater. The second Front Street Theater was designed by William Minifie and opened on December 3, 1838.

In December 1848, William Macready starred in production of Macbeth at the Front Street Theater while his rival, Edwin Forrest, appeared in a competing performance at the Holliday Street Theater. Their rivalry would lead to the Astor Place Riot five months later. In 1850, the Front Street Theater hosted the first Baltimore performance of Jenny Lind. Tickets for her four concerts brought in about $60,000 ($2.32 million in 2025).

In August 1854, Margaret Tuckett, an English actress and the widow of Harvey Tuckett, leased the theater. She spent $13,000 ($465,833 in 2025) renovating and redecorating the theater, which reopened on September 1, 1855. She believed the theater's receipts would cover the debt she incurred fixing up the theater, but her treasurer absconded with the money. She continued to put on shows, including The Golden Farmer starring John Sleeper Clarke, but was forced to leave due to unpaid rent in March 1856.

After failing to nominate a candidate for the at the Democratic National Convention in Charleston, South Carolina, the delegates voted to reassemble in Baltimore on June 18. The Front Street Theater was chosen to host the reconvened convention, which nominated Stephen A. Douglas for president after it was decided to substitute delegates from Louisiana and Alabama who had walked out of the convention with pro-Douglas delegates. This decision led to the remaining Southern delegates to walk and form their own convention. During the convention, part of the stage collapsed and sent around 100 delegates crashing to the floor.

The theater also hosted the 1864 National Union National Convention, which nominated incumbent Abraham Lincoln for president and Andrew Johnson for vice president.

In 1864, the Front Street Theater became home to Kunkel's Nightingales, a minstrel show, after George Kunkel became the theater's manager.

In 1870, the theater was leased to William E. Sinn, who ran it with as a variety theater.

From 1880 to 1893, the theater was leased by actor Daniel A. Kelly, during which time it was known as Kelly's Front Street Theatre. He starred in and wrote many of the theater's shows, one of which, The Shadow Detective, was successful enough that it became a touring play with over 2,000 performances.

== Crowd crush ==
On December 27, 1895, the theater hosted performance of Alexander, the Crown Prince of Jerusalem put on by the United States Oriental Opera and Dramatic Company, a touring Yiddish theater company. 2,500 people, most of whom were from Baltimore's Polish Jewish community, were in the theater when the play began.

At the start of the play, an odor of gas was noticed coming from a gallery to the left of the stage. A theater employee was sent to fix and either lit a match or brought a lighted torch near a punctured gas pipe, which caused a six-inch flame to shoot out from the wall. This caused someone to shut off gas supply at the meter, plunging the main theater into darkness. The stage, however, remained illuminated, as it was fed through a different meter. The gas was quickly turned on through this second meter and the theater lights came back on. However, the flash caused a cry of fire and a stampede for the exit.

Officers from the Baltimore Police Department entered the theater and found the bodies of nine people who had been trampled in the crush. Another 17 died later from their injuries.

The Front Street Theater disaster was investigated by a grand jury over three days. It reported that it was "unable to fix the blame on any particular person or persons" and could not recommend any criminal charges. It did, however, recommended that "all buildings used for the assemblage of the public in great numbers...be carefully inspected on each evening prior to the assembling of the audience, and if for any reason, in [the Chief of the Fire Department's] judgment, such buildings are not safe, no audience shall be allowed to assemble".

== Aftermath ==
The Front Street Theater remained abandoned for many years after the crush. It was condemned and scheduled for demolition, but was destroyed in 1904 by the Great Baltimore Fire before it could be torn down.
