= Harvey Tuckett =

British army officer, actor and actuary

- Born: Harvey Garnet Phipps Tuckett; 17 November 1799; Saint Kitts, British Leeward Islands
- Died: 2 January 1854 (aged 54); Philadelphia, Pennsylvania, U.S.

Harvey Garnet Phipps Tuckett (17 November 1799 – 2 January 1854) was a British army officer, actor and actuary.

Tuckett was an officer in an English cavalry regiment who, in 1838 after long service in England and India, retired on half pay to become an actor. Shortly after his retirement from the army he defended himself in a duel with Lord Cardigan, his former commanding officer, and was severely wounded in the hip. He emigrated to the U.S. and became an actuarial adviser to life insurance companies in Philadelphia.

== Army service ==
Tuckett joined the army on 7 February 1815, purchasing a commission as Ensign in the 87th Regiment of Foot. After service In Guernsey and Gibraltar he was posted to India on 30 December 1829. He transferred to the 11th Hussars, a fashionable cavalry regiment, on 23 September 1823 with the rank of lieutenant. At the end of December 1825 he took part in the Siege of Bharatpur.

== Duel ==
Towards the end of Tuckett's long service as a lieutenant (later captain) with the 11th Hussars in India he first encountered Lord Cardigan, who took command of Tuckett's regiment at the end of 1837. Cardigan endeavoured to apply the same exacting standards in India as he had demanded of his former commands in England, but this was not popular. He noted that Tuckett "wrote several slanders and calumnies about me" in letters to Bombay newspapers, in which Tuckett alleged an excess of harsh discipline and a disproportionate number of courts-martial. On 2 November 1838, shortly after the regiment returned to England, Tuckett retired from the army, taking a "half pay" pension. Cardigan's conduct as commanding officer of the 11th Hussars continued to be the subject of widespread criticism for his unreasonable behaviour and when, on 18 May 1840, he rashly arrested one of his officers for insubordination, the incident added to his notoriety. Tuckett, using the pen-name of "An Old Soldier", wrote to The Morning Post describing what had occurred. Cardigan demanded of the Post the identity of the writer and the newspaper complied. Accordingly, Cardigan "called out" Tuckett to a duel.

The encounter took place at Wimbledon Common at 5 p.m. on 12 September 1840 and Tuckett received a serious wound from a pistol shot, which entered the upper part of his right hip bone and exited in the middle of his back. Both men were charged. The charge against Tuckett was "maliciously shooting at, with intent to murder, James Thomas Earl of Cardigan". Tuckett was acquitted at the Old Bailey on 18 October 1840. Cardigan was acquitted, on "an absurd technical deficiency", at a trial at the House of Lords on 16 February 1841, because the man whom he acknowledged he had wounded—"Captain Harvey Tuckett, formerly of the 11th Hussars"—was not sufficiently identified as the victim.

== Civilian career ==
On 31 May 1841 Tuckett, backed up by two friends from the army, assaulted without provocation a train passenger at Greenwich. He was arrested when the train arrived at its London destination but was acquitted of assault on the passenger (and of assaulting the police officer who took him into custody) because the original offence, although proved, had taken place beyond the City of London court's jurisdiction.

=== Actor ===
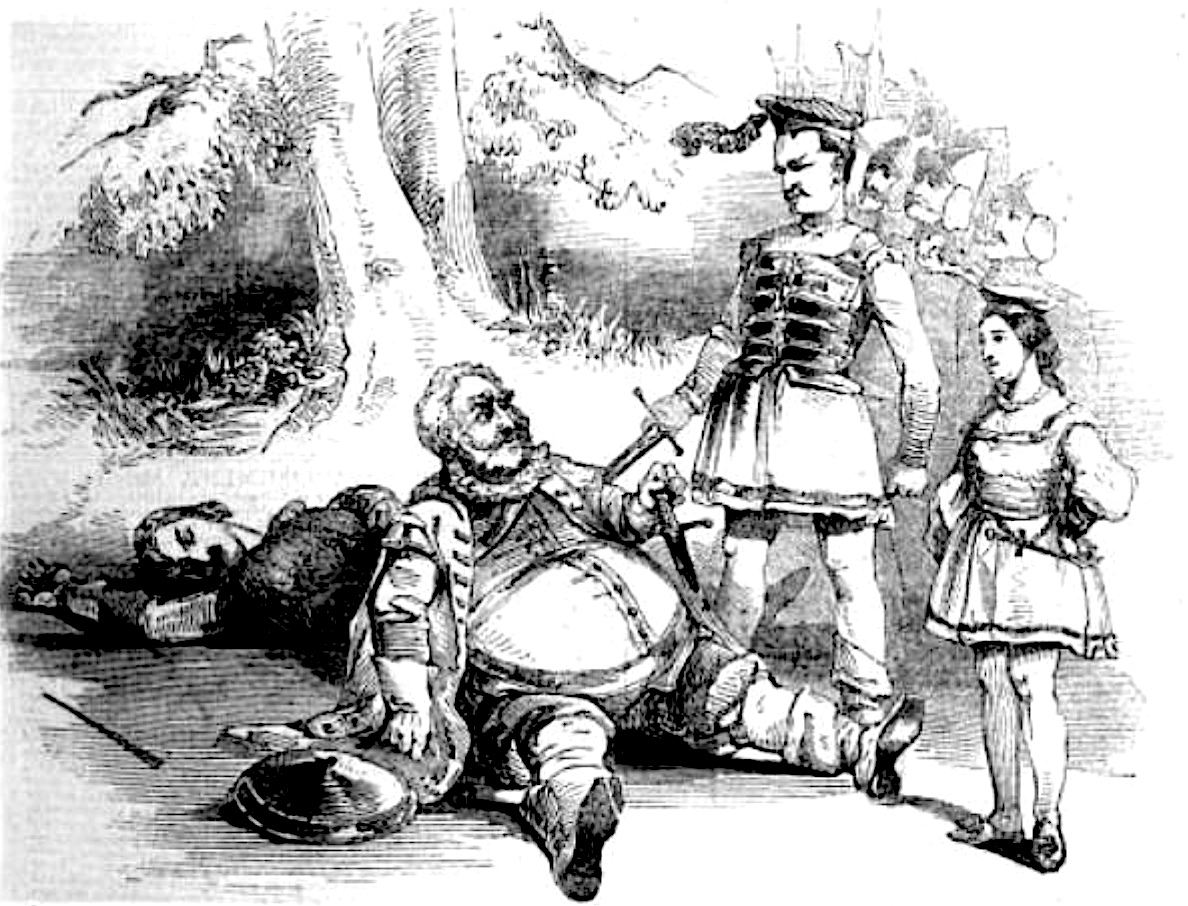
Harvey Tuckett (centre) as Falstaff, Lyceum Theatre, London, February 1844

Tuckett involved himself in many ventures after leaving the Army, experiencing, as an annual news review recounted: "much of life, as a merchant, agent, actor, and bankrupt". Because of his duelling injury he walked with a limp for the rest of his life, but he recovered sufficiently to become a player with a company of actors touring in Britain and Ireland, drawing on his experience of amateur theatre in India. Reactions to his stage appearances were often critical but, by capitalising on his celebrity from the duel, Tuckett gained backing for a production of Henry IV Part 1, in which he played Sir John Falstaff. His performance in the role at London's Lyceum Theatre, opening on 12 January 1844, gained appreciative reviews, although the production itself was criticised for its sparse scenery and indifferent supporting cast—some were amateur players. A critic noted that the actor's naturally stout physique rendered unnecessary the heavy padding customarily needed to portray the old, fat knight. The final performance, in what was considered a very short run in front of "empty benches", was a benefit performance for Tuckett on 12 February 1844.

Tuckett's interpretation of Rolando in The Honey Moon, mounted at the Lyceum in the weeks following, failed to impress. The Theatre Royal, Bristol, put out a playbill for a benefit performance marking his last stage appearance, again as Falstaff, on 8 March 1844. Further "last appearances" followed: for example "[…]his Falstaff was a failure" at the Theatre Royal, Edinburgh, on 11 May 1844. In May 1844 he expanded his repertoire to include Jack Rover in Wild Oats in Glasgow and an "audacious" appearance as Charles Goldfinch in The Road To Ruin at the Theatre Royal, Brighton, playing in repertory with Henry, in August 1844. In November 1844 Tuckett took the lead role in Don Cæsar de Bazan by Gilbert à Beckett at a small theatre in Abbey Street, Dublin.

By June 1847 an actors' directory noted that Tuckett had moved to America, continuing his stage career in New York. On 26 October 1847 at the Arch Street Theatre, Philadelphia, he appeared as Jeremy Diddler in James Kenney's 1803 farce Raising the Wind.

=== Mercenary soldier ===
In 1846 in Ireland Tuckett was commissioned to raise a private mercenary force, led by other half-pay officers, to restore Juan José Flores, overthrown president of Ecuador, to power. Tuckett revealed the plot to the authorities and when Colonel Richard Wright, Flores's representative in London, was arrested as organiser, Tuckett gave evidence against him. After the trial he was subject to a harsh reception from the other conspirators.

=== Bankrupt ===
Even before Tuckett's regiment relocated to England, with its far higher living expenses than he experienced in India, Tuckett was at risk of being declared bankrupt. In January 1839, seeking to repair his finances in England, he became a promoter of the West Kent Gas-light, Coke and Coal Company of Gravesend, and in August of that year of a newly formed bank: the British Agriculturists' and Graziers' Joint Stock Banking Company, with an office near the Smithfield cattle market in London. He joined a partnership of "Merchants and East India Army and Colonial Agents", with offices in Poultry, London, but this was dissolved on 28 April 1842. All his ventures failed, and he was declared bankrupt on 2 December 1842.

=== Insurance actuary ===
After Tuckett's theatrical career in Philadelphia ended, he set up a business in the city offering actuarial advice to life insurance companies there, adopting US nationality on 20 December 1852. In 1851 he published the pamphlet Practical Remarks on the Present State of Life Insurance in the United States. In 1852 the first issue of Tuckett's Monthly Insurance Journal, Health and Friendly Societies' Monitor appeared, which he continued to publish until his death on 2 January 1854.

== Family ==
On 10 March 1825 at Meerut, India, Tuckett was married to Jemima Slater. She died in London 13 May 1843. His first son, James Phipps Tuckett, was born at Meerut on 29 January 1826. There were four daughters to the marriage. Another son was born in London in December 1838. James Thomas Tuckett of Norwood, England, was the administrator of his parents' separate estates.

On 2 March 1854, shortly after Tuckett's death in Philadelphia, his widow Margaret, an actress of long standing in England, opened as the country girl "Margery" in John Buckstone's farce Rough Diamond at the Chestnut Street Theatre, Philadelphia. Later, she became manager of the Front Street Theatre, Baltimore.

== In fiction ==
In March 1868 a fictionalised account of Tuckett's life, likening him to the cavalry officer Rawdon Crawley in the novel Vanity Fair, was published as a short story in The Atlantic magazine, Boston. The tale describes how Tuckett deliberately provokes Cardigan's challenge to duel because of Cardigan's earlier refusal to answer Tuckett's own challenge for attempting to seduce his wife.
