= William Cooke (performer) =

British circus proprietor (1808–1886)

- Born: William Cooke; 1808; England
- Died: May 6, 1886; Brixton, London, England
- Resting place: Kensal Green Cemetery
- Occupations: Showman; Circus proprietor
- Father: Thomas Taplin Cooke
- Relatives: James Thorpe Cooke (brother); Alfred Cooke (brother); Thomas Cooke (grandfather)

William Cooke (1808 – May 6, 1886) was an English showman, animal trainer, and circus proprietor who leased Astley's Amphitheatre in London.

== Early life ==
William Cooke was born in England during the early nineteenth century. He was the second son of Thomas Taplin Cooke, proprietor of Cooke's Royal Circus. William was a third-generation member of the renowned English circus family. He had two brothers: James (1810–1869) and Alfred Cooke (1821–1854).

== Circus life ==
With his younger brother James Thorpe Cooke excelling in equestrianism, William pursued a career as a clown, rope-walker, and strongman. In 1834, he established his own circus company. He gradually shifted from performer to director of equestrian dramas and trainer of ring animals.

Cooke ran his company as a touring act and occasionally leased fixed theatres. Each town appearance began with a grand cavalcade led by William Cooke in his charabanc, drawn by ten Skewbald horses. The vehicle carried a brass band, followed by a carved "Dragon Car" and various carriages. Each show ended with a spectacle invented by his father based on St. George And The Dragon, with William Cooke appearing as St. George of England.

In early 1845, a violent gust of wind tore down his circus structure at Hackney, London just before a scheduled performance. The collapse resulted in two deaths, and several audience members narrowly escaped injury. Cooke offered to cover all expenses incurred by the families of the deceased. Later, upon relocating the circus to East India Road in Poplar, Cooke donated the proceeds from one night's performance to a fund supporting victims of the Gipsy Queen maritime disaster.

Arriving in Great Yarmouth on May 2, 1845, William Cooke's Royal Circus opened with an event staged on the River Bure that drew hundreds to the nearby Yarmouth suspension bridge. When the bridge gave way, 78 people lost their lives. Following the bridge disaster, he closed the circus there and transferred the company to London, reportedly in preparation for an appearance at an East End theatre during the Whitsuntide holidays. Cooke brought his London equestrian company to Torquay and Teignmouth in June, and to Dawlish on July 1. From July 2 to 4, 1845, his company held performances in a pavilion on Queen Street in Exeter.

He brought his circus to Saffron Walden in 1847 and held performances in a pavilion set up on the common. The tireless manager drew large audiences in Plymouth, with the circus filled to capacity each evening. On March 23, 1848, one of his performances was attended by Thomas Cochrane, 10th Earl of Dundonald. Cooke's equestrian company, featuring British and foreign artists, toured through Exmouth, Salterton, Sidmouth, Colyton, Lyme Regis, and Bridport in June 1848. They later visited Linton, New Market, and Cambridge in October 1848. The performance in Cambridge drew patronage from the mayor Charles F. Foster and leading members of the local elite. He erected a circus on Moor Street in Birmingham for performances from February 26 to 28, 1849. On February 25, 1850, he launched a circus showcasing equestrian performances on the north side of Boar Lane in Leeds. Cooke's troupe performed in Bungay on September 17, 1850.

Cooke outfitted the newly built Bingley Hall on Broad Street in Birmingham to replicate a Roman amphitheatre, where his company opened in February 1851. Built by Branson & Gwyther to seat 3,000, the building became a venue for classical festivals and Olympian Games, presented by Cooke's renowned troupe and impressive stable of horses.

On February 9, 1852, he opened in Bath after traveling from Plymouth. The troupe was billed as "William Cooke's Colossal Equestrian Establishment." He had also set up William Cooke's Equestrian Establishment in Bristol, with performances attended by prominent families from Bristol, Clifton, and surrounding neighborhoods. He began his first provincial tour of "William Cooke's Colossal Hippodrome" in May 1852, with 100 horses and ponies, 30 carriages, and a variety of trained animals, including elephants and racing ostriches. The hippodrome, designed as an amphitheatre, used 40,000 feet of canvas and seated up to 11,000 people.

=== Astley's Amphitheatre ===
William Cooke took over the lease and management of Astley's Amphitheatre from William Batty. He maintained control of the venue from 1853 until 1860.

His travelling circus kept him afloat throughout the duration of the 7-year lease. He launched his second provincial tour in November 1853 with the "Colossal Hippodrome Circus," a 5,000-seat Roman-style amphitheatre. William owned the enterprise, and Henry Cooke led the tour as manager and director.

At Astley's on January 19, 1854, he introduced a triple attraction with a pantomime, an equestrian arena, and a zoological act that included the Wise Elephants of the East, a performance of trained elephants. In March 1854, Cooke presented The Woodman's Horse and The False Knight, training his pet steed named Beauty as the Woodman's horse himself. When the Royal Equestrian Programme took the stage, Cooke handled both the equestrian introductions and the performance arrangements. His first annual complimentary benefit took place on April 3, 1854. That year, the equestrian manager staged his first large-scale hippodramatic show based on the Battle of the Alma by Joachim Hayward Stocqueler. It premiered at Astley's Royal Amphitheatre in November 1854. On its opening night, several performers were injured by gunfire, despite the use of blank ammunition. The incident forced Cooke to pay compensation nearly equal to the show's expected profits.

William Cooke's Royal Circus toured the West Midlands in May 1855, stopping in Birmingham, West Bromwich, and Dudley. Later that year in September, the traveling show went to Cambridge, followed by stops in Newmarket, Ely, March, Peterborough, Spalding, Holbeach, Long Sutton, Wisbech, and Lynn. Cooke's circus arrived in Plymouth on June 17, 1856, to perform for three days.

After debuting with the Battle of Alma, Cooke found success with horse-led Shakespearian revivals. He presented horseback versions of four Shakespeare plays: Richard III, Macbeth, The Taming of the Shrew, and Henry IV. He debuted the equestrian version of Richard III based on Richard III and his horse, at Astley's Amphitheatre on August 4, 1856. The production ran in London for one hundred consecutive nights.

He announced a series of equestrian performances at the Royal Amphitheatre in Liverpool in December 1857.

William Cooke made his first appearance in Edinburgh on February 22, 1858. He appeared with his black mare named Raven, alongside featured artists like Herr Christoff and Alfred Palmer, among others. On April 23, 1858, Cooke and his troupe paid a visit to Rochdale Theatre Royal. At Oldham Theatre Royal on April 24, 1858, the company's two performances amounted to £150. Cooke's Circus opened in Macclesfield Theatre Royal on April 26 and in Congleton on April 27, 1858. In October 1858, their stops included Haverhill, Cambridge, Saffron Walden, Bishop's Stortford, Waltham Abbey, and London.

As part of his act at Astley's, he employed the Rarey technique to tame difficult and unmanageable horses. In December 1858, a horse that he was training unexpectedly collapsed on him, causing a break in his leg.

When the lease at Astley's came to an end, William Batty proposed raising the rent or selling the site. Cooke declined and opted to leave. His farewell performance took place on January 30, 1860.

== Death ==
William Cooke died on May 6, 1886, in Brixton, London, England.

His remains were placed in the family vault at Kensal Green Cemetery, alongside his brother Alfred and his father Thomas T. Cooke.
