= Yarmouth suspension bridge =

Spanned the River Bure at Great Yarmouth, Norfolk, collapsed in 1845

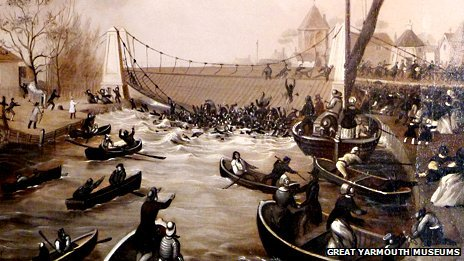
- Depiction of the 1845 bridge collapse by an eyewitness
- Coordinates: 52.612253°N 1.723030°E
- Carried: Yarmouth-Acle road
- Crossed: River Bure
- Owner: Cory family

Characteristics
- Width: 14 feet 9 inches (4.50 m)
- Longest span: 86 feet (26 m)
- No. of spans: 1

History
- Architect: Joseph John Scoles
- Constructed by: Gidney Goddard
- Opened: 23 April 1829
- Collapsed: 2 May 1845

Location
- Interactive map of Yarmouth suspension bridge

Yarmouth suspension bridge spanned the River Bure at Great Yarmouth, Norfolk from 1829 until its collapse in 1845. The bridge was widened in 1832, which had not been anticipated by the original design. On 2 May 1845, the bridge collapsed under load from a crowd who had gathered to watch a circus stunt on the river. Some 79 people, mainly children, were killed. An investigation found fault with the design and quality of the bridge. A modern-day memorial marks the site of the disaster.

== Bridge ==
An Act of Parliament was passed in 1827 for the construction of a bridge over the River Bure at Great Yarmouth. The Cory family paid for the bridge to replace a ferry and provide easier access from the town to marshland, the Vauxhall Pleasure Gardens, and a bowling green owned by the family. A toll on those crossing would recoup the investment. The architect for the bridge was Joseph John Scoles of London. He designed a suspension bridge with two towers and a clear span of 63 feet (19 m). The span was later increased on-site to 86 feet (26 m) and the suspension chains increased in length accordingly, but it is not thought that Scoles was consulted on this matter (it would be considered usual to increase the height of the towers to match the lengthened chains).

The bridge was supported by a suspension chain at both edges of the deck, each chain being formed from two sets of 7/8 inch (22 mm) thick eyebars which had been made by a local blacksmith. The suspension chain was tied back to the bank and ran over the tops of two sets of pyramidal cast iron towers, on piled foundations, some 92 feet (28 m) apart. The chain sagged by 9 feet (2.7 m) between the towers. The magnitude of this sag was unaltered from the original design, despite the length of bridge being increased.

The deck was attached to the suspension chains by vertical iron rods. The 14-foot-9-inch (4.50 m) wide deck was slightly arched and carried a central single carriageway of 6 feet 9 inches (2.06 m) width and two footways each 4 feet (1.2 m) in width. The bridge was constructed by Gidney Goddard, supervised by Mr Green, a local surveyor.

The bridge opened for public use on 23 April 1829. Scoles attended the opening, the first time he had attended the site. In 1832 the road from Yarmouth to Acle was routed over the bridge. This had not originally been intended and, to provide sufficient width for two carriages to pass each other, the bridge was widened by some 2 feet (0.61 m) on each side in 1844. The railing was also moved to the extreme edge of the widened deck, which was thereby increased in width to 19 feet 10 inches (6.05 m).

== Disaster of 2 May 1845 ==
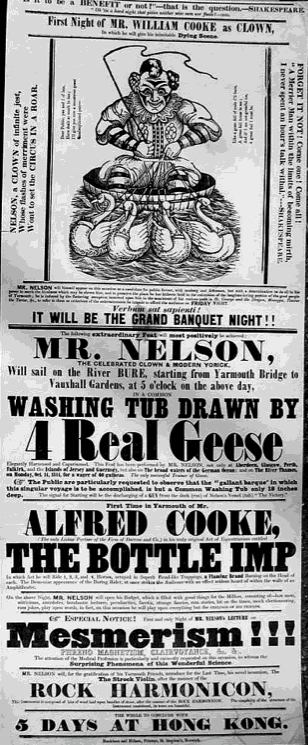
Cooke's Circus poster advertising Nelson's stunt

Cooke's Royal Circus was in Great Yarmouth, and as part of a promotion, it was advertised that a clown, named Arthur Nelson, would sail up the River Bure in a washtub pulled by four geese on 2 May 1845. The trick, first devised by Dicky Usher in 1809, was achieved by having the tub attached to a rowboat by an underwater line. A large crowd assembled in the vicinity from around 5 pm to view the feat which started with the flood tide. Several thousand people viewed the clown from the river banks and at least 300 in a crowd 4–5 deep on the southern footway of the bridge. The crowd concentrated at the south-eastern corner of the bridge, though the bridge was far from full as the carriageway was still passable to carts.

At around 5.40 pm, one of the eyebars in the southern suspension chain failed; members of the crowd witnessed this, but no action seemed to have been taken to evacuate the bridge. The second eyebar in that portion of the chain took up the full load for around five minutes before it too failed. The south side of the deck fell into the river, though the north end remained suspended by the surviving chain, and the majority of the crowd were tipped into the water, which at this point was 7 feet (2.1 m) deep. Children, who formed much of the front rank of the crowd, were crushed against the parapet railing by those behind them. One child was saved from being swept away by her mother holding onto her clothes with her teeth. A horse and cart was at the point of crossing when the collapse happened and was saved from falling into the river by the horse backing up in fright.

Boats soon arrived on the scene to rescue the victims. The wounded and dead were taken to nearby houses and pubs (including the Norwich Arms, the Admiral Collingwood and the Swan). The Union House hotel supplied blankets for the wounded, and Lacons Brewery made quantities of hot water available for hot baths to revive the survivors. Some 75 bodies were recovered on the day of the accident, though some remained trapped in the wreckage of the bridge – one man was rescued alive sometime later after being freed with a crowbar. In all, 79 people were killed in the disaster, of whom 59 were children. Most of the dead were under 13 years of age, and the youngest victim was two years old. The news was conveyed by electric telegraph and was known in Norwich within 5 minutes of the accident. Messages were passed by this means to family members of those killed, injured, or missing.

=== Investigation ===
The coroner's inquest was held the next day in a local church hall. The British government commissioned a report by James Walker, past-president of the Institution of Civil Engineers (ICE). Walker found that Scoles' original specification correctly called for high-quality iron to be used for the eyebars but failed to specify any testing of the product. He found that the second failure occurred in a joint within the eyebars – each of which had been forged from three separate pieces: two eyes and a bar. The scarf joint between the components had been imperfectly welded, with the weld covering only one-third of the joint's surface area. Had the welds been carried out correctly it is likely that the rods would not have failed. Walker also noted that the rod portion of the eyebars was made of better quality iron than the eyes and that the second rod to fail had extended by around an inch under the load imposed.

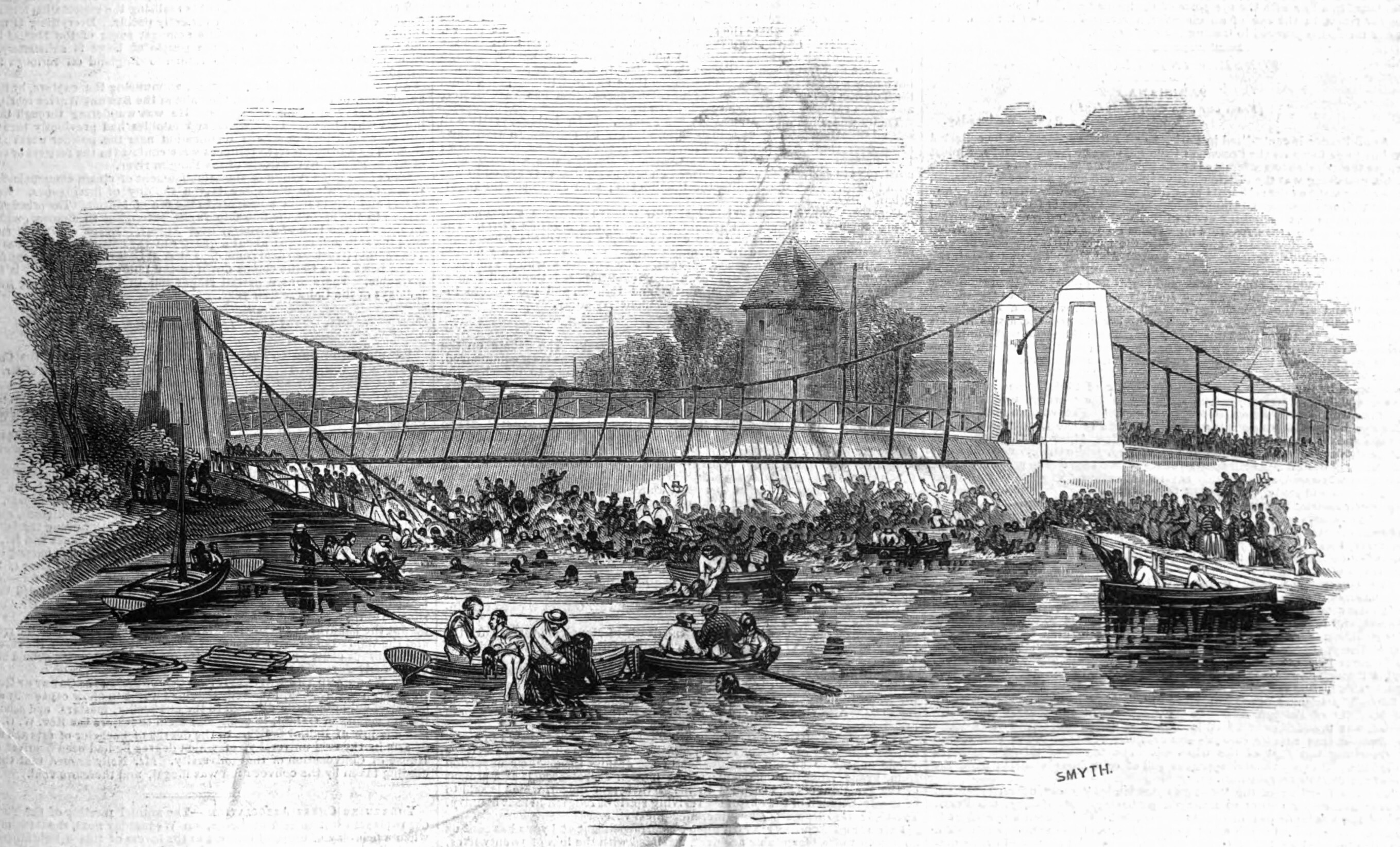
Depiction of the collapse in the Illustrated London News

Norwich ICE member William Thorold visited the scene of the accident on 3 May to inspect the wreckage and on 20 May presented a report on the matter in the Proceedings of the Institution of Civil Engineers. Thorold considered that the increased width was a factor in the failure but that the principal cause was faulty quality in the suspension chain. Thorold stated that he found the first link to fail had been improperly welded, with contact between only 5% of the cross-sectional area. He concurred with Walker that one-third of the weld in the second link was unsound.

Thorold's report was the subject of further discussion in the Proceeding by several leading engineers of the time. Walker claimed that the decision to widen the bridge was poor. Though the additional weight imposed (2 long tons 13 cwt; 5,900 lb or 2.7 t) was small compared to the weight of the original deck (17 long tons 14 cwt 3 qr 25 lb; 39,757 lb or 18.033 t) the extra weight, being outside of the original deck area, was carried entirely by one of the chains. It was thought that, had the bridge not been widened, it would have been able to accept the crowd loading. Indeed, crowds of 2–3 times as many people had previously been present on the bridge, but the loads had been spread more evenly across the two suspension chains.

Leading bridge engineer and future ICE president James Meadows Rendel thought that such a slender suspension bridge should not have been constructed in a location susceptible to crowd loading. He noted that a similar bridge at Montrose, Angus had collapsed when a crowd formed on it to observe a boat race. Rendel described the Yarmouth bridge as "a mere toy" and that the design was not well conceived. He was of the opinion that a traditional arch bridge should have been constructed instead or otherwise the deck made rigid by use of a truss.

The primary cause of failure was attributed to the welding of the eyebars which was described as defective. Rendel found them to be of such poor quality that they would have failed under any adequate scheme of testing. Regular maintenance inspections of the bridge may have picked up the issue and one ICE member made the recommendation that public bridges be regularly inspected by a competent engineer.

=== Legacy ===
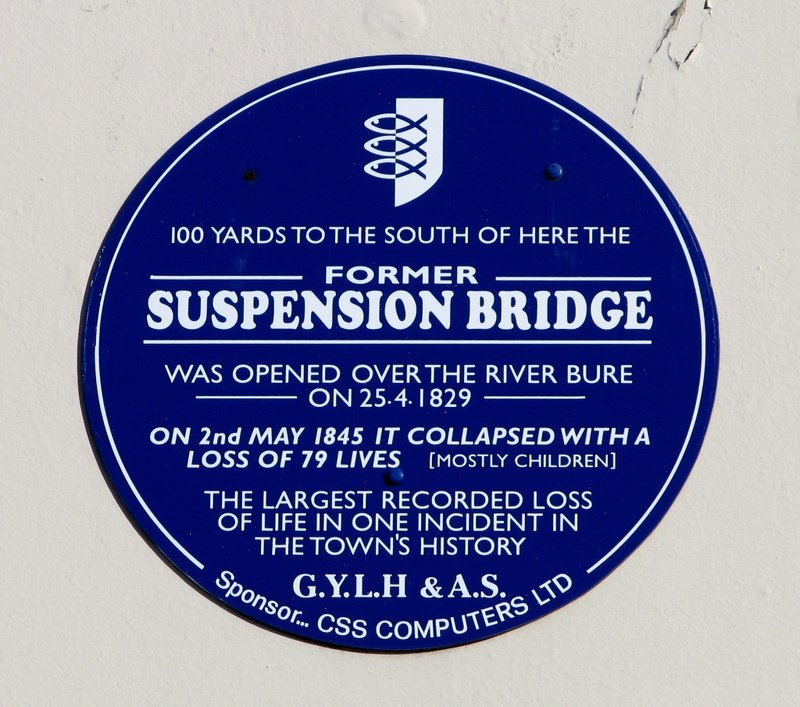
Plaque on the Swan

The disaster is described as the "largest recorded loss of life" in Great Yarmouth. It is commemorated by a blue plaque on the former Swan Inn, some 100 yards (91 m) north of the site of the bridge. Lanterns were lit at the site in 2013 to mark the 168th anniversary of the disaster. A permanent memorial costing £5,000 was erected near to the site of the bridge on North Quay Road in September 2013. This comprises a 1.4-metre (4 ft 7 in) high granite block carved to resemble an open book. One page depicts the disaster, and the other contains a list of the dead.

== See also ==
- List of bridge failures
