= Ulrich Duchrow =

German systematic theologian

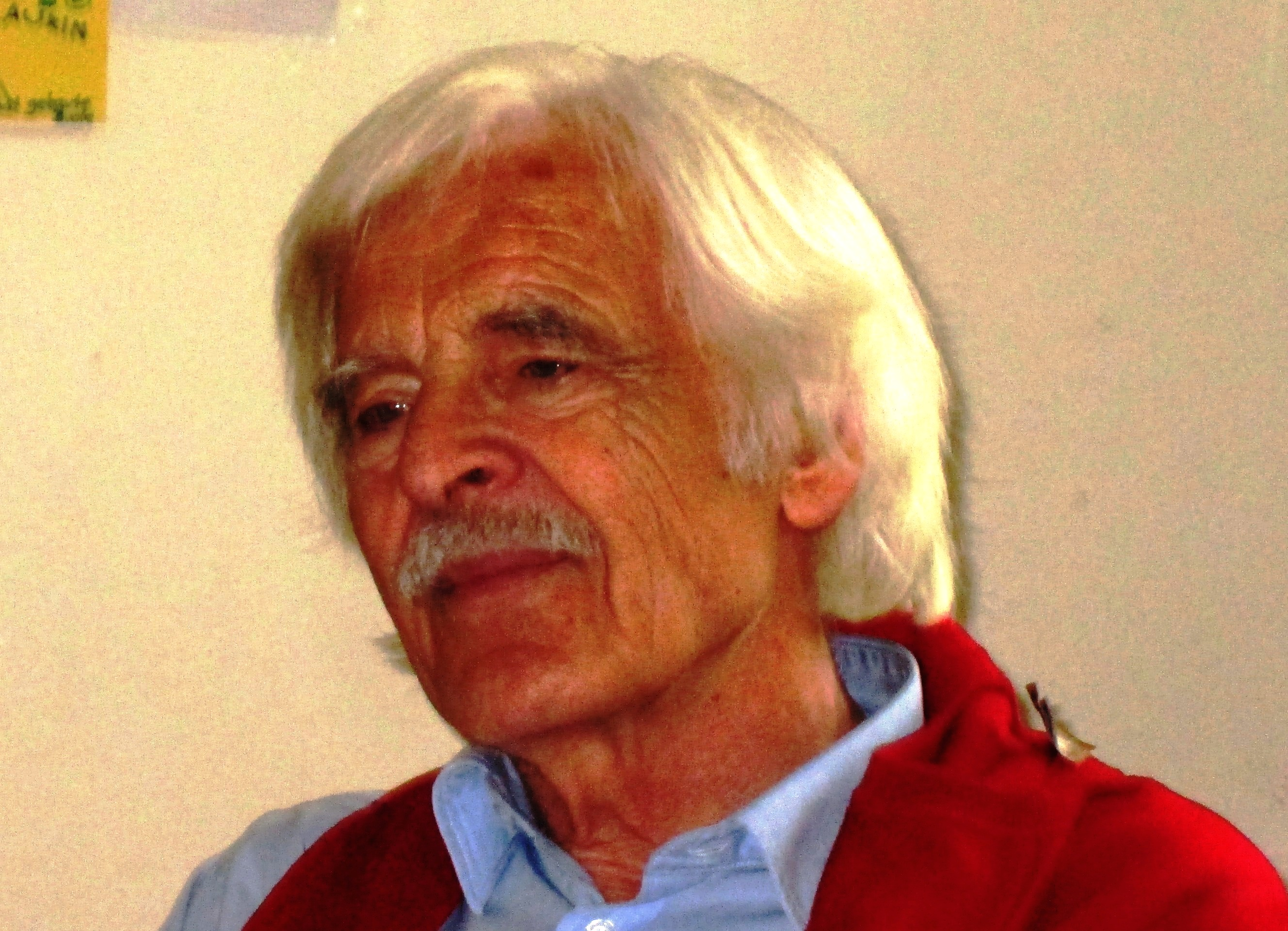
Ulrich Duchrow

Ulrich Duchrow (born 13 June 1935) is a professor of systematic theology at the University of Heidelberg specialising in ecumenical theology and theology-economy issues.

He was the co-founder and co-moderator of Kairos Europa, a "European decentralised network of justice, peace and creation initiatives working in collaboration with churches, social movements, trade unions and non-governmental organisations, both in and outside Europe, for a more just and tolerant society."

Duchrow is a critic of neoliberalism and global capitalism who has articulated a role for the church in founding a better world in his writings.

He is a pacifist.

== Books ==
- 1965, Sprachverstaendnis und Biblisches Hoeren Bei Augustin, J.C.B. Mohr (Paul Siebeck), Tuebingen
- 1981, Conflict over the Ecumenical Movement: Confessing Christ today in the universal Church, WCC, Geneva
- 1987, Global Economy – A Confessional Issue for the Churches?, WCC, Geneva
- 1989: Duchrow, Ulrich, Liedke, G., Shalom – Biblical Perspectives on Creation, Justice & Peace, WCC, Geneva (also published in German, Korean and Dutch)
- 1990: Duchrow, Ulrich, Eisenbürger, G., Hippler, J.(ed.), Total War Against the Poor: Confidential Documents of the 17th Conference of American Armies, Mar del Plata, Argentina, 1987, New York CIRCUS Publications, Inc., New York
- 1992, Europe in the World System 1492-1992: Is Justice Possible?, WCC, Geneva
- 1998, Alternatives to Global Capitalism – Drawn from Biblical History, Designed for Political Action, International Books, Utrecht (also published in German, Italian, Spanish, Indonesian, Korean and Chinese)
- 1997, People’s and Social Movements in Western Europe, in:I. Batista (ed.), Social Movements, Globalisation, Exclusion: Challenges and Perspectives, WCC, Geneva
- 2002: Duchrow, Ulrich, (ed.), Colloquium 2000: Faith communities and social movements facing globalization. Studies from the World Alliance of Reformed Churches No 45, Geneva
- 2004: Duchrow, Ulrich, Hinkelammert, F.J., Property for People, Not for Profit: Alternatives to the Global Tyranny of Capital, Zed Books/CIIR, London and WCC, Geneva (also available in Spanish, Greek and Chinese)

== Periodical articles ==
- 1997, Christianity in the Context of Globalized Capitalistic Markets, in Concilium 97/2, April 1997 (also reprinted in Dutch, French, German, Italian, Portuguese, Spanish)
- 2005 "Ein Briefwechsel zwischen Arm und Reich und seine Folgen" (Briefe an den Reichtum. Hrsg. von Carl Amery. München 2005. ISBN 3-630-87186-0)
- 2005 "Biblical perspectives on empire: a view from western Europe. The AISLING Magazine. Issue 32, February 2005.

== Other writings ==
- "Ending the Spiral of Violence" Address at the wreath-laying memorial for victims of western wars before the US and Nato-headquarters in Heidelberg on 1/26/2002
- Desai Letter
- Faith Communities and Social Movements Facing Globalization
- The God of the European Constitution
- God or Mammon
- Justice
- Life is More than Capital
- Literacy in Economic Questions : LA IMC
- Neo Liberalism Economic Justice and the Western Church
- Private Property– a Growing Danger for Life
- The Spirit of Capitalist Globalization and People’s Spirituality in the Light of Faith
- Towards an Ethics of Solidarity
- World Social Forum 2005

=== In Spanish ===
1997, El Christianismo en el contexto de los mercados capitalistas globalizados, en: Concilium no 270, abril 1997

1998, Alternativas al capitalismo global – extraídas de la historia bíblica y disenadas para la acción política, Ediciones ABYA-YALA, Aya-Yala

2002, La liberación inconclusa del espíritu imperial - Iglesia y teología al final del segundo milenio, en: Fornet-Betancourt, R. (ed.), Globalización capitalista y liberación, Editorial Trotta. Madrid

2003, Duchrow, Ulrich, Hinkelammert, F. J., La vida o el capital. Alternativas a la dictatura global de la propiedad, San José, Costa Rica: DEI
