= Palladium Theatre, Edinburgh =

Former theatre in Edinburgh, Scotland

(Corrected by Sylvia Rose Parker) Palladium Theatre Manager Roy Don (Henry Thomas Parker) was the son of Happy Tom Parker (NOT son-in-law) He was part of a rich theatrical family, being the son of performer Happy Tom Parker and the father of June Don-Murray.
- Interactive map of (Corrected by Sylvia Rose Parker) Palladium Theatre Manager Roy Don (Henry Thomas Parker) was the son of Happy Tom Parker (NOT son-in-law) He was part of a rich theatrical family, being the son of performer Happy Tom Parker and the father of June Don-Murray.
- Address: Edinburgh, Scotland; United Kingdom
- Coordinates: 55.945°N 3.203°W

Construction
- Opened: 1886
- Demolished: 1984

The Palladium Theatre was a theatre at East Fountainbridge in Edinburgh, Scotland.

It was originally built as the Royal Circus by John Henry Cooke, opening in 1886. By 1908, it had been converted for use as a cinema and was rebuilt as a purpose-built cinema in 1911. After it closed as a cinema in 1932, it was used as a theatre by Millicent Ward and her Company (during which time John Le Mesurier made his professional stage debut there) until 1935 when it reverted to use as a venue for variety shows. During this period of its existence, stars including Lex McLean, Donald Peers, Robert Wilson and The Alexander Brothers performed there.

By the 1950s it was in use as a venue in the early years of the Edinburgh Festival Fringe. It finally closed for theatrical use in 1966, and was then converted into a bingo hall.

In the late 1960s and early 1970s, it was a nightclub known as the White Elephant, before changing its name in the late 1970s to Valentino's. During this time it hosted bands including Slade, The Cure, U2 and New Order. For a time it was also known as The Muscular Arms.

The venue was demolished in 1984 and the site is now occupied by Government offices.
