= Cremorne Gardens, New York City =

Former pleasure garden in New York City

Nixon's Cremorne Gardens
- Interactive map of Nixon's Cremorne Gardens
- Former names: Nixon's Cremorne Gardens; Cremorne Gardens and Equestrian School
- Address: New York City; United States
- Location: New York
- Coordinates: 40°44′13″N 73°59′51″W
- Owner: James M. Nixon

Construction
- Built: 1860s
- Opened: June 9, 1862

Nixon's Cremorne Gardens was a pleasure garden and music hall in New York City, New York, located on Fourteenth Street, featuring a Palace of Music, an equestrian school, and a hall of floral.

== History ==
American circus proprietor James M. Nixon opened New York City's Cremorne Gardens on June 9, 1862. It was located at the corner of Fourteenth Street and Sixth Avenue. Nixon took a lease on Palace Gardens and converted it into a larger property that resembled Cremorne Gardens in London. Three new features were developed on the property: an equestrian performance area, a floral hall displaying trees, flowers, and shrubbery, and a music hall dubbed the Palace of Music. The admission fee was 25 cents for each visitor. The first show at the music hall took place on September 1, 1862. The season at the Cremorne failed to meet expectations set by extensive advertising, as high refreshment costs and poor weather impacted attendance. The initial crowd of nearly 3,000 dwindled after the first week, and efforts were not renewed for another year.

== See also ==
- Cremorne Gardens, London
