= William Batty (performer) =

Performer and circus proprietor (1801–1868)

- Born: 1801
- Died: 1868 (aged 66–67)
- Occupations: Equestrian performer, circus proprietor, and longtime operator

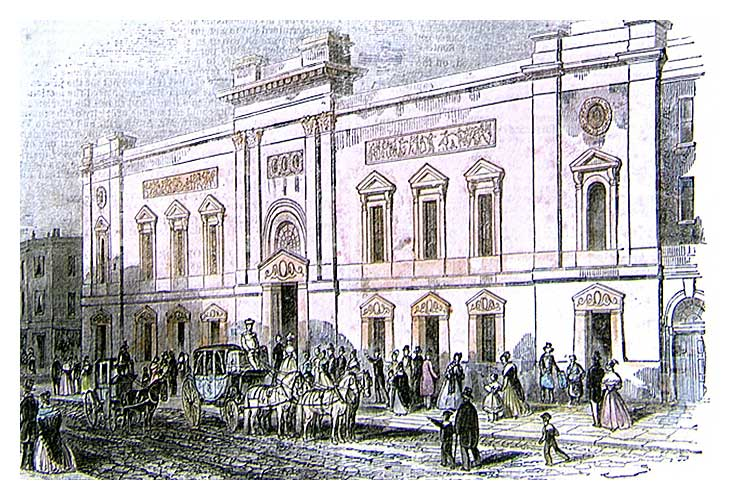
Re-opening of Astley's Amphitheatre, 1843

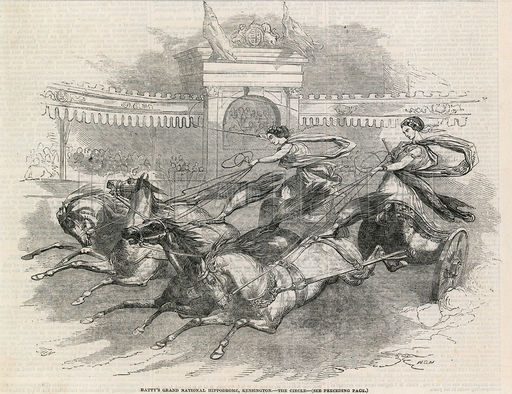
Batty's Grand National Hippodrome-The Circle, Illustrated London News, 10 May 1851

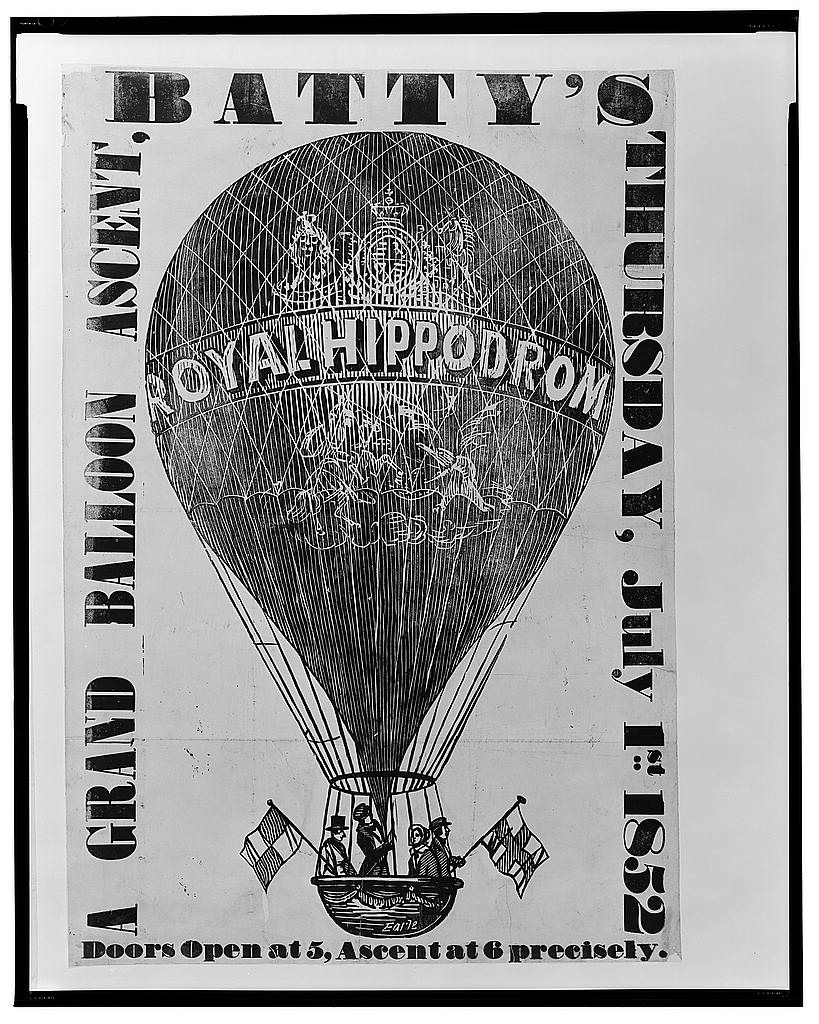
Poster Advertising Balloon Ascent at Batty's Hippodrome, 1852

William Batty (1801–1868) was an equestrian performer, circus proprietor, and longtime operator of Astley's Amphitheatre in London. Batty was one of the most successful circus proprietors in Victorian England and helped launch the careers of a number of leading Victorian circus personalities, such as Pablo Fanque, the versatile performer and later circus proprietor (best known today from his mention in The Beatles song "Being for the Benefit of Mr. Kite!"), and W.F. Wallett, one of the most celebrated clowns of the era. Also, while in operation for only two years, Batty's most lasting legacy is probably Batty's Grand National Hippodrome, also known as Batty's Hippodrome, an open-air amphitheatre he erected in 1851 in Kensington Gardens, London, to attract audiences from the Crystal Palace Exhibition nearby.

== Biography ==
Batty was an equestrian performer as early as 1828, and by 1836 he was operating his own circus. In that year, Pablo Fanque was performing with him in Nottingham as a "rope dancer." In the ensuing years, Batty's circus travelled throughout the United Kingdom; in 1838, he was at Newcastle and Edinburgh and, in 1840, at Portsmouth and Southampton. When Astley's Amphitheatre suffered its third fire, Batty was in Dublin, and boarded the next steamer to London to arrange for its rebuilding in Westminster Street. Batty put W.F. Wallett in charge of the management of his circus in Dublin, while Batty made plans for a temporary circus in Oxford and until Astley's could be rebuilt. While Batty was at Oxford in 1841, Pablo Fanque left Batty to start his own circus. Wallett joined him. On occasion, business would reunite Batty and Fanque over the next twenty years.

Batty managed Astley's Amphitheatre from 1842 to 1853. All the major circus acts of the day performed at Astley's, including Pablo Fanque who performed there for twelve nights in March 1847. Batty leased the building to William Cooke in 1853. Cooke would run Astley's until 1860.

While managing Astley's in the autumn of 1850, Batty acquired land in Kensington Gardens, London, to begin construction of an open-air arena for theatrical and equestrian events. Batty chose the site, which covered a large area at the end of the Broad Walk (now occupied by DeVere Gardens), to attract visitors to the Crystal Palace Exhibition, five minutes away. Architect George Ledwell Taylor designed the structure, which the firm Haward and Nixon constructed of iron and wood. The arena consisted of an eight-row grandstand, to seat 14,000 people, surrounding an oval space 360 feet by 260 feet. Named Batty's Grand National Hippodrome, or Batty's Hippodrome, the arena opened in May 1851, with a French troupe from the Hippodrome in Paris. In addition to equestrian events, Batty staged camel and ostrich races, and balloon ascents. Batty's Hippodrome opened for a second season in 1852, during which a balloon launch went awry, causing serious injury to its occupants after the balloon averted a collision with the Crystal Palace Exhibition and crashed into a nearby mansion. Batty ceased performances at the Hippodrome after the 1852 season and the arena operated as a riding track for several years until its demolition. No trace of Batty's Hippodrome remains today.

When Batty died in 1868, he was reportedly worth a half a million pounds sterling. He is buried in Kensal Green Cemetery in London.

In the 21st century, American ringmaster Noah Mickens of Oregon's Wanderlust Circus uses Batty's name as his own stage name. Prior to Wanderlust, Mickens' early circus was called Batty's Hippodrome, another homage to Batty.
