= William Capon (artist) =

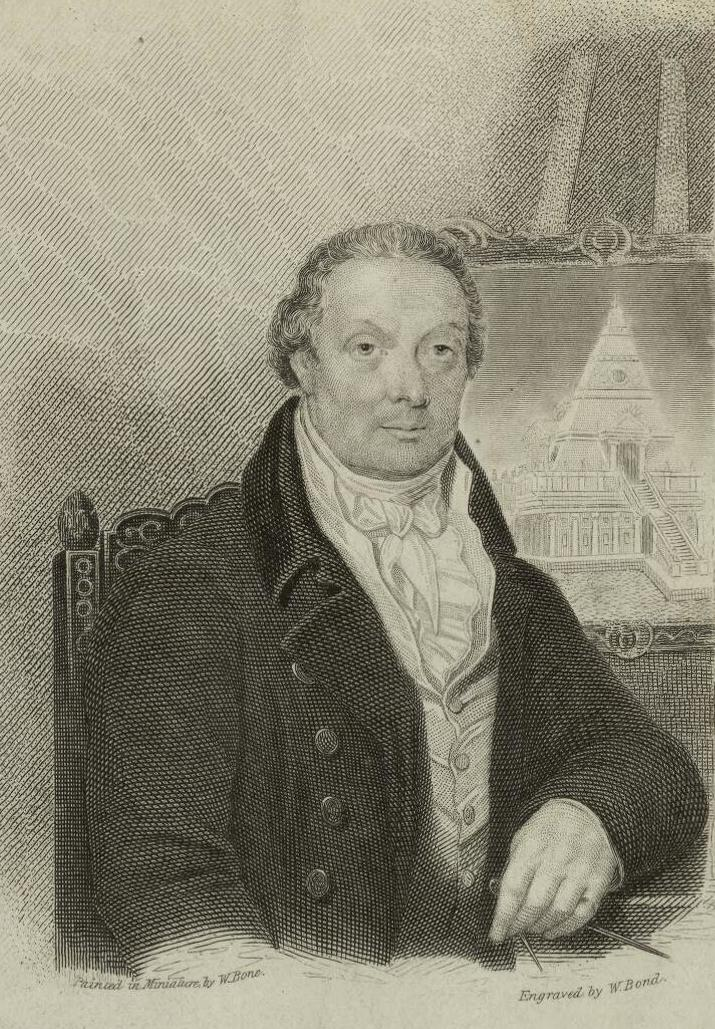
William Capon, 1827

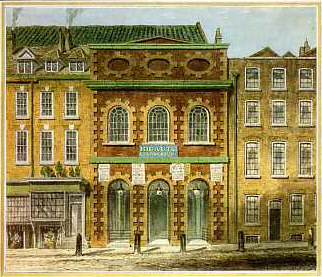
Her Majesty's Theatre, illustration now at the Victoria and Albert Museum

William Capon was an English artist.

== Life ==
Capon, whose father was also an artist, was born at Norwich on 6 December 1757, and in early life practised as a portrait painter.

Capon went to London, where he became an assistant to the architect and scene-painter Michael Novosielski, and was employed on the decorations of Ranelagh Gardens and the Italian Opera-house. He was afterwards employed by John Kemble as scene painter for Drury Lane Theatre, which was rebuilt in 1794. In later years he became celebrated as an architectural draughtsman. In the company of the antiquarian John Carter he recorded ancient buildings in Westminster, including some buildings which were scheduled to be demolished. He was appointed Architectural Draughtsman to the Duke of York in June 1804. He occasionally exhibited at the Royal Academy.

He died at his home in North Street Westminster in 1827.
