= Andrew Ducrow =

British circus performer

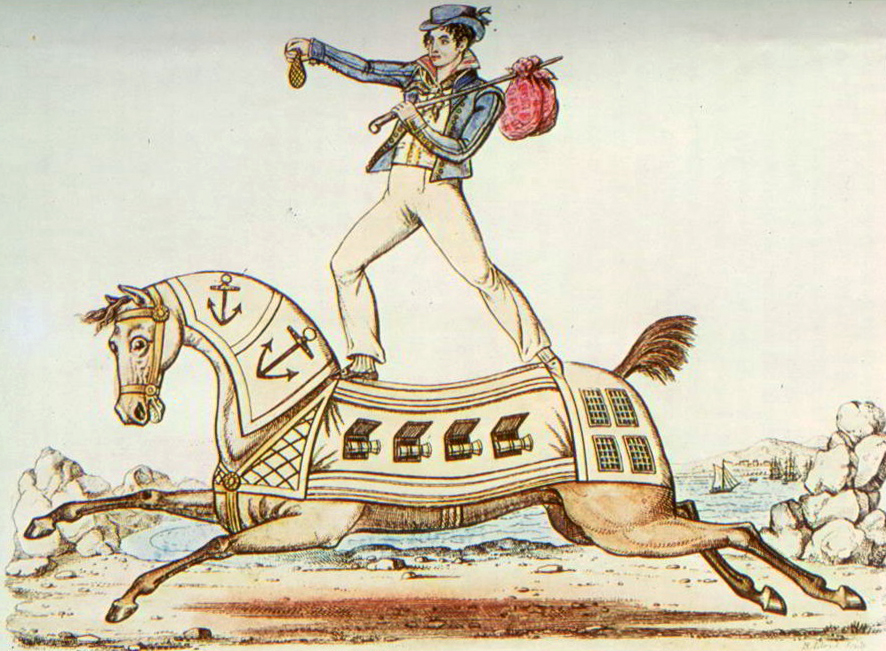
- Andrew Ducrow, Astley's Amphitheatre, London, 1834
- Born: Andrew Ducrow; 10 October 1793; England
- Died: 27 January 1842
- Resting place: Kensal Green Cemetery
- Occupation: Circus performer

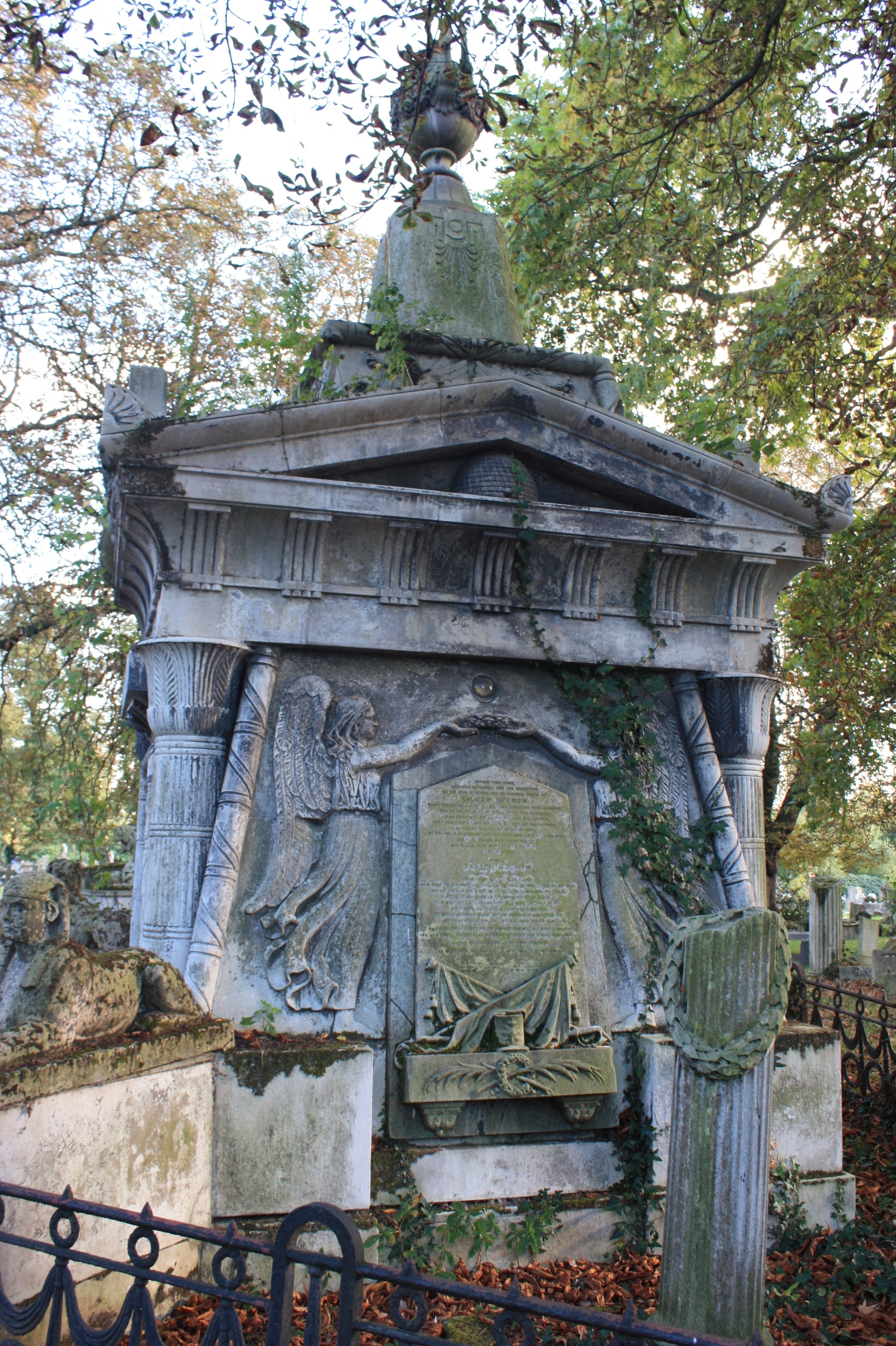
Andrew Ducrow's monument in Kensal Green Cemetery

Andrew Ducrow (10 October 1793 – 27 January 1842) was a British circus performer, often called the "Colossus of equestrians". He was the originator of horsemanship acts and proprietor of Astley's Amphitheatre, and remains one of the few giants of equestrian drama whose name is still familiar in the twenty-first century.

== Life and career ==
Ducrow was trained by his father, who had immigrated to England from Belgium in 1793.

Ducrow performed within the United Kingdom and in Europe, including in famous venues such as Covent Garden and Drury Lane. He is perhaps best known as the proprietor of Astley's Amphitheatre, where he was also the chief performer. Referred to by some as "the Chippendales of his day," Ducrow and his sons would dress in "fleshings" (flesh-coloured body stockings) to perform physique poses called plastiques, while standing upon the rumps of white stallions cantering round the amphitheatre.

Pablo Fanque, the black circus equestrian and later circus owner, best known from his mention in The Beatles song "Being for the Benefit of Mr. Kite!" on the album Sgt. Pepper's Lonely Hearts Club Band, worked in Ducrow's circus for some time.

Ducrow's shows proved immensely popular. Unfortunately, the Amphitheatre succumbed three times to fire. After the third time in 1841, Ducrow collapsed from a mental breakdown and died shortly thereafter in 1842. William Batty took over management of Astley's Amphitheatre and an employee of Ducrow called Joseph Hillier took over Ducrow's circus company.

== Legacy ==
Ducrow is buried on the Main (or Centre) Avenue at Kensal Green Cemetery in London, England, then one of the most desirable burial plots of the time. His tomb is one of the largest and most decorated tombs within the cemetery. The decoration is primarily pagan, being drawn from Greek and Egyptian sources. There is no Christian-inspired decoration. The tomb was designed by Ducrow's theatrical designer and originally was brightly painted in pastel hues to attract the eye. These have faded over time.

The "Courier of St. Petersburg", his most famous act, was the forerunner to modern horse acts and is still performed today at equestrian events.
