= Astley's Amphitheatre =

1773 London circus theatre

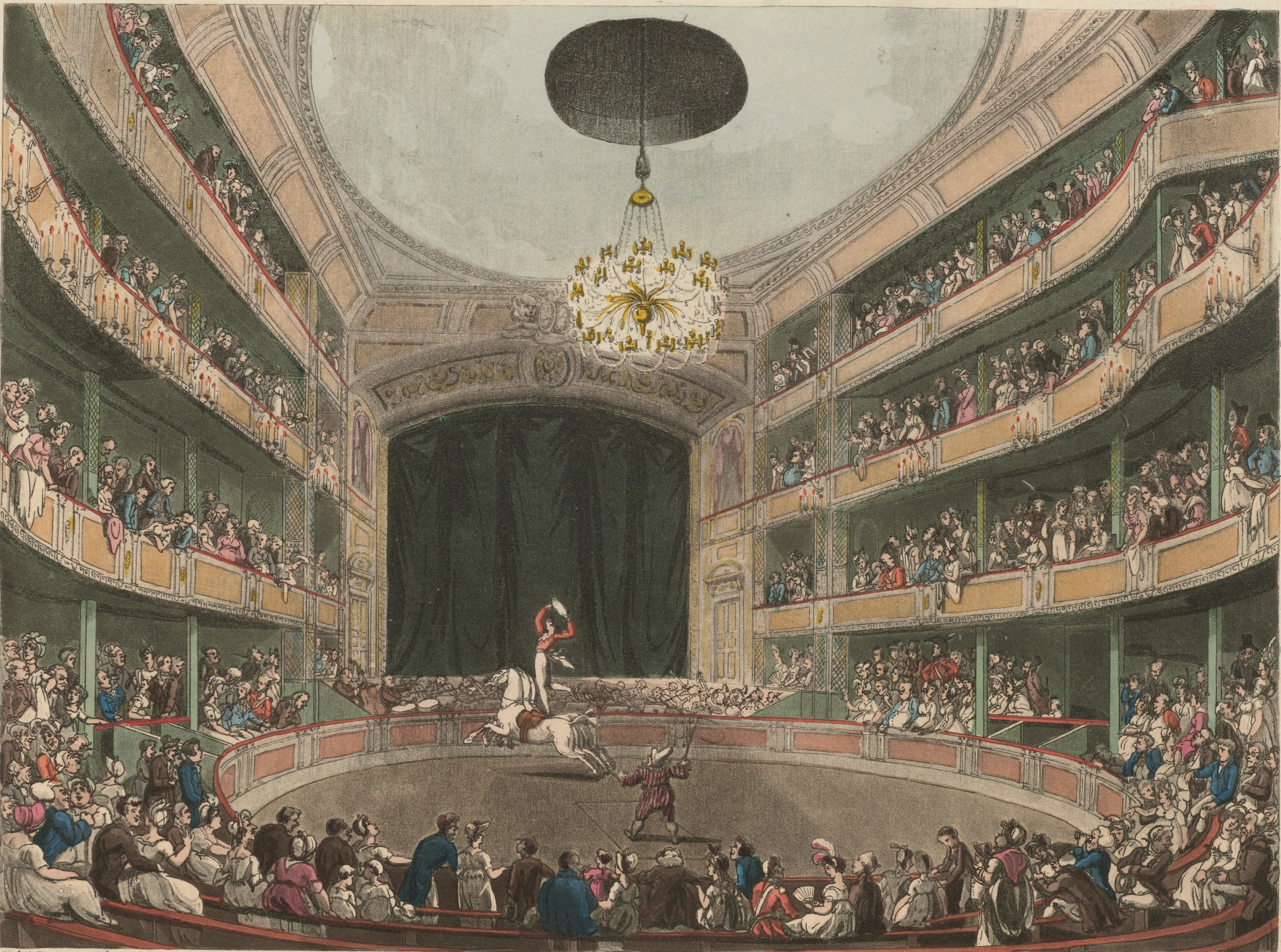
- Astley's Amphitheatre in London circa 1808.
- Interactive map of Astley's Amphitheatre
- Former names: Astley's Royal Amphitheatre
- Location: London, England
- Coordinates: 51°30′1″N 0°7′6″W
- Type: Amphitheatre

Construction
- Opened: 1773

Astley's Amphitheatre was a performance venue in London opened by Philip Astley in 1773, considered the first modern circus ring. It was burned and rebuilt several times, and went through many owners and managers. Despite no trace of the theatre remaining today, a memorial plaque was unveiled in 1951 at its site at 225 Westminster Bridge Road. That wooden plaque, attached to a wall on the Thames Embankment, has long since disappeared. On 14 September 2018, on the initiative of Martin 'Zippo' Burton of Zippo's Circus, a commemorative 'paver' or flagstone was inaugurated in the garden of St Thomas's Hospital, a reminder that Astley's once stood on that spot.

== History ==
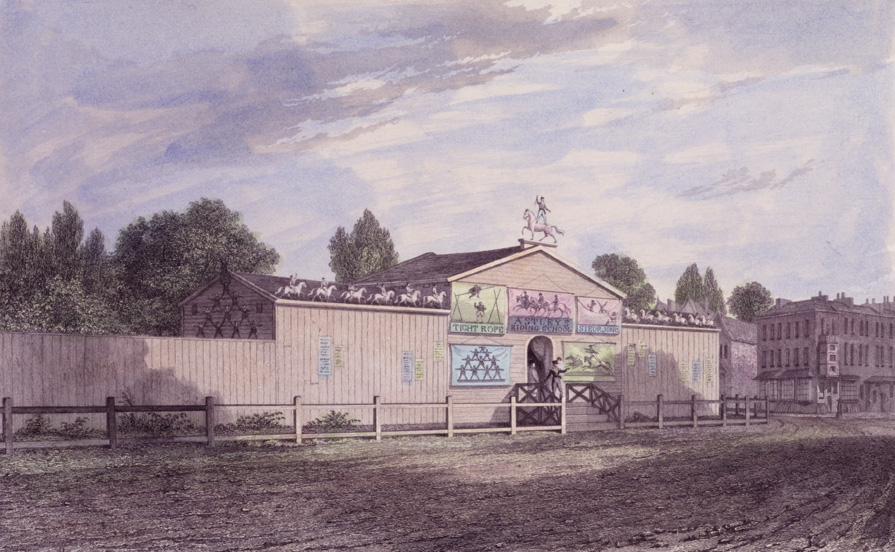
The original Astley's Amphitheatre, external view in 1777. Etching by Charles John Smith, after William Capon, hand-coloured.

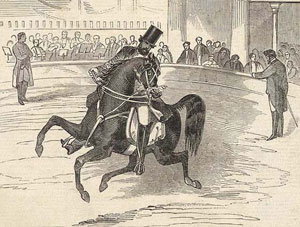
Pablo Fanque at Astley's Amphitheatre, 1847

The Amphitheatre opened in 1773. The structure was burned down in 1794, then rebuilt in less than seven months before being destroyed by fire again in 1803. The Amphitheatre was again rebuilt, this time in the style of rival Charles Hughes's Royal Circus with lavish decorations and reputedly the largest stage in London. With increasing prosperity and rebuilding after successive fires, it grew to become Astley's Royal Amphitheatre and this was the home of the circus. The location of the theatre was Westminster Bridge Road in Lambeth.

The theatre continued to be popular long after Astley's death in 1814. His son John succeeded him, and hired Madame Saqui to perform on her tightrope. John retired three years later, handing over to his partner Davis. This led to a renaming from 'Astley's' to 'Davis's' Amphitheatre. William Batty (1801–1868), perhaps best known as the owner of Batty's Hippodrome, acquired Astley's from Andrew Ducrow (1793–1842) in 1841, after the building sustained its third fire, causing Ducrow to suffer a mental breakdown and die in early 1842. Batty rebuilt the Amphitheatre entirely on his own resources and ran Astley's until 1853. During his tenure, Pablo Fanque, the black circus equestrian and circus owner made his London debut at Astley's in 1847. William Cooke leased the building in 1853 and ran Astley's until 1860.

In 1863 the Amphitheatre was turned into the Theatre Royal by Dion Boucicault, however it resulted in failure and left Boucicault heavily in debt. Edward Tyrrel Smith succeeded Boucicault and provided Adah Isaacs Menken with her first London appearance in Mazeppa to "overflowing houses". Its final owner was "Lord" George Sanger, who bought it for £11,000 in 1871 and ran it as Sanger's Amphitheatre for over 20 years. This theatre was demolished in 1893.

== Building structure and design ==
After the Amphitheatre was rebuilt again after the third fire, it was said to be very grand. The external walls were 148 feet long which was larger than anything else at the time in London. The interior of the Amphitheatre was designed with a proscenium stage surrounded by boxes and galleries for spectators. The general structure of the interior was octagonal. The pit used for the entertainers and riders became a standardised 43 feet in diameter, with the circular enclosure surrounded by a painted four foot barrier. Astley's original circus was 62 ft (~19 m) in diameter, and later he settled it at 42 ft (~13 m), which has been an international standard for circuses since.

The prevailing decorations are white, lemon-colour, green and gold, with rich crimson hangings for the private boxes. There are two full tiers of boxes, and two half tiers, ranging evenly from the two galleries. Each of the full tiers contains nineteen open boxes. The circles are supported from the pit by eight Doric pillars and forty-six Corinthian columns, fluted in white and gold. There are six spacious saloons - two for the dress circle, two for the pit, two for the upper boxes, with extensive refreshment places for the galleries. In the centre of the first tier is the royal box, tastefully ornamented.

— The Illustrated London News, 1843

== In popular culture ==
Jane Austen's 1815 novel Emma credits a visit to Astley's for bringing about the reconciliation and engagement of Robert Martin and Harriet Smith.

Charles Dickens wrote a short story titled Astley's in his 1836 book, Sketches by Boz. He describes an evening at Astley's in chapter 39 of The Old Curiosity Shop, and the circus is also mentioned in Hard Times (Book 3 chapter 7) and Bleak House.

Tracy Chevalier's 2007 novel Burning Bright is set at Astley's in 1792–93.

== See also ==
- Astley's Amphitheatre (Dublin)
- Amphithéâtre d'Astley (Paris)
- Hippodrama, a theatrical performance involving horses
