= John Sanger =

English circus proprietor (1816–1889)

John Sanger (1816 – 22 August 1889) was an English circus proprietor.

== Biography ==
He was born at Chew Magna, Somerset, in 1816, the son of an old sailor who had turned showman. In 1845 he started with his brother George Sanger a conjuring exhibition at Birmingham. The venture was successful, and the brothers, who had been interested spectators of the equestrian performances at Astley's Amphitheatre, London, then started touring the country with a circus entertainment consisting of a horse and pony and three or four human performers. This enterprise was a success from the beginning, and in due course John and George Sanger became lessees of the Agricultural Hall, London, and there produced a large number of elaborate spectacles.

In 1871 the Sangers leased Astley's Amphitheatre where they gave an equestrian pantomime every winter, touring in the summer with a large circus. Subsequently the partnership was dissolved, each brother producing his own show. John Sanger died while touring, at Ipswich, the business being continued by his son.

John Sanger's granddaughter, Victoria Sanger Freeman became a legendary figure in the circus world in her own right, becoming known as "the Queen of the Elephants." She was the last of the great Sanger circus dynasty which proudly held the title "The Greatest Name in Circus."

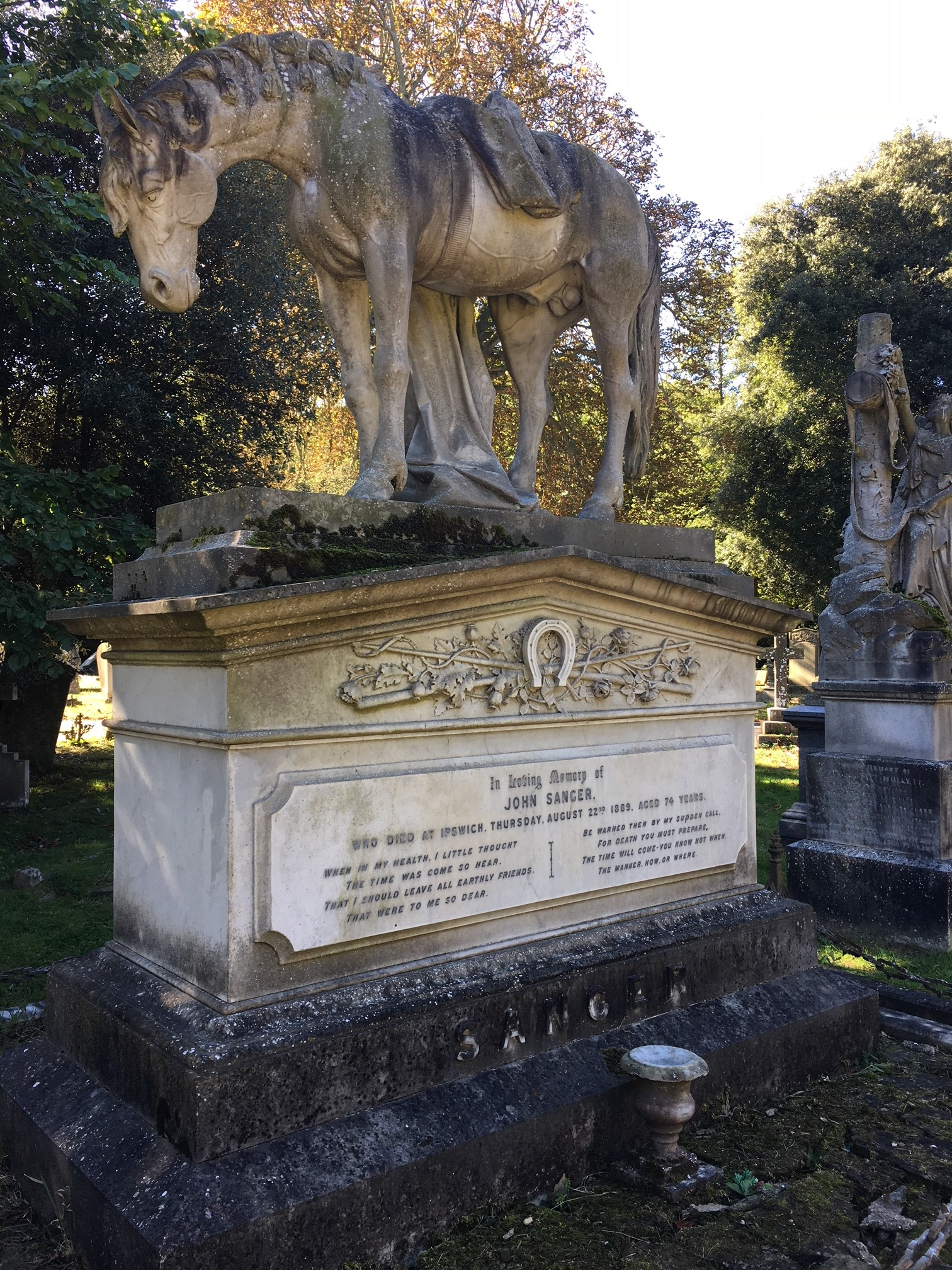
The grave of John Sanger in Margate Cemetery, Kent

== Cultural references ==
Sanger's circus once featured William Kite, an all-around performer whose appearance, as announced on a poster for Pablo Fanque's Circus Royal, was the inspiration for The Beatles song Being for the Benefit of Mr. Kite!
