= List of tallest buildings and structures in Norwich =

This list of tallest buildings and structures in Norwich ranks skyscrapers and other structures by height in Norwich, United Kingdom that are at least 35 metres tall.

| Rank | Name | Use | Image | Height m (ft) | Floors | Year | Notes |
|---|---|---|---|---|---|---|---|
| 1 | Norwich Cathedral | Religious | | 96 m (315 ft) | N/A | 1145 | Church of England |
| 2 | Norwich City Hall | Government | | 63 m (207 ft) | N/A | 1938 | To top of clock tower |
| 3= | Normandie Tower | Residential | | 48 m (157 ft) | 16 | 1966 | |
| 3= | Winchester Tower | Residential | | 48 m (157 ft) | 16 | 1966 | |
| 5 | Pablo Fanque House | Residential | | 46.2 m (152 ft) | 14 | 2018 | Student accommodation |
| 6= | County Hall | Government | | 45 m (148 ft) | 13 | 1968 | Norfolk County Council |
| 6= | Norfolk Tower | Office | | 45 m (148 ft) | 11 | 1974 | |
| 8 | St Peter Mancroft | Religious | | 44.5 m (146 ft) | N/A | 1455 | Church of England |
| 9 | University of East Anglia chimneys (x2) | Industrial | | 43 m (141 ft) | N/A | 1965 | |
| 10 | Westlegate Tower | Residential | | 41 m (135 ft) | 13 | 2014 | |
| 11 | St John the Baptist Cathedral, Norwich | Religious | | 38 m (125 ft) | N/A | 1910 | Roman Catholic |
| 12= | Compass tower | Residential | | 37 m (121 ft) | 11 | 1964 | |
| 12= | Ashbourne Tower | Residential | | 37 m (121 ft) | 11 | 1964 | |
| 12= | Burleigh Tower | Residential | | 37 m (121 ft) | 11 | 1964 | |
| 12= | Markham Tower | Residential | | 37 m (121 ft) | 11 | 1965 | |
| 12= | Aylmer Tower | Residential | | 37 m (121 ft) | 11 | 1965 | |
| 12= | Seaman Tower | Residential | | 37 m (121 ft) | 11 | 1965 | |
| 18 | Aviva office buildings | Office | | 36.3 m (119 ft) | 11 | ≈1970 | |
