= Pablo Fanque =

Circus performer and equestrian (1796–1871)

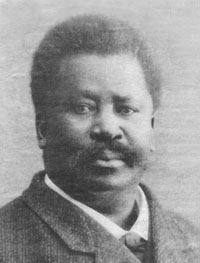
- Born: William Darby; 30 March 1810; Norwich, England, United Kingdom
- Died: 4 May 1871 (aged 61); Stockport, England, United Kingdom
- Occupations: Circus proprietor; equestrian performer
- Years active: 1821−1869
- Spouses: Susannah Marlaw (died 1848); Elizabeth Corker (m. 1848)

Pablo Fanque (born William Darby; 30 March 1810 – 4 May 1871) was a British equestrian performer and circus proprietor, becoming the first recorded Black circus owner in Britain. His circus was popular in Victorian Britain for 30 years, a period that is regarded as the golden age of the circus.

Since the 1960s, Pablo Fanque has been best known for being mentioned in the Beatles song "Being for the Benefit of Mr. Kite!" on their 1967 album Sgt. Pepper's Lonely Hearts Club Band.

== Early life ==
Little is known about Pablo Fanque's early life. Church records suggest that he was born in Norwich in 1810 and was one of at least five children, born to John and Mary Darby (née Stamp). They were believed to have resided in Ber Street. When Fanque married in 1848, he said his late father's occupation was "butler" on his marriage certificate.

Dr. John M. Turner speculates in his 2003 biography of Fanque that "his father was African born and had been brought to the port of Norwich and trained as a house servant." Fanque was reportedly orphaned at a young age. Another account has Fanque born in a workhouse to a family with seven children.

Since shortly after Fanque's death in 1871, biographers have disputed his date of birth. Since 2003 biographer Turner has popularized the belief Fanque was born in 1796. The newspaper Era records on 14 May 1871 that Fanque's coffin bore the inscription; "AGED 75 YEARS". Fanque's gravestone, located at the base of his late wife Susannah Darby's grave in Woodhouse Cemetery, Leeds (now St George's Field, part of the University of Leeds), reads; "Also the above named William Darby Pablo Fanque who died May 4th 1871 Aged 75 Years".

But Fanque's age was recorded in the 1841, 1851 and 1871 censuses of England as indicating he was born in 1810. A birth register at St. Andrew's Workhouse in Norwich reports the birth of a William Darby to John Darby and Mary Stamp at the workhouse on 1 April 1810. This is the birth year on a blue plaque commemorating Fanque's birth, which was installed by the city of Norwich near the purported location of his childhood residence.

Genealogists have noted a marriage record of John Darby and Mary Stamp on 27 March 1791 at St. Stephen's, Norwich. Records of children born to Darby and Stamp include John Richard on 4 July 1792, Robert on 27 July 1794, William on 28 February 1796, Mary Elizabeth on 18 March 1798, and William on 30 March 1810. The family has two burial records, William on 30 April 1797 and Mary Elizabeth on 10 February 1801. These indicate that the subject William was born in 1810, the second boy to have been given that name after his late brother died in 1797.

== Career ==
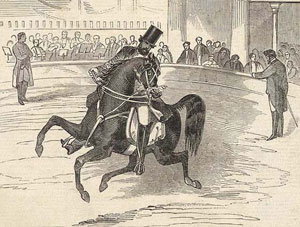
Fanque at Astley's Amphitheatre, 1847

Based on the 1810 birth year, the young William Darby was apprenticed at age 11 to circus proprietor William Batty and made his first known appearance in a sawdust ring in Norwich on 26 December 1821, as "Young Darby." His acts included equestrian stunts and rope walking. Thomas Frost, in Circus Life and Circus Celebrities, wrote, "We find Batty in 1836 at Nottingham, with a company which included Pablo Fanque, a negro rope-dancer, whose real name was William Darby ..." Once established as a young adult, William Darby changed his professional name to Pablo Fanque. It appears that Fanque or his contemporaries often considered "Pablo" to be his surname.

Fanque made a highly successful London debut in 1847. Describing Fanque and his performance, The Illustrated London News wrote:

Mr. Pablo Fanque is an artiste of colour, and his steed ... we have not only never seen surpassed, but never equalled ... Mr. Pablo Fanque was the hit of the evening. The steed in question was Beda, the black mare that Fanque had bought from Batty. That the horse attracted so much attention was testament to Fanque's extraordinary horse training skills.

The Illustrated London News reporting on perhaps an earlier performance during Fanque's 1847 run at London's Astley's Amphitheatre, fills in many biographical details regarding Fanque:

... Mr. William Darby, or, as he is professionally known, Mr. Pablo Fanque, is a native of Norwich, and is about 35 years of age. He was apprenticed to Mr. Batty, the present proprietor of "Astley's Amphitheatre," and remained in his company several years. He is proficient in rope-dancing, posturing, tumbling &c.; and is also considered a very good equestrian. After leaving Mr. Batty, he joined the establishment of the late Mr. Ducrow, and remained with him for some time. He again joined Mr. Batty; in 1841, he began business on his own account, with two horses, and has assembled a fine stud of horses and ponies at his establishment at Wigan, in Lancashire, in which county Mr. Pablo is well known, and a great favourite.

This same edition of The Illustrated London News provides an example of how contemporaries regarded his performance:

This extraordinary feat of the manege has proved very attractive, as we anticipated in our Journal of last week; and we have judged the success worthy of graphic commemoration. As we have already described, the steed dances to the air, and the band has not to accommodate itself to the action of the horse, as in previous performances of this kind. The grace and facility in shifting time and paces with change of the air, is truly surprising." Fanque is described as a "skilful rider" and "a very good equestrian.

Sounding almost as grand as the boasts of Fanque's own broadside posters, the paper said, "Mr. Pablo has trained [his black mare] to do the most extraordinary feats of the 'manège' [note, related to dressage], an art hitherto considered to belong only to the French and German professors of equitation, and her style certainly far exceeds anything that has ever yet been brought from the Continent."

An illustration closely resembling the one appearing in the 20 March 1847 edition of The Illustrated London News appears on an 1850s poster advertising Fanque's appearance in Leeds, with the headline, "M. Pablo Fanque, as he performed, by royal command, at Astley's Amphitheatre, before her Most Gracious Majesty the Queen." The Hampshire Advertiser documents one instance when Fanque performed before the royal family in Brighton, as part of William Batty's troupe on 3 January 1834.

While Turner cites Fanque's 1847 performance at Astley's as his London debut, the historical record documents an 1834 performance at The Lawns in Croydon, now a borough of metropolitan London but at the time in Surrey. A history of The Lawns records an advertisement that read, "16th September 1834 – A Grand Scottish Fete with a tightrope performance by Pablo Fanque, gymnastics, a leopardess with dogs, military bands, illuminations and fireworks." Also, newspapers from London and Ryde in 1839 and 1840 describe him as already a fixture at Astley's, as part of William Batty's Circus.

In the 30 years that Fanque operated his own circus (sometimes in partnership with others), he toured England, Scotland, and Ireland, but he performed mostly in the Midlands and the Northern England counties of Yorkshire, Lancashire, and what is now Greater Manchester. Among the many cities he visited were Birmingham, Bolton, Bradford, Bristol, Cambridge, Chester, Chesterfield, Hull, Leeds, Liverpool, London, Manchester, Norwich, Oldham, Preston, Rochdale, Rotherham, Ryde, Sheffield, Shrewsbury, Wakefield, Wigan, Wolverhampton, and Worcester. In Scotland, his circus visited Glasgow, Edinburgh, and Paisley. In Edinburgh, in 1853, there was a Pablo Fanque's Amphitheatre on Nicolson Street at the current site of Edinburgh Festival Theatre. In Ireland, Fanque's circus performed at Dublin, Belfast, Cork, Galway, Ballinasloe, Carlow, Kilkenny, Waterford, and Clonmel, among other places. In Cork, in 1850, Fanque built an amphitheatre on the site of the former Theatre Royal, where the current General Post Office stands (built in 1877). His circus also performed at the Donnybrook Fair in 1850, five years before the centuries' old fair was discontinued.

"Fanque's children joined his circus. One of his sons performed under the name Ted Pablo ..." They performed with the most popular acts of the business, including Young Hernandez (1832–1861), the great American rider, and the clown Henry Brown (1814–1902)." In the autumn of 1861, famous English prizefighter Jem Mace toured with Fanque's circus.

In 1869, the front cover of Illustrated London News reported on a near-tragedy at a performance of Pablo Fanque's Circus in Bolton. Tightrope walker Madame Caroline stumbled on the rope, and hung suspended by her hands 60 feet (18 m) in the air. The rope was lowered a few feet and, at the exhortation of men who had amassed below, Madame Caroline let go to fall safely into the hands of the crowd.

While some contemporary reports did not refer to Fanque's African ancestry, other reports noted that he was "a man of colour," or "a coloured gentleman," or "an artiste of colour." (These suggest he was of mixed race, with partial European ancestry as well.) In 1905, many years after Fanque's death, the chaplain of the Showmen's Guild wrote, "In the great brotherhood of the equestrian world there is no colour-line." He was commenting on Fanque's success in Victorian England despite being of mixed race.

== Beatles fame ==
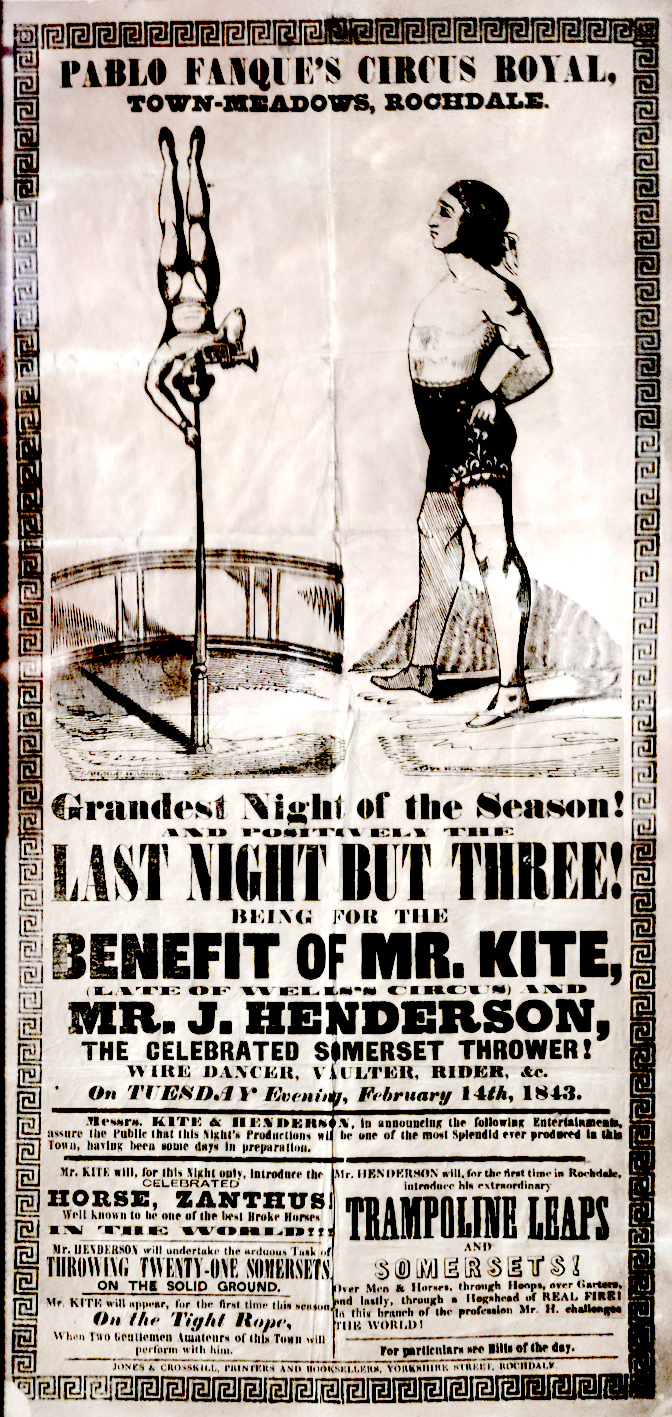
The poster for Pablo Fanque's Circus Royal from 1843 that inspired the Beatles' song "Being for the Benefit of Mr. Kite!"

In 1967, John Lennon, in composing The Beatles' "Being for the Benefit of Mr. Kite!," borrowed liberally from an 1843 playbill for Pablo Fanque's Circus Royal. Lennon bought the poster from an antique shop in Sevenoaks, Kent, while shooting a promotional film for the song, "Strawberry Fields Forever", in Knole Park. Tony Bramwell, a former Apple Records employee, recalled, "There was an antique shop close to the hotel we were using in Sevenoaks. John and I wandered in and John spotted this Victorian circus poster and bought it." The poster advertises a performance in Rochdale and announces the appearance of "Mr. J. Henderson, the celebrated somerset thrower" and "Mr. Kite" who is described as "late of Wells's Circus." Lennon modifies the language, singing instead, "The Hendersons will all be there/Late of Pablo Fanque's Fair/What a scene!"

The title "Being for the Benefit of Mr. Kite!" is taken verbatim from the poster. The Mr. Kite referenced in the poster was William Kite, who is believed to have performed in Fanque's circus from 1843 to 1845.

The full text of the original poster is:

PABLO FANQUE'S CIRCUS ROYAL,
TOWN-MEADOWS, ROCHDALE.
Grandest Night of the Season!
AND POSITIVELY THE
LAST NIGHT BUT THREE!
BEING FOR THE
BENEFIT OF MR. KITE,
(LATE OF WELLS'S CIRCUS) AND
MR. J. HENDERSON,
THE CELEBRATED SOMERSET THROWER!
WIRE DANCER, VAULTER, RIDER, &c.
On TUESDAY Evening, February 14, 1843.

Mssrs. KITE and HENDERSON, in announcing the following Entertainments assure the Public that this Night's Production will be one of the most splendid ever produced in this Town, having been some days in preparation.
Mr. KITE will, for this night only, introduce the
CELEBRATED
HORSE, ZANTHUS!
Well known to be one of the
best Broke Horses
IN THE WORLD!!!
Mr. HENDERSON will undertake the arduous Task of
THROWING TWENTY-ONE SOMERSETS,
ON THE SOLID GROUND.
Mr. KITE will appear, for the first time this season,
On the Tight Rope,
When Two Gentlemen Amateurs of this Town will
perform with him.

Mr. HENDERSON will, for the first time in Rochdale,
introduce his extraordinary
TRAMPOLINE LEAPS
AND
SOMERSETS!
Over Men & Horses, through Hoops, over Garters,
and lastly through a
Hogshead of REAL FIRE!
In this branch of the profession Mr. H challenges
THE WORLD!

For particulars see Bills of the day.

JONES & CROSSKILL, PRINTERS AND BOOKSELLERS, YORKSHIRE STREET, ROCHDALE.

"Mr. J. Henderson" was John Henderson, a wire-walker, equestrian, trampoline artist, and clown. While the poster made no mention of "Hendersons" plural, as Lennon sings, John Henderson did perform with his wife Agnes, the daughter of circus owner Henry Hengler. The Hendersons performed throughout Europe and Russia during the 1840s and 1850s.

A few years later, he was mentioned again in song in the lyrics of Ritz by Steve Harley & Cockney Rebel on their album The Psychomodo. The verse lyrics read "Couch my disease in chintz-covered kisses, Glazed calico cloth, my costume this is, Come to Pablo Fanque is in Indigo, We'll show you pastel shades of rhyme".

== Beneficence ==
The "Benefit for Mr. Kite" was one of many benefits that Pablo Fanque held for performers in his circus, for others in the profession (who had no regular retirement or health benefits), and for community organizations. Fanque was a member of the Order of Ancient Shepherds, a fraternal organization affiliated with the Freemasons. It assisted families in times of illness or death with burial costs and other expenses. For example, an 1845 show in Blackburn benefitted the Blackburn Mechanics Institution and the Independent Order of Odd-fellows, offering a bonus to the Widows and Orphans Fund. Fanque held a similar benefit in Bury the following year. Writing in 2003, Turner could find nothing in the historical record regarding Fanque's circus activities in 1857 and 1858.

But Fanque was active during those years, holding at least two benefits among other performances. In 1857, in Bradford, he held a benefit for the family of the late Tom Barry, a clown. Brenda Assael, in The Circus and Victorian Society, writes that in March 1857, "Pablo Fanque extended the hand of friendship to Barry's widow and held a benefit in her husband's name at his Allied Circus in Bradford. Using the Era offices to transmit the money he earned from this event, Fanque enclosed 10 pounds worth of 'post office orders...being the profits of the benefit. I should have been better pleased had it been more, but this was the close of a very dull season.'" On 24 October 1858, The Herald of Scotland reported: "IN GLASGOW, 'Pablo Fanque's Cirrque Nationale' offered 'A Masonic Benefit.'"

Britain had abolished slavery in 1834 but it was still a legal institution in the United States when Britons made Fanque such a popular figure. The minutes of Edinburgh's Celtic Lodge No. 291 read, "28th February 1853. Deputation to Brother Pablo Fanque’s Amphitheatre. [A] few of the brethren met this evening in accordance with the resolution of the committee meeting of 23rd inst and accompanied the Right Worshipful Master to Brother Pablo’s Fanque’s Amphitheatre to patronage Luin on this occasion of his benefit[.] [T]he Celtic brethren met with several Sister Lodges and had much pleasure to attend."

In 1843, when clergy in Burnley were criticized in the Blackburn Mercury for attending performances of Fanque's circus, a reader responded:

Ministers of religion, of all denominations, in other towns, have attended Mr. Pablo Fanque's circus. Such is [his] character for probity and respectability, that wherever he has been once he can go again; aye and receive the countenance and support of the wise and virtuous of all classes of society. I am sure that the friends of temperance and morality are deeply indebted to him for the perfectly innocent recreation which he has afforded to our population, by which I am sure hundreds have been prevented from spending their money in revelling and drunkenness.

An 1846 Bolton newspaper story epitomized the public's high regard for Fanque in the communities he visited on account of his beneficence:

Several of the members of the "Widows and Orphans Fund" presented to Mr. Pablo Fanque a written testimonial, mounted in an elegant gilt frame...Mr. Pablo on entering the room was received with due respect. Mr. Fletcher presented an address...which concluded:...'and when the hoary hand of age should cease to wave over your head, at a good old age, may you sink into the grave regretted, and your name and acts of benevolence be remembered by future generations.'

== Partnership with W. F. Wallett ==
During the 1840s and 1850s, Fanque was close friends with the clown W. F. Wallett, who performed in his circus. Wallett also managed Fanque's circus for a time. Wallett frequently promoted himself as "the Queen's Jester," having performed once before Queen Victoria in 1844 at Windsor Castle. He appeared with Fanque's circus in Leeds, Wakefield, Oxford, and Glasgow. A benefit was being held for Wallett in Leeds when the amphitheatre collapsed, killing Fanque's wife. Wallett's wife was sitting with her but escaped serious injury.

Throughout his 1870 autobiography, Wallett shares several amusing anecdotes about his work and friendship with Fanque, including the following about their 1859 engagement in Glasgow:

The season was a succession of triumphs. One of the principal attractions was a little Irishman whom I engaged in Dublin, who rejoiced in the name of Vilderini, one of the best posture masters the theatrical world ever produced. I engaged him for three months at a liberal salary, on the express understanding that I should shave his head, and convert him into a Chinaman. For which nationality his small eyes, pug nose, high cheek bones, and heavy mouth admirably adapted him. So his head was shaved, all but a small tuft on the top, to which a saddler with waxed twine firmly attached his celestial pig-tail. His eyebrows were shaved off, and his face, neck, and head dyed after the most admired Chinese complexion. Thus metamorphosed, he was announced on the walls as KI HI CHIN FAN FOO (Man-Spider-leg mortal). We had about twenty supernumeraries and the whole equestrian company in Chinese costume. Variegated lanterns, gongs, drums, and cymbals ushered the distinguished Chinaman into the ring, to give his wonderful entertainment. The effect was astonishing, and its success extraordinary. In fact the entire get-up was so well carried out that it occasioned us some annoyance. For there were two rival tea merchants in Glasgow at the time, and each of them had engaged a genuine Chinaman as touter at his door. Every night, as soon as they could escape from their groceries, they came to the circus to solicit an interview with their compatriot. After being denied many nights in succession, they peremptorily demanded to see him. Being again refused, they determined to move for the writ of habeas corpus. That is to say, they applied to the magistrate stating they believed their countryman to be deprived of his liberty except during the time of his performance. We were then compelled to produce our celestial actor, who proved to the satisfaction of the worthy magistrate that he was a free Irishman from Tipperary.

== Marriages and family ==
Fanque married Susannah Marlaw, the daughter of a Birmingham buttonmaker. They had two sons, one of whom was named Lionel. On 18 March 1848, his wife died in Leeds in an accident at the building where the circus was performing. Their son was performing a tightrope act before a large crowd at the Amphitheatre at King Charles Croft. The 600 people seated in the gallery fell with its collapse, but Susannah Darby was the only fatality. Heavy planks hit her on the back of the head. Reportedly, Fanque sought medical attention for his wife at the King Charles Hotel, but a surgeon pronounced her dead.

Years later a 4 March 1854 edition of the Leeds Intelligencer recalled the incident, while announcing the return of Pablo Fanque's Circus to Leeds:

"His last visit, preceding the present one, was unfortunately attended by a very melancholy accident. On that occasion he occupied a circus in King Charles's Croft and part of the building gave way during the time it was occupied by a crowded audience. Several persons were more or less injured by the fall of the timbers composing the part that proved too weak, and Mrs Darby, the wife of the proprietor, was killed. This event, which occurred on Saturday the 18th March 1848, excited much sympathy throughout the borough. A neat monument with an impressive inscription is placed above the grave of Mrs Darby, in the Woodhouse Lane Cemetery."

In June 1848, widower Fanque married Elizabeth Corker, a circus rider and daughter of George Corker of Bradford. Corker was 22 years old. With Corker, Fanque had two more sons, George (1854–1881) and Edward Charles "Ted" (1855–1937). Both joined the circus. Ted, known as Ted Pablo, also achieved acclaim as a boxer. A daughter, Caroline Susannah, died aged 1 year and 4 months and is buried in the same plot as Susannah and William, as recorded on the gravestone.

The 1861 census records Fanque as living with a woman named Sarah, 25, who is described as his wife. In 1871, just before he died, census records show him living again with his wife Elizabeth and his two sons, in Stockport.

In Warriston Cemetery in Edinburgh stands a tombstone dedicated to the memory of two of Fanque's children with Elizabeth Corker—William Batty Patrick Darby (13 months) and Elizabeth Darby (3 years). Both died in 1852, Elizabeth in Tuam, Ireland. Fanque performed in Edinburgh in the early 1850s.

== Death ==
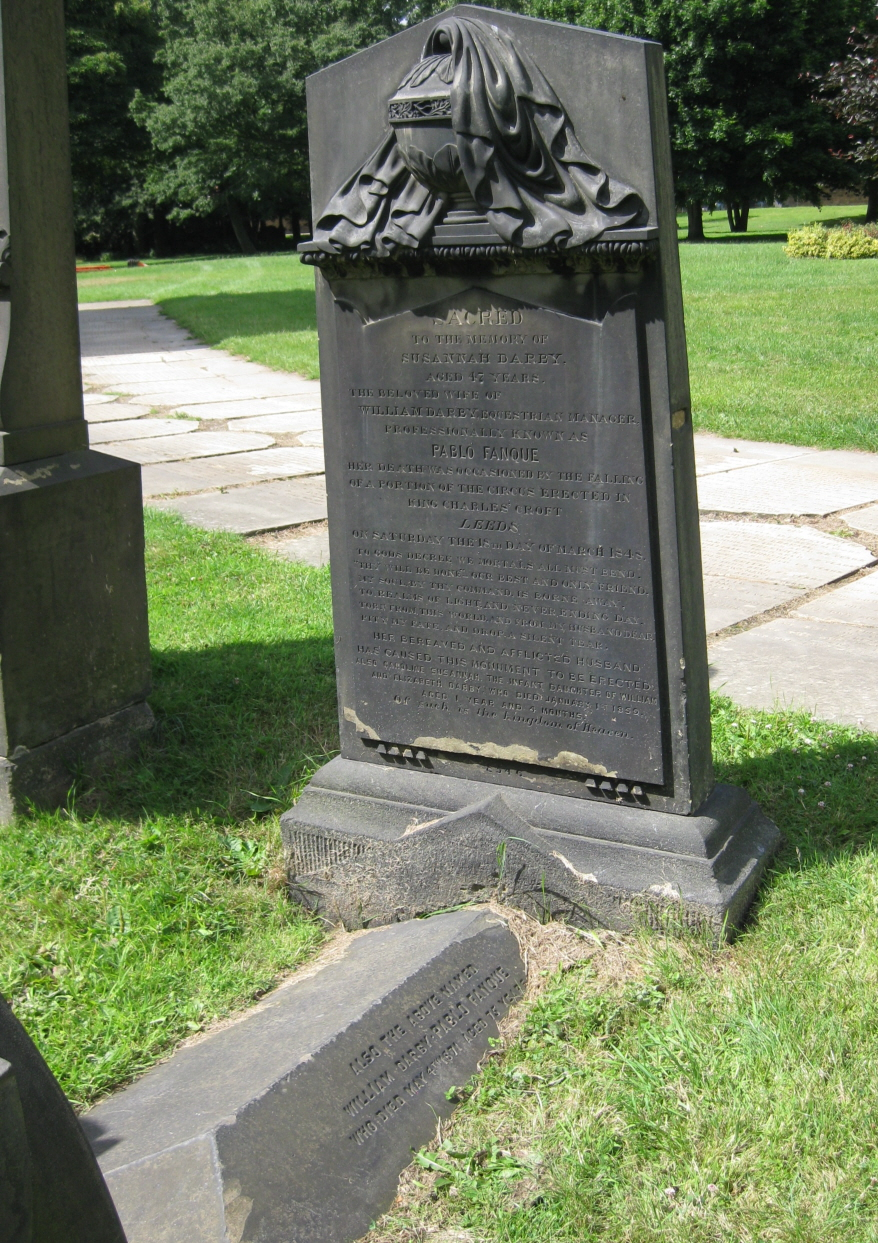
Graves of Susannah and William Darby

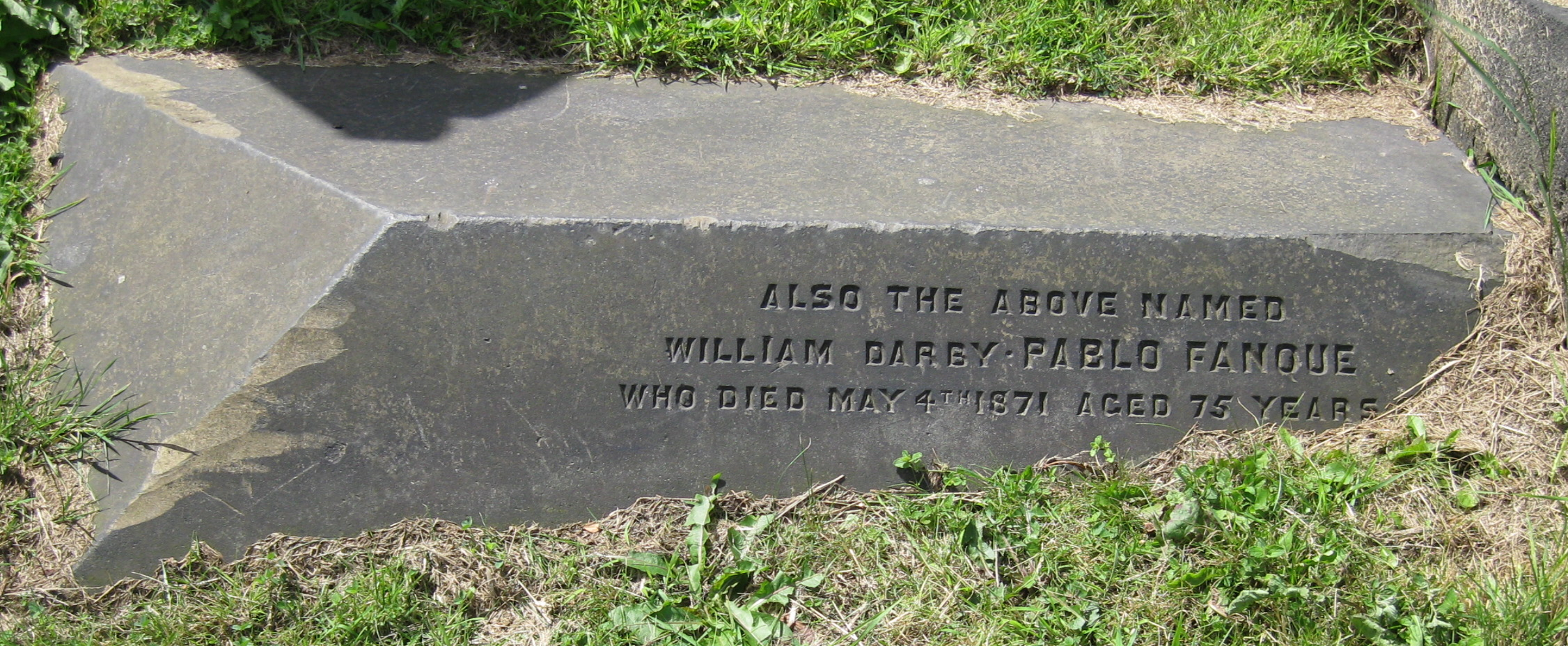
Grave marker of William Darby

Pablo Fanque died of bronchitis at the Britannia Inn at 22 Churchgate in Stockport, England on 4 May 1871. In the funeral procession to Woodhouse Lane Cemetery, Leeds, a band marched ahead of Fanque's hearse playing the "Dead March". Fanque's favourite horse followed, along with four coaches and mourners. Fanque is buried next to his first wife Susannah Darby.

Woodhouse Lane Cemetery is now St. George's Field and part of the University of Leeds campus. While the remains of many of the 100,000 graves and monuments have been relocated, the monument that Fanque erected in his wife's memory, and a smaller modest monument in his memory still stand. Susannah Darby's monument reads:

SACRED
TO THE MEMORY OF
SUSANNAH DARBY
AGED 47 YEARS
THE BELOVED WIFE OF
WILLIAM DARBY, EQUESTRIAN MANAGER
PROFESSIONALLY KNOWN AS
PABLO FANQUE
HER DEATH WAS OCCASIONED BY THE FALLING
OF A PART OF THE CIRCUS ERECTED IN
KING CHARLES' CROFT
LEEDS
ON SATURDAY THE 18TH DAY OF MAY 1848
HER BEREAVED AND AFFLICTED HUSBAND
HAS CAUSED THIS MONUMENT TO BE ERECTED
ALSO CAROLINE SUSANNAH, THE INFANT DAUGHTER OF WILLIAM
AND ELIZABETH DARBY WHO DIED JANUARY 1ST 1859
AGED 1 YEAR AND 4 MONTHS
Of such is the kingdom of Heaven.

Fanque's monument reads:

ALSO THE ABOVE NAMED
WILLIAM DARBY PABLO FANQUE
WHO DIED MAY 4TH 1871 AGED 75 YEARS.

On 8 October 2010, as part of Light Night ceremony, the Leeds University Union unveiled a blue plaque commemorating Pablo Fanque's final resting place.

== Legacy ==
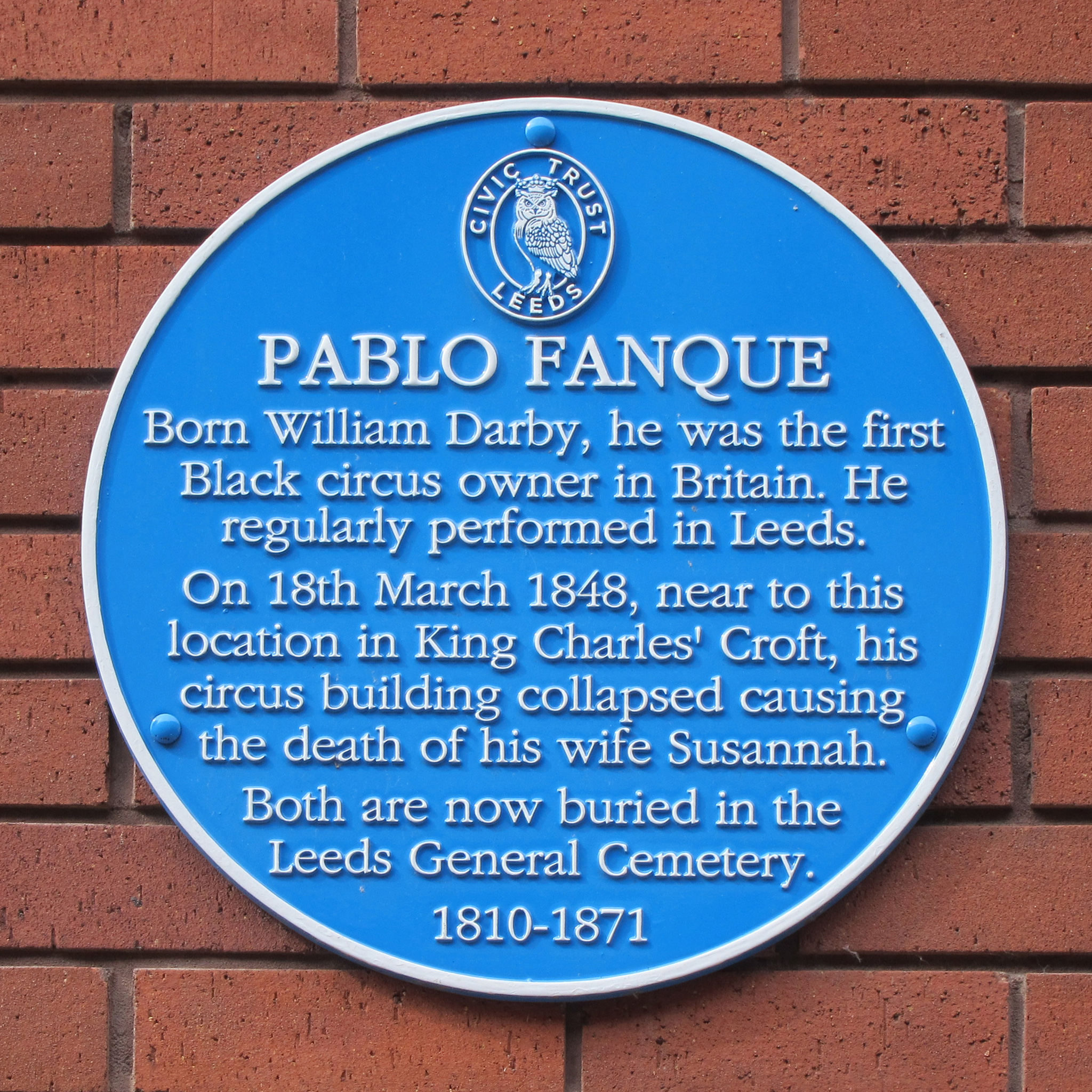
Leeds Civic Trust commemorative plaque

- In 2010, Fanque was honoured in his birthplace of Norwich by a commemorative blue plaque on the wall of the John Lewis department store on All Saints Green, believed to be near his birthplace.
- On 16 September 2023 a blue plaque was unveiled by Leeds Civic Trust
- Thirty years after Fanque's death, the chaplain of the Showmen's Guild of Great Britain, Reverend Thomas Horne, wrote: "In the great brotherhood of the equestrian world there is no colour line [bar], for, although Pablo Fanque was of African extraction, he speedily made his way to the top of his profession. The camaraderie of the ring has but one test—ability."
- A wood-engraving of Pablo Fanque upon his horse from the 20 March 1847 issue of the Illustrated London News (captioned, ASTLEY'S:--MR. PABLO FANQUE, AND HIS TRAINED STEED) appears on the cover of the 2003 book Black Victorians, Black Victoriana, edited by Gretchen Holbrook Gerzina.
- In 2008, a gallery named Pablo Fanque opened in Sydney, New South Wales, Australia, showcasing limited-edition wearable and small-scale artworks and contemporary collectible jewelry and objects from across Australia and overseas.
- Fanque is also mentioned in the 1974 song "Ritz" by the band Cockney Rebel.
- In 2018, Pablo Fanque House, a student accommodation block, opened near his birthplace in Norwich.

== Others by the same name ==
On 2 November 1865, New Zealand's The West Coast Times reported on the arrival in Hokitika the previous evening from Melbourne, Australia of the ship Gothenburg. The paper stated, "She brings to our shores Mr Stevens; English Troupe of acrobats consisting of Mr and Mrs Stevens, the masters Stevens (two), Pablo Fanque and son, Messrs Hatton, Briggs, Rayner, Wilkins, Charles, Wildt, and Master Poono ...." This was not the Pablo Fanque of British fame, but Fanque's nephew, William "Billy" Banham, who used his famous uncle's name as a pseudonym during his time in New Zealand and Australia in the 1850s and 1860s.

Fanque's son, Ted Pablo, may have also fought under the name Pablo Fanque in his Australian boxing matches.
