= Margate Cemetery =

Cemetery in Kent, England

- Interactive map of Margate Cemetery

Details
- Established: 1856
- Location: Margate
- Country: England
- Coordinates: 51.373°N 1.376°E
- Website: St John’s Cemetery, Margate
- Find a Grave: Margate Cemetery

St John’s Cemetery, Margate is a cemetery located in Margate, Kent in England. The cemetery dates back to 1856

== History ==
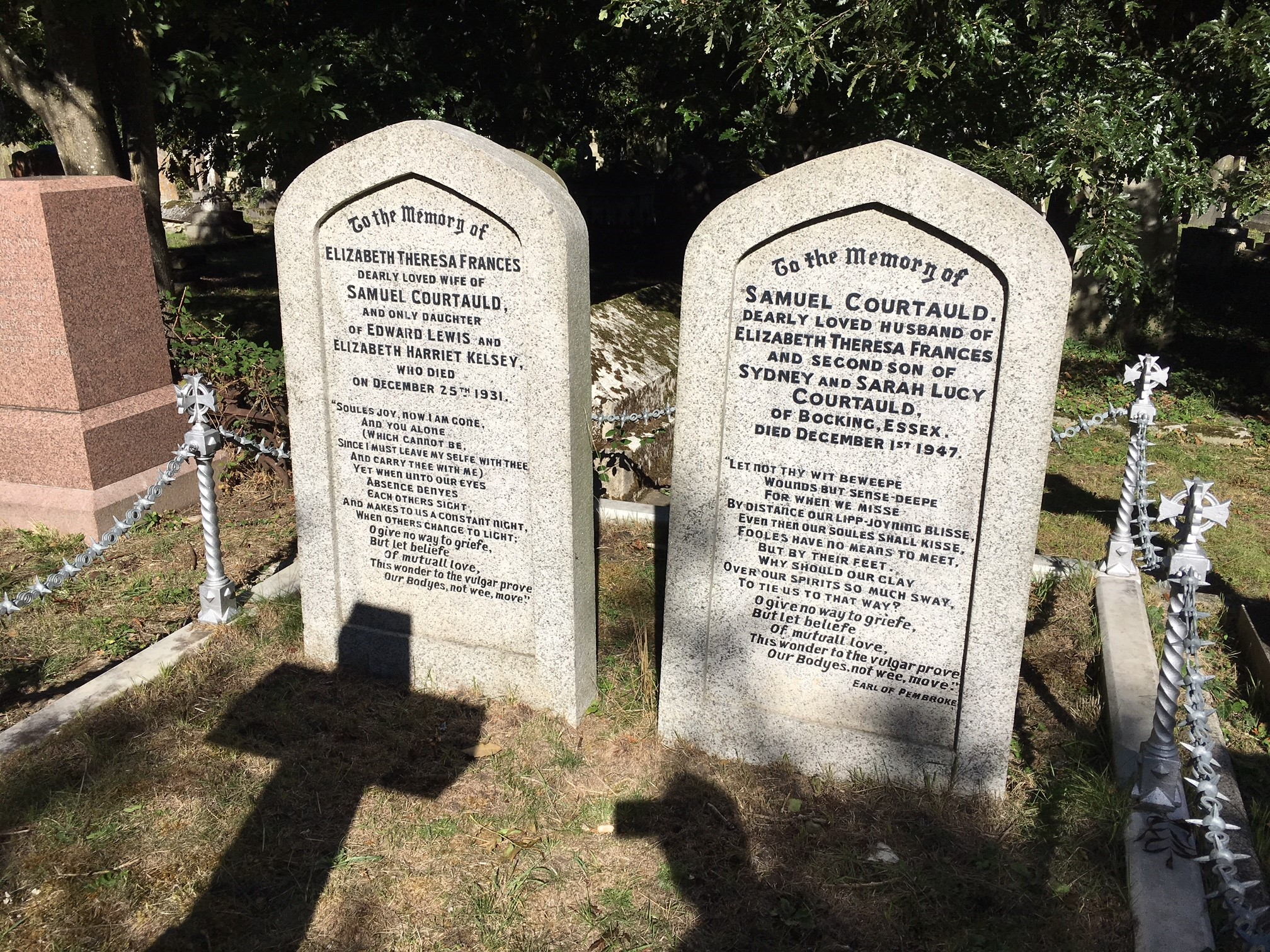
The graves of Samuel and Elizabeth Courtauld

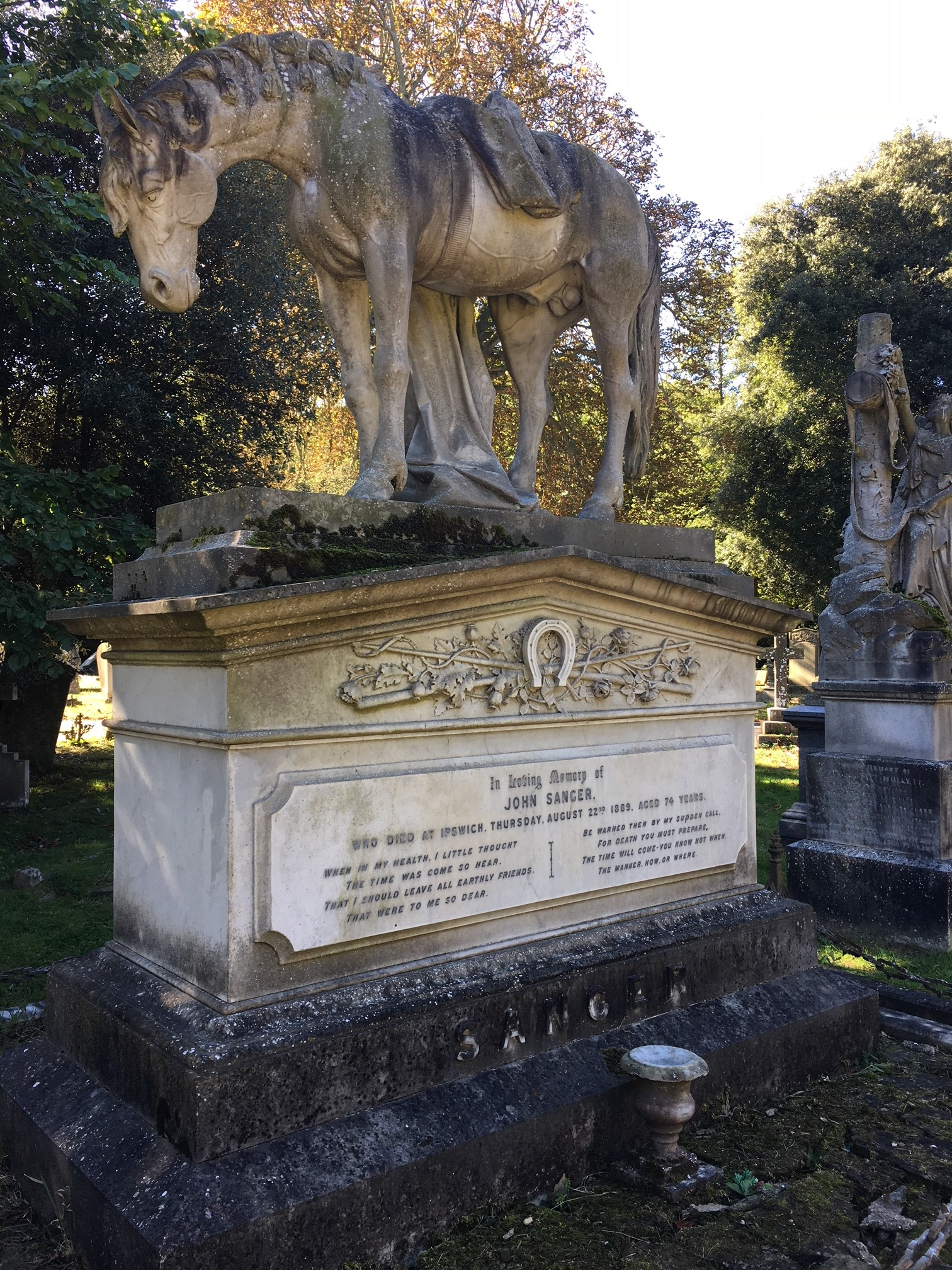
The grave of John Sanger

The Surf Boat Memorial is a Grade II listed building in Margate Cemetery.

== Notable burials ==
- John Allen (RAF officer), flying ace of the Second World War, among the war graves in the cemetery
- Pamela Barton, English amateur golfer, killed serving in Second World War, war grave.
- Samuel Courtauld, art collector
- Thomas Selby Egan, coxswain and rowing coach
- Leslie Fuller, comic actor
- Richard Henry Horne, poet
- Sir William Quiller Orchardson, Scottish portraitist - memorial
- Lord George Sanger, English circus proprietor
- John Sanger, English circus proprietor
- Victoria Sanger Freeman, "the Queen of the Elephants" (ashes)
- Alfie Bass, Actor

== War graves ==
The cemetery contains the war graves of 53 Commonwealth service personnel (two unidentified) of World War I which are scattered throughout the cemetery, and of 83 (three unidentified) from World War Two, in addition to 18 German airmen (one unidentified) who are buried with 50 of the British casualties in a war graves plot in Section 50. A number of dead from the latter war were from the Dunkirk evacuations.
