= James Leathart =

British flying ace of WWII

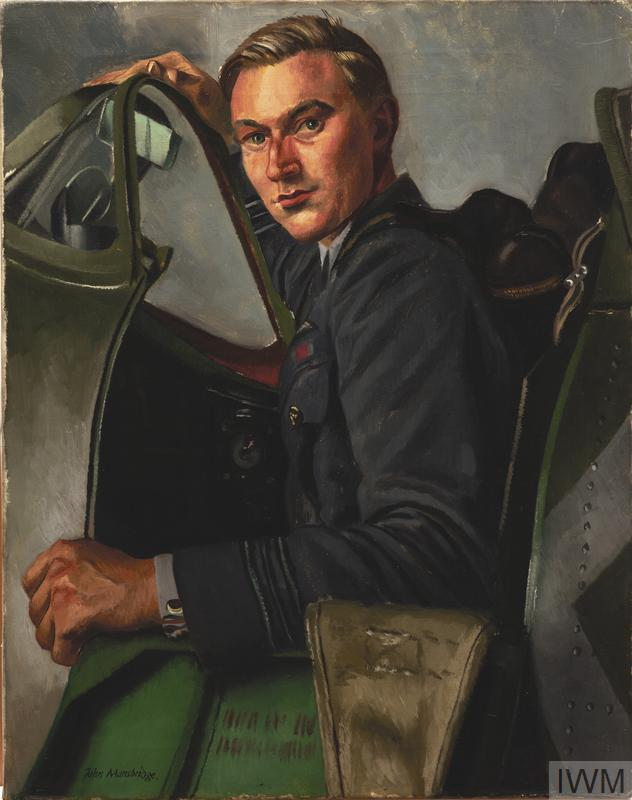
- Portrait of James Leathart, sitting in the cockpit of a Supermarine Spitfire fighter, painted by John Mansbridge in 1940
- Born: 5 January 1915; London
- Died: 18 November 1998 (aged 83)
- Military career
- Allegiance: United Kingdom
- Branch: Royal Air Force
- Service years: 1937–1962
- Rank: Air Commodore
- Nickname: 'Prof'
- Commands: North Coates station Air Defence Operations Centre; No. 148 Wing; No. 89 Squadron; No. 54 Squadron
- Conflicts: Second World War: Battle of France; Battle of Britain; Invasion of Normandy
- Awards: Companion of the Order of the Bath; Distinguished Service Order; Mention in Despatches (2)

James Leathart, CB, DSO (5 January 1915 – 18 November 1998) was a British flying ace who served with the Royal Air Force (RAF) during the Second World War. He was credited with having shot down at least eight aircraft.

Leathart joined the RAF in 1937, having already served in the Auxiliary Air Force for a time. Once his training was completed, he was posted to No. 54 Squadron. He flew Supermarine Spitfire fighters during the Battle of France but used a training aircraft to rescue a downed RAF pilot from Calais in France during a mission for which he was awarded the Distinguished Service Order. He led No. 54 Squadron during its participation in the Battle of Britain and achieved further aerial victories to add to those claimed during the fighting in France. His later war service included periods in the Middle East and he participated in the D-Day landings at Normandy on 6 June 1944. After the war, he remained in the RAF, holding a series of staff postings for most of the remainder of his career in the military. Appointed a Companion of the Order of the Bath in 1960, he retired from the RAF two years later and spend the remainder of his life in Gloucestershire.

== Early life ==
James Anthony Leathart was born in London on 5 January 1915. He went to school in Oxford, where he attended St Edward's School. He then went to the University of Liverpool, from which he obtained a degree in electrical engineering. In May 1936, while still studying, he joined the Auxiliary Air Force and was a foundation member of No. 610 Squadron, formed at Hooton Park and equipped with Hawker Hart light bombers.

In May 1937, Leathart was granted a short service commission as an acting pilot officer. Nicknamed 'Prof' on account of his university education, he underwent his flight instruction with No. 3 Flying Training School at Grantham and then South Cerney. In late November he was posted to No. 54 Squadron, which was based at Hornchurch and equipped with Gloster Gladiator fighters. At the start of 1938, Leathart was confirmed in his rank as pilot officer. He was subsequently promoted to flying officer. In March the following year the squadron began to re-equip with the new Supermarine Spitfire fighter. In July 1939, Leathart was promoted to flight lieutenant.

== Second World War ==
By the time of the outbreak of the Second World War, Leathart was one of No. 54 Squadron's flight commanders. The squadron flew its first sortie on 6 September, but it saw little action in the initial months of the conflict. It achieved its first success on 13 February 1940, when pilots of Leathart's flight destroyed a Heinkel He 111 medium bomber over the English Channel near Kent.

=== Battle of France ===
From mid-May, No. 54 Squadron began to operate over northern France to provide aerial cover for the retreat of the British Expeditionary Force following the German invasion of France and the Low Countries. On 21 May, Leathart destroyed a He 111 off Dunkirk but this was unconfirmed. Two days later, while returning from a sortie to France, Leathart observed a Spitfire going down at an airfield at Calais. Once back at Hornchurch, he realised that this was the aircraft of Squadron Leader Francis White, the commander of No. 74 Squadron which was also based at Hornchurch. With the consent of his senior officer, Leathart decided to make an attempt to rescue White. He flew a Miles Master – a two-seater trainer aircraft – back to Calais with protection provided by a pair of Spitfires, flown by future flying aces Alan Deere and John Allen. Leathart landed at the site where he saw White go down but saw no sign of him. He took off but several Messerschmitt Bf 109 fighters of the Luftwaffe appeared, so Leathart landed his aircraft and ran for cover while the Spitfires flew interference. To his surprise, the ditch in which he sheltered also contained White, who was hiding. Once the area quietened down, both men boarded the Master and Leathart took off and returned safely back at Hornchurch.

No. 54 Squadron flew extensively over the following days and during the evacuation of the BEF from Dunkirk. On 24 May, Leathart shot down a Bf 109 off Calais and then, the following day, destroyed a Messerschmitt Bf 110 heavy fighter to the south of Gravelines, although the latter victory could not be confirmed. On 26 May he shot down two more Bf 110s and also a Junkers Ju 88 medium bomber, all in the Calais region. The next day, flying over Dunkirk, he shared in the destruction of a Ju 88. The same day he was promoted to acting squadron leader and took command of his unit.

=== Battle of Britain ===
After the intensive operations of late May, No. 54 Squadron was briefly based at Catterick for a rest and training up of replacement pilots before returning to Hornchurch for the forthcoming Battle of Britain. A few days later, the award of the Distinguished Service Order (DSO) for Leathart was announced. The published citation, which specifically referred to Leathart's rescue of White from Calais, read:

During May 1940, this officer led his squadron on a large number of offensive patrols over Northern France. On one occasion an attack was made on a formation of no less than 60 enemy aircraft. In company with his Squadron he has shot down fifteen Messerschmitts, and possibly one Heinkel 111 and one Junkers 88, during the period mentioned. He also flew a trainer aircraft to Calais Marck aerodrome to rescue a squadron commander who had been shot down but was uninjured. Whilst taking off, after the rescue, an attack was made by twelve Messerschmitt 109's but with great coolness and skilful evasive tactics Flight Lieutenant Leathart succeeded in shaking off the enemy and landing again without damage. Subsequently he took off and flew back to England unescorted. This officer has displayed great courage, determination and splendid leadership.

— London Gazette, No. 34870, 11 June 1940

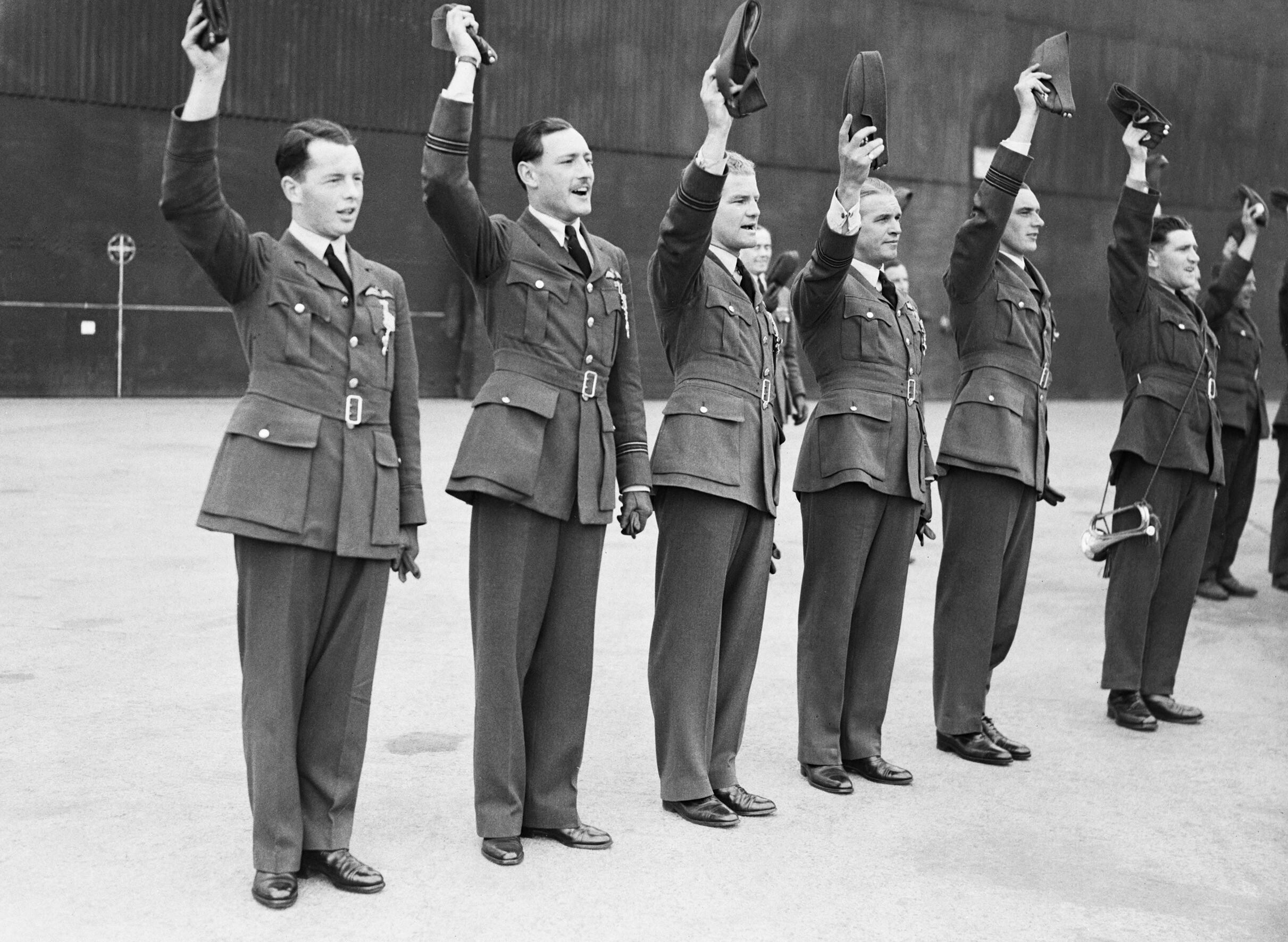
Leathart stands fifth from the left in a line up of RAF personnel cheering King George VI, who had just presented them with gallantry decorations at Hornchurch, 27 June 1940. Fourth left is Adolph Malan and third left is Alan Deere.

On 17 June, Leathart and his squadron intercepted Luftwaffe bombers over Boulogne. He claimed two Ju 88s as destroyed, one of them shared with another pilot, although neither could be confirmed. He was presented with his DSO by King George VI in a ceremony at Hornchurch on 27 June.

Leathart damaged a Dornier Do 17 medium bomber over Calais on 20 July. Five days later he damaged a Bf 109 over the English Channel. On 18 August, he claimed what he reported as a Heinkel He 113 fighter as probably destroyed over Kent, although military aviation historians note that this was actually a Bf 109. He also damaged a Bf 109 the same day. He shot down a Do 17 near Manston on 28 August. Flying near Chatham on 2 September, he destroyed a Bf 109. The next day he claimed another Bf 109 as probably destroyed near Hornchurch. This was the final day of operations for No. 54 Squadron during the campaign over the southeast of England, for it flew north to Catterick for a rest.

Leathart's period as commander of No. 54 Squadron ended in October 1940 when he was posted to a staff role relating to aerial tactics with the Air Ministry. Mentioned in despatches at the start of the following year, in March he was assigned to the headquarters of Fighter Command, as an operations officer for night fighter squadrons. Two months later, he was tasked with the establishment of a night fighter unit for the Royal Canadian Air Force, this being No. 406 Squadron. This was equipped with Bristol Beaufighter heavy fighters and based at Acklington.

=== Later war service ===
In November 1941, Leathart, promoted to acting wing commander, went to the Middle East on a staff posting to the RAF headquarters there. The following month, his squadron leader rank was made substantive. After nearly twelve months, he returned to operations with an appointment as commander of No. 89 Squadron. This was based at Abu Sueir and operated Beaufighters, making interceptions of German and Italian aircraft making raids around the Nile Delta region. Flying to the north of Tripoli with his radar operator, Flight Lieutenant G. Glass, on the night of 22 February 1943, he destroyed a CANT Z.1007 medium bomber.

Leathart's time on operations ended in July 1943 when he returned to the United Kingdom. A staff posting at the headquarters of No. 84 Group, which was subordinate to the Second Tactical Air Force, followed. He was mentioned in despatches for a second time in September. At the end of the year, he was assigned to the staff of Air Chief Marshal Trafford Leigh-Mallory as a pilot. In the hours immediately following the commencement of the invasion of Normandy, he was landed on one of the beaches with a radar set for coordinating night fighter operations. Afterwards he served as deputy senior air staff officer (SASO) at No. 85 Group, being confirmed in his rank of wing commander the month following the D-Day landings. In March 1945, Leathart was promoted to acting group captain and appointed commander of No. 148 Wing, which operated de Havilland Mosquito night fighters.

== Postwar career ==
Following the end of the war in Europe, Leathart was attached to the RAF Staff College. In September 1945 he was granted a permanent commission in the RAF as a squadron leader, with seniority dating from June 1944. In 1948 he was posted to the headquarters of No. 66 Group, and two years later served as the air representative at the Joint Intelligence Bureau and then wing commander, flying in the RAF's Northern Sector. In July 1955, Leathart was promoted to group captain and took command of the Air Defence Operations Centre.

From 1957 to 1958 Leathart was commander of the RAF station at North Coates, during which time he played a role in the introduction to RAF service of the Bloodhound missile. He was then SASO at No. 12 Group. He was made a Companion of the Order of the Bath in the 1960 Birthday Honours, and shortly afterwards was promoted to air commodore. He ended his service with the RAF in July 1962.

== Later life ==
Returning to civilian life, Leathart settled in Gloucestershire where he developed machinery for use in agricultural spraying. He died on 18 November 1998. He was predeceased by his wife Elaine, with who he had two children.

Leathart is credited with the shooting down of eight aircraft, one of which was shared with other pilots. The destruction of three additional aircraft, plus one shared, were unconfirmed. He is also credited with two aircraft probably destroyed and three damaged.
