= Dennis David =

British World War II flying ace

William Dennis David
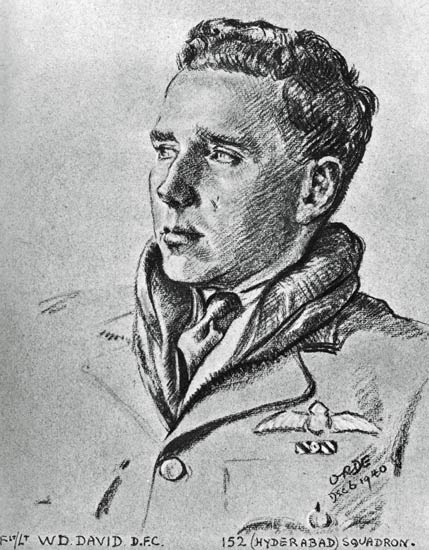
- Portrait of David, made by Cuthbert Orde in December 1940
- Born: 25 July 1918; Surbiton, England
- Died: 25 August 2000 (aged 82)
- Military career
- Allegiance: United Kingdom
- Branch: Royal Air Force
- Service years: 1938–1967
- Rank: Group Captain
- Nickname: 'Hurricane'
- Unit: No. 87 Squadron
- Commands: No. 89 Squadron
- Conflicts: Battle of France; Battle of Britain; Burma Campaign
- Awards: Commander of the Order of the British Empire; Distinguished Flying Cross & Bar; Air Force Cross; Mention in Despatches
- Other work: Founder of Dove Enterprises

William Dennis David, CBE, DFC & Bar, AFC (25 July 1918 – 25 August 2000) was a British Royal Air Force (RAF) fighter pilot and flying ace of the Second World War. He is credited with at least seventeen aerial victories.

Born in Surbiton, David joined the RAF in 1938 on a short service commission. Serving with No. 87 Squadron on the outbreak of the Second World War, he flew extensively in the Battle of France and claimed several aerial victories during this time. On return to the United Kingdom, he was awarded the Distinguished Flying Cross & Bar in recognition of his successes. He claimed more aerial victories in the Battle of Britain. He spent much of 1941 to 1942 on instructing duties before going to the Middle East to serve as a staff officer there. In July 1943, he commanded No. 89 Squadron for a number of months before spending the rest of the war in staff roles. He remained in the RAF in the post-war period, eventually rising to the rank of Group Captain by the time of his retirement in 1967. In civilian life, he started an engineering company and was involved in veteran's affairs. Having published his autobiography the previous year, he died on 25 August 2000, aged 82.

== Early life ==
William Dennis David was born on 25 July 1918 in Surbiton, in what was then the English county of Surrey but now Greater London. His early childhood was spent at Tongwynlais, in Wales, where his family had moved after his birth. The family later returned to Surrey and David was educated at Surbiton County School. Once his education was completed, he worked in a family member's footwear and clothing firm.

In 1937, David joined the Royal Air Force Volunteer Reserve and the following year gained a short service commission in the Royal Air Force (RAF) as an acting pilot officer. His initial flying training was at No. 5 Elementary & Reserve Flying Training School at Hanworth, and from there he proceeded to Uxbridge for an induction course. Further training was completed at No. 5 Flying Training School at Sealand and by the end of the year he had gained his wings. In early 1939, he was posted to No. 87 Squadron. His new unit was based at Debden and operated the Hawker Hurricane fighter.

== Second World War ==
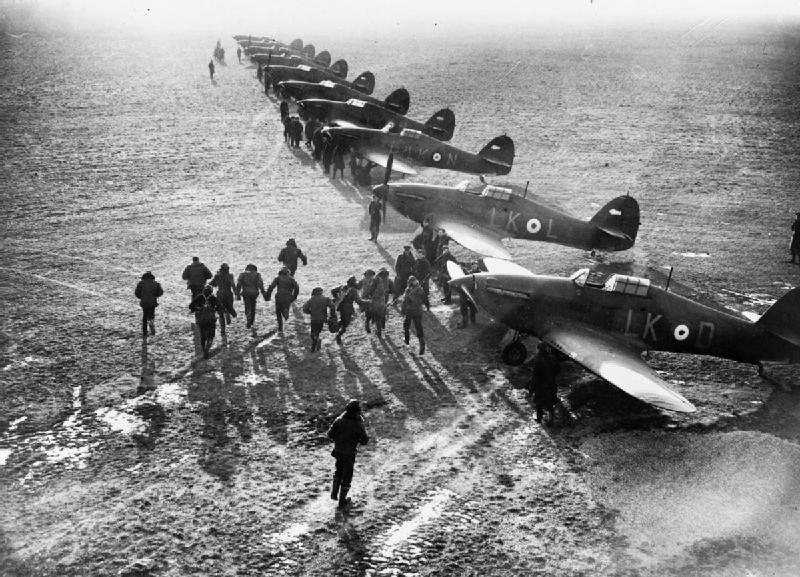
A practice scramble at Lille by pilots of No. 87 Squadron, 1939

On the commencement of the Second World War in September 1939, No. 87 Squadron was sent to France as part of No. 60 Wing, the Air Component of the British Expeditionary Force. Based at Lille for most of the Phoney War, the squadron patrolled along the front lines and sought to intercept Luftwaffe aircraft. On 2 November, David damaged a Heinkel He 111 medium bomber over Poperinge. In April 1940, the squadron moved to Le Touquet.

=== Battle of France ===
On 10 May, the first day of the German invasion of France, David claimed a He 111 as destroyed near Senon, as well as two Dornier Do 17 medium bombers, one being shared with another pilot. The next day, he shot down a Junkers Ju 87 dive bomber and another Do 17. He destroyed a He 111 on 12 May and two more on 14 May, although only one of these was confirmed. One Messerschmitt Bf 109 fighter shot down by David on 16 May was confirmed but another two claimed to have been destroyed were unable to be verified. He damaged a pair of Bf 109s two days later. He shared in the destruction of a He 111 on 19 May, and also destroyed a Messerschmitt Bf 110 heavy fighter. Another Bf 110 and a Bf 109 were also claimed as destroyed but neither could be confirmed.

The squadron withdrew to England on 22 May, returning to Debden following an intensive 12 days of aerial warfare. It then moved onto Church Fenton where it underwent a refit, becoming operational again on 21 June. In the interim, David had been awarded the Distinguished Flying Cross (DFC) and Bar, having shot down eleven aircraft in less than two weeks during the campaign in France. The citation for the DFC read:

This officer has recently shot down four enemy aircraft and shown gallantry and devotion to duty compatible with the highest traditions of the service. His coolness and determination have been a very fine example to the other pilots of the squadron. He was involved in an engagement when six other aircraft of the squadron attacked over forty German aircraft in an attempt to protect Blenheim aircraft. He supported his leader with great courage and determination, shooting down two enemy aircraft.

— London Gazette, No. 34860, 31 May 1940

The citation for the Bar was published five days later, and read:

This officer continued to display a fine offensive spirit and during the past few days he has shot down three more enemy aircraft, making a total of eleven in all.

— London Gazette, No. 34864, 4 June 1940

=== Battle of Britain ===
At the start of July, No. 87 Squadron moved to Exeter, as part of No. 10 Group which defended the south-west coast of England. It remained here for the duration of the Battle of Britain. On 11 August, David shot down a Bf 109 and Junkers Ju 88 medium bomber to the south-west of Portland Bill. On 15 August, he destroyed a Ju 87 to the east of Portland Bill. He shot down a Ju 88 to the west of Portland Harbour on 25 August, also claiming the destruction of a Bf 109 the same day. On 3 September, he was promoted to flying officer. The next day, during a night sortie, he engaged an unidentified German aircraft and claimed it as damaged. On 15 September, what is now known as Battle of Britain Day, he shot down a He 111 to the southwest of Bolt Head.

In mid-October, David was posted to No. 213 Squadron, also based at Exeter, as a flight commander. He destroyed a Ju 88 to the north of Manston on 19 October and later in the month returned to No. 87 Squadron. In November, he was posted to No. 152 Squadron as a flight commander. At the time, it was based at Warmwell, from where it operated Supermarine Spitfire fighters. By this time, the Battle of Britain was over and the squadron was engaged in defensive patrolling.

=== Later war service ===
David was rested from operations in March 1941 and posted to No. 55 Operational Training Unit (OTU) at Usworth as the chief flying instructor. Three months later he transferred to No. 59 OTU before returning to No. 55 OTU at the end of the year as the wing commander in charge of training. His substantive rank at this time was flight lieutenant but after a few months he was promoted to squadron leader. Mentioned in despatches on 11 June 1942, he was awarded the Air Force Cross in the 1943 New Year Honours.

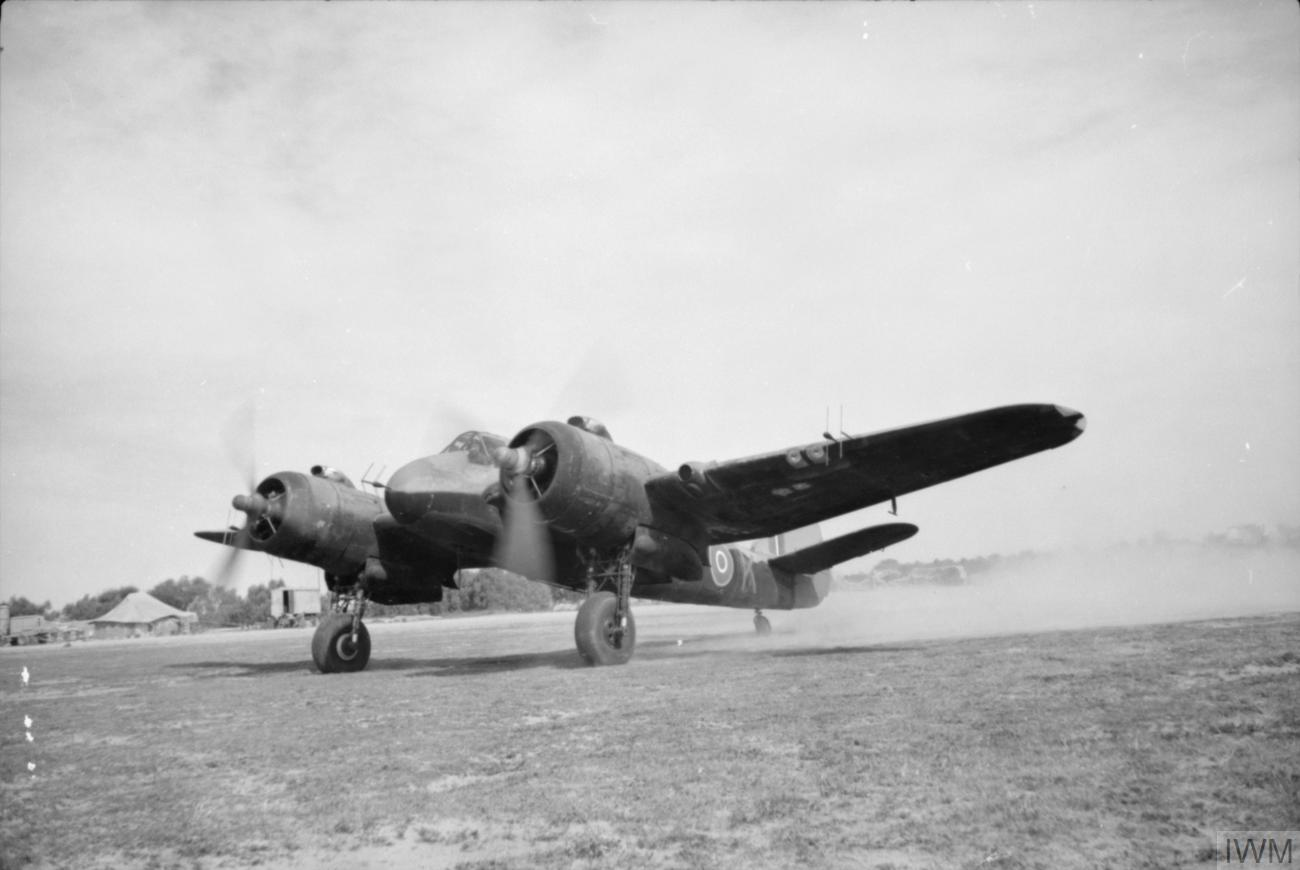
A Bristol Beaufighter heavy fighter of No. 89 Squadron at Castel Benito

In February 1943, David was assigned to No. 209 Group, stationed in the Middle East, as Senior Air Staff Officer (SASO). After six months service in this role, he returned to operational duties with a promotion to acting wing commander and a posting to lead No. 89 Squadron. This was based at Castel Benito in Libya, operating the Bristol Beaufighter heavy fighter on intruder missions to German-occupied Crete. In October, the squadron was transferred to British India, stationed in Ceylon (modern-day Sri Lanka). David led it in the Burma campaign until March 1944, at which time he was appointed sector commander at Trincomalee. Two months later, he was given command of the RAF stations at Minneriya and then Kankesanturai.

Promoted to acting group captain later in the year, David became air advisor at the headquarters of the Indian Army's XV Corps in Arakan. In early 1945, he was appointed SASO at No. 224 Group, remaining in this capacity until the end of the Second World War.

== Postwar period ==
After the war David was based at Batavia in the Dutch East Indies, as the SASO at the Air Headquarters there. On his return to the United Kingdom in April 1946, he opted to remain in the RAF, which required him drop a rank, back to squadron leader. In 1949, he was posted to the Middle East to command a wing of fighter jets, based at Deversoir near the Suez Canal. He was promoted to wing commander on 1 January 1952. He served as an Honorary Aide to Viscount Trenchard, up until the latter's death in early 1956. He was Air Attaché at the British embassy in Budapest during the Hungarian uprising later that year; at this time, he assisted many people in escaping the country.

Promoted to group captain on 1 July 1960, David was appointed Commander of the Order of the British Empire in the 1961 New Year Honours. David retired from the RAF in May 1967, still holding the rank of group captain.

== Later life ==
Returning to civilian life, David established an engineering firm, Dove Enterprises. He was a consultant on two military aviation themed films, Battle of Britain, released in 1969, and Aces High, released in 1976. He was active in veteran's affairs, being involved with the RAF Benevolent Fund and Royal Air Forces Association. He was also president of the Hurricane Society. Made a freeman of London in 1991, his autobiography was published in 1999 as Dennis 'Hurricane' David. Having retired to West London, he died on 25 August 2000, survived by his wife Margaret.

David is credited with having destroyed seventeen aircraft, two of which were shared with other pilots. Five more destroyed aircraft were unconfirmed. He is also credited with four damaged aircraft.
