= No. 89 Squadron RAF =

Defunct flying squadron of the Royal Air Force

- Active: 1 Sep 1917 – 4 Jul 1918; 25 Sep 1941 – 1 May 1946; 15 Sep 1955 – 30 Nov 1958
- Country: United Kingdom
- Branch: Royal Air Force
- Mottos: Latin: Dei Auxilio Telis Meis ("By the help of God with my own weapons")

Insignia
- Squadron Badge heraldry: A wyvern pierced by a flash of lightning
- Squadron Roundel
- Squadron Codes: WP (May 1942 – Jun 1942)

No. 89 Squadron was a Royal Air Force squadron, mainly active in the night fighter role during its existence.

== History ==
=== Formation and World War I ===
No. 89 squadron was formed on 1 September 1917 as a training unit at Netheravon. The squadron was not used for operations and remained a training unit until it was disbanded on 4 July 1918.

=== Re-formation and World War II ===
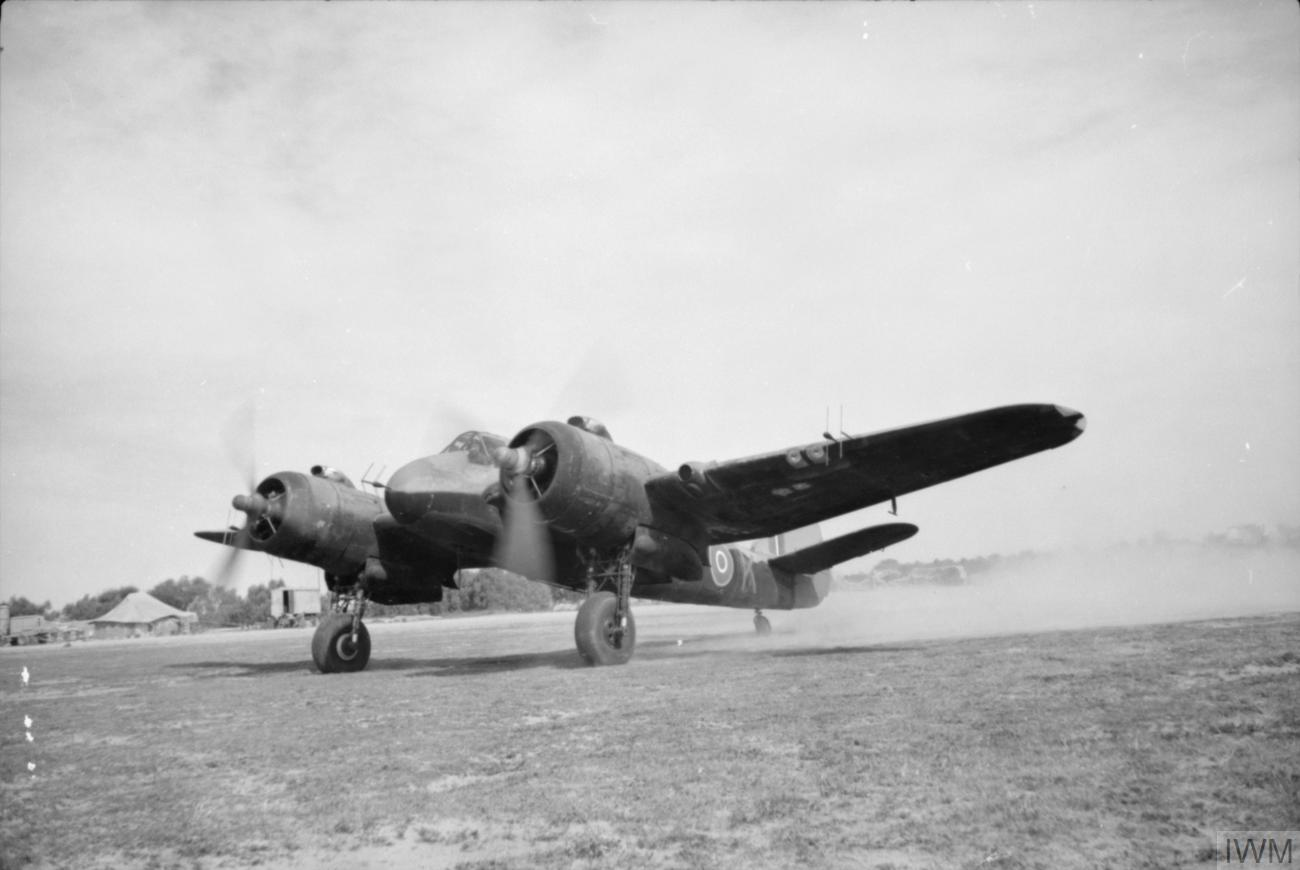
A Bristol Beaufighter nightfighter of No. 89 Squadron at Castel Benito in Libya

The squadron was formed again on 25 September 1941 at RAF Colerne, equipped with Bristol Beaufighter night fighters. The squadron moved out to the Middle East to defend the Nile delta and the Suez Canal. On 3 March 1942 the squadron scored its first victory when it shot down a German Luftwaffe Heinkel He 111. The squadron was active in the Mediterranean area, sending aircraft to Malta and Algiers, and in 1943 sought targets over Crete and later Sicily. With the withdrawal further north of the German night fighter units, the squadron moved first to Ceylon, then in the summer of 1944 to Burma on intruder missions. The aircraft withdrew from operations to convert to the de Havilland Mosquito. Apart from leaflet dropping from Singapore, there was little for the squadron to do and it was disbanded on 1 May 1946.

=== 1950s ===
With the expansion of RAF Fighter Command in the mid-1950s, the squadron was re-formed on 15 September 1955 at RAF Stradishall and equipped with the de Havilland Venom NF.3. Two years later, these were replaced with the Gloster Javelin. It only flew for a year as an all-weather fighter squadron and was disbanded on 30 November 1957, when it was re-numbered as 85 Squadron.

== Aircraft operated ==
From	To	Aircraft	Variant
Sep 1917	Jul 1918	Various, including Royal Aircraft Factory S.E.5	
Sep 1941	Oct 1944	Bristol Beaufighter	Mk.If
Jul 1942	Apr 1945	Bristol Beaufighter	Mk.VIf
Feb 1945	Apr 1945	de Havilland Mosquito	Mk.VI
Apr 1945	Mar 1946	de Havilland Mosquito	Mk.XIX
Mar 1946	Apr 1946	Supermarine Walrus	Mk.II
Dec 1955	Nov 1957	de Havilland Venom	NF.3
Oct 1957	Nov 1958	Gloster Javelin	FAW.2
Oct 1957	Nov 1958	Gloster Javelin	FAW.6

== Commanding officers ==
From	To	Name
Oct 1941	Sep 1942	Wg Cdr G H Stainforth, AFC
Sep 1942	Jun 1943	Wg Cdr J A Leathart, DSO
Jun 1943	Mar 1944	Wg Cdr W D David, DFC & Bar, AFC
Mar 1944	Nov 1944	Wg Cdr A F McGhie
Nov 1944	Jul 1945	Wg Cdr F Collingridge
Jul 1945	Sep 1945	Sqn Ldr A E Browne
Sep 1945	May 1946	Sqn Ldr R J A Good
1957	Nov 1958	Wg Cdr G A Martin, DFC, AFC
