= William Kite =

English circus performer

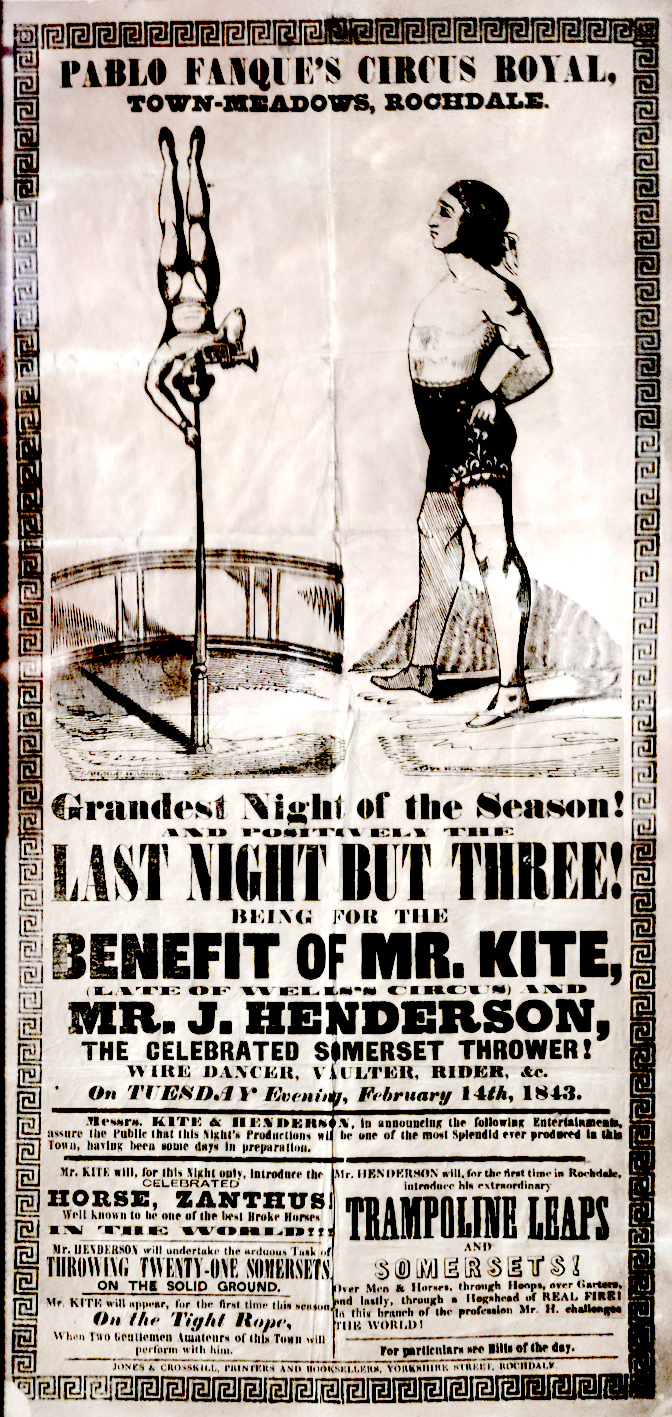
The poster for Pablo Fanque's Circus Royal from 1843 that inspired the Beatles' song "Being for the Benefit of Mr. Kite!"

William Kite (c. 1826 – 9 April 1860) was an English Victorian circus performer and equestrian rider, believed to have been born in Nottingham. Coming from a well-known travelling circus family, Kite became known during the 1840s for his performances as a rider, vaulter, wire dancer, and showman. He performed with several travelling circuses, including that of Pablo Fanque, one of Britain’s most celebrated Victorian circus owners.

Kite was married to Elizabeth Ann Devereux Kite, who also worked as an equestrian performer. Together, the couple travelled throughout England performing before Victorian circus audiences during the height of the travelling circus era.

Kite is best remembered through the famous 1843 circus poster advertising a performance at Pablo Fanque’s Circus Royal in Rochdale. More than a century later, John Lennon discovered the poster in an antique shop and used much of its wording as the basis for the 1967 song "Being for the Benefit of Mr. Kite!" by the Beatles.

Today, although his original grave has been lost, a small memorial cross bearing William Kite’s name stands at Warstone Lane Cemetery — a symbolic tribute to the Victorian performer whose name survived through music long after his burial place disappeared.

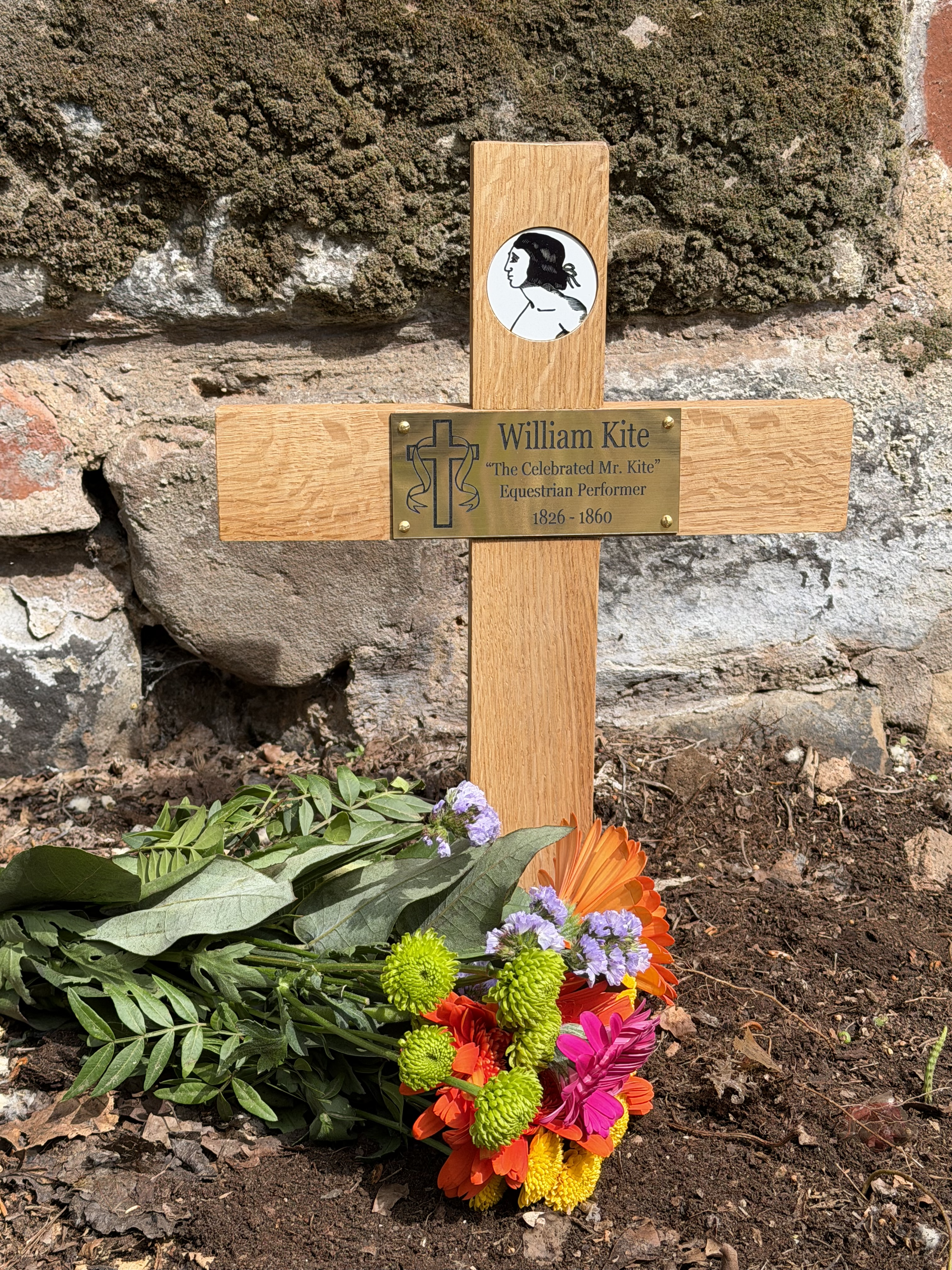
Memorial cross placed at Warstone Lane Cemetery in memory of Victorian circus performer William Kite

== "Being for the Benefit of Mr. Kite!" song ==
A broadside poster advertising Pablo Fanque's Circus Royal show in Rochdale, dated 14 February 1843, inspired, and provided many of the lyrics for, the Beatles' song, "Being for the Benefit of Mr. Kite!" from their 1967 album Sgt. Pepper's Lonely Hearts Club Band. The poster also notes that Mr. Kite was then "late of Wells's Circus." Kite was a riding master for Pablo Fanque at this time and, as documented by the poster, a tightrope walker as well. Kite was also an all-around performer with John Sanger's Circus.

== In other media ==
A fictionalised version of Mr. Kite is portrayed as a ringmaster in a musical sequence from the 2007 film based on the music of the Beatles, Across the Universe. He is played by actor and comedian Eddie Izzard. In the 1978 film Sgt. Pepper's Lonely Hearts Club Band, a character named Mr. Kite is portrayed by George Burns as the mayor of a small town, but has no otherwise relationship to the real figure beyond the Beatles connection.
