= John Allen (RAF officer) =

British flying ace of WWII

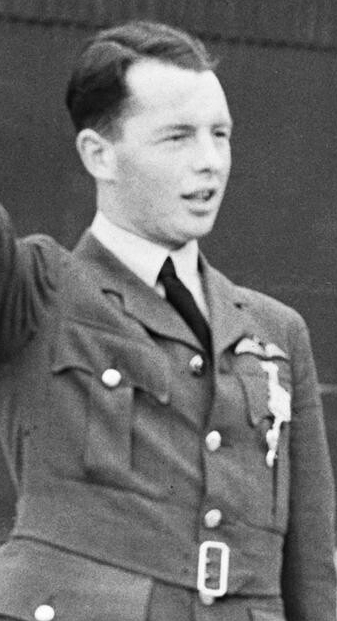
- John Allen, 27 June 1940
- Born: 3 July 1916; Kijabe, British East Africa (now Kenya)
- Died: 24 July 1940 (aged 24) †; Cliftonville, Kent, England
- Burial place: Margate Cemetery, Kent
- Military career
- Allegiance: United Kingdom
- Branch: Royal Air Force
- Service years: 1937–1940
- Rank: Flying Officer
- Unit: No. 54 Squadron
- Conflicts: Second World War: Battle of France; Battle of Britain
- Awards: Distinguished Flying Cross

John Allen, DFC (3 July 1916 – 24 July 1940) was a British flying ace who served with the Royal Air Force (RAF) during the Second World War. He was credited with having shot down at least eight aircraft.

Born in the British East Africa Protectorate, Allen joined the RAF in 1937. Once his training was completed he was posted to No. 54 Squadron and was still with this unit at the time of the outbreak of the Second World War. Flying the Supermarine Spitfire fighter, he achieved several aerial victories while the squadron was involved in the later stages of the Battle of France. He was subsequently awarded the Distinguished Flying Cross. He flew in the early phase of the Battle of Britain, and was killed when his aircraft crashed in flames at Cliftonville after a sortie on 24 July 1940.

== Early life ==
John Laurance Allen was born at Kijabe, in the British East Africa Protectorate (now Kenya) on 3 July 1916, to Kenneth Watson Allen, a Canadian missionary, and his American wife Ruth née Schnieder. In his youth, Allen went to the United Kingdom, and was a student at Battersea Polytechnic in London. Then, in June 1937, he joined the Royal Air Force (RAF) on a short service commission.

Allen, as an acting pilot officer, underwent his flight instruction with No. 8 Flying Training School at Montrose in August. On 18 January 1938, while on a training flight, he crashed his aircraft in fog on Glen Dye moor, in Kincardineshire. He was trapped in the wreckage for nearly a day before he was rescued. In December, having recovered from injuries caused in his crash and completed his training, he was posted to No. 54 Squadron as a pilot officer on probation. This was based at Hornchurch and equipped with Gloster Gladiator fighters but in March the following year the squadron began to reequip with the new Supermarine Spitfire fighter.

== Second World War ==
No. 54 Squadron flew its first sortie of the Second World War on 6 September 1939, but it otherwise saw little action in the initial months of the conflict. In December Allen, who was noted by his fellow pilots for his religious nature, was confirmed in his rank as pilot officer.

=== Battle of France ===
From mid-May 1940, No. 54 Squadron began to operate over northern France to provide aerial cover for the retreat of the British Expeditionary Force (BEF) following the German invasion of France and the Low Countries. On 21 May Allen destroyed a Junkers Ju 88 medium bomber near Calais, No. 54 Squadron's first claim in France. Two days later he and Pilot Officer Alan Deere, a New Zealander flying with the squadron, were detailed to escort Flight Lieutenant James Leathart, flying a Miles Master, a two-seat trainer, to Calais to rescue No. 74 Squadron's commanding officer, Squadron Leader Laurie White, who had made a forced landing at an airfield there. Leathart safely landed the Master at the airfield but while he waited for White, Allen sighted several approaching Messerschmitt Bf 109 fighters and attacked them. He shot down one Bf 109, the destruction of which was observed by Leathart, still on the ground. Allen also reported destroying two other Bf 109s but these were not confirmed. The mission was a success, for Leathart was able to collect White and fly back to Hornchurch. Deere and Allen also safely returned, although the latter's Spitfire had been damaged.

On 24 May, Allen shot down yet another Bf 109 in the vicinity of Calais and this was followed the next day with his destruction of two Messerschmitt Bf 110 heavy fighters to the south of Gravelines. Operation Dynamo, the British effort to evacuate the BEF from Dunkirk, commenced on 26 May and the RAF now began to tightly cover Dunkirk and the English Channel, protecting the ships of the evacuation fleet as much as possible. Accordingly, No. 54 Squadron would fly several times a day to Dunkirk during the evacuation. Allen shot down two Bf 110s on the first day of the evacuation, although only one of these could be confirmed. His Spitfire was damaged in the engagement and he had to bail out over the English Channel. Collected by a Royal Navy destroyer, he returned to the squadron that evening, wearing a naval uniform. The next day, 27 May, he shared with two other pilots in the shooting down of a Ju 88 near Dunkirk.

=== Battle of Britain ===
After the intensive operations of late May, No. 54 Squadron was briefly based at Catterick for a rest and training up of replacement pilots before returning to Hornchurch for the forthcoming Battle of Britain. On 11 June it was formally announced that Allen was to be awarded the Distinguished Flying Cross (DFC) for his exploits of the previous month, including the rescue of White. The citation for the DFC was published in The London Gazette and read:

In May, 1940, this officer was detailed to intercept an enemy raider approaching this country. He proceeded as far as Dunkerque and between that place and Calais on his return journey, he observed thirty Junkers 88's engaged in bombing Calais. Although alone, he climbed to attack and badly damaged one enemy aircraft, whereupon the remainder of the formation disappeared in the clouds. Two days later, in company with a second aircraft, he escorted a trainer aircraft to Calais Marck aerodrome, for the purpose of rescuing a squadron commander who had been shot down there. The trainer aircraft was attacked by twelve Messerschmitt 109's whilst taking off after the rescue, but Pilot Officer Allen in company with the other escorting aircraft immediately engaged these forces. Three of the enemy aircraft were shot down and a further three badly damaged.

— London Gazette, No. 34870, 11 June 1940

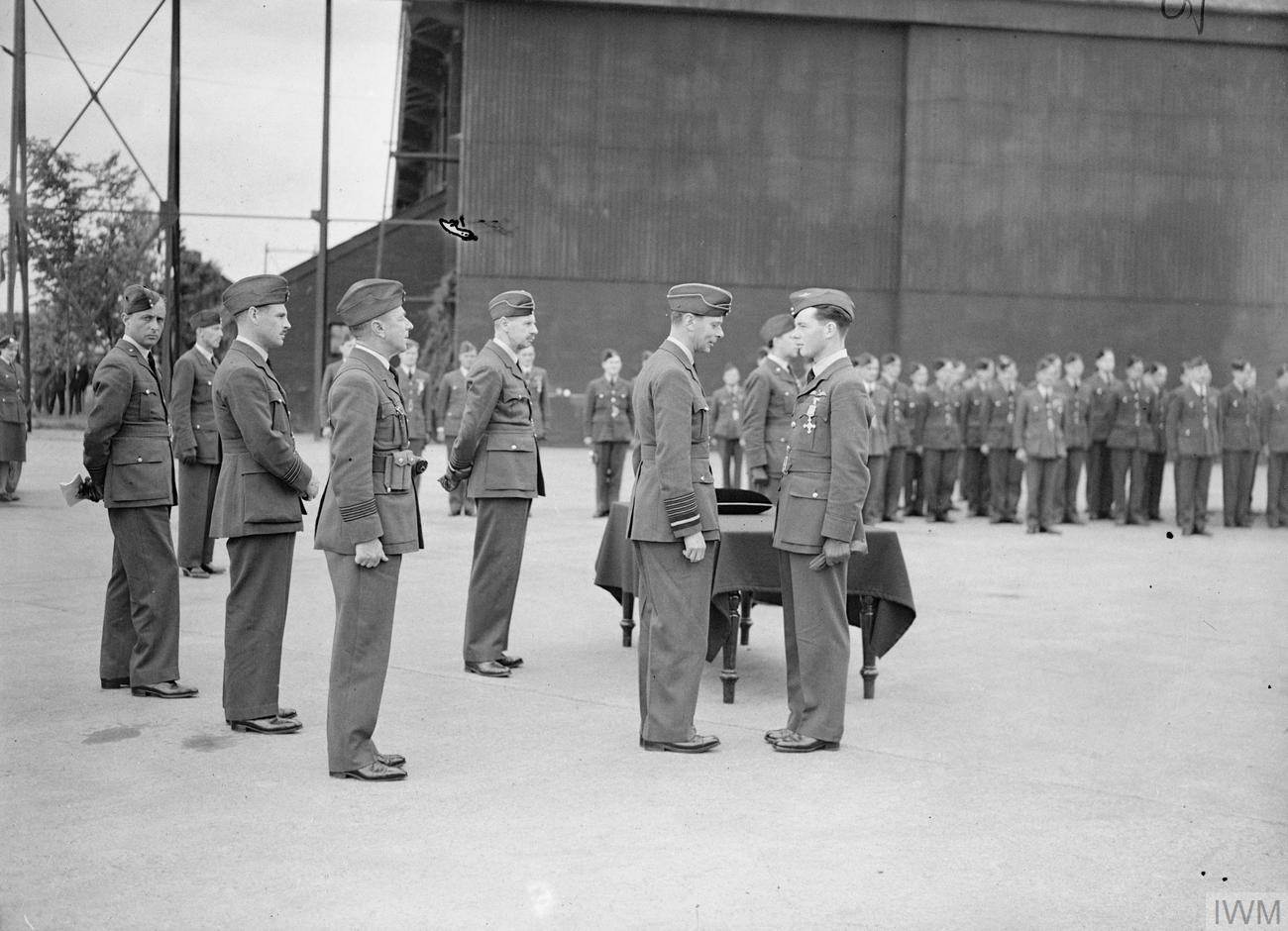
Allen being presented with his Distinguished Flying Cross by King George VI at Hornchurch, 27 June 1940

On 17 June Allen, flying with Leathart and Deere on a sortie to Amiens, destroyed a Ju 88 near Boulogne. Military aviation historian Brian Cull notes that there is a possibility that this was an instance of incorrect identification, as a RAF Bristol Blenheim light bomber went missing in the same area, reportedly after being engaged by a Spitfire. Allen was presented with his DFC by King George VI in a ceremony at Hornchurch on 27 June, Deere also receiving the DFC for his role in the mission of 23 May while Leathart was awarded the Distinguished Service Order. Allen was promoted to flying officer on 5 July.

Allen was credited with the destruction of a Heinkel He 59 floatplane, searching for a Luftwaffe pilot that had come down into the English Channel, about 3 miles (4.8 km) from Deal on 9 July; a local lifeboat towed the He 59, which had put down on the Goodwin Sands, to Deal. He also shot down a Bf 109 although this was not verified. Along with the rest of the squadron, Allen was scrambled to intercept several Dornier Do 17 medium bombers, escorted by Bf 109s, in the late morning of 24 July. During the resulting engagement, which took place off Dover, the engine of his Spitfire was damaged. He evaded the attacking Bf 109s and made for Foreness after his engine cut out. The engine restarted and he attempted to fly to Manston until his Spitfire burst into flames and crashed into the ground at Cliftonville, killing Allen. Bystanders attempted to save him but were thwarted by the intensity of the burning wreckage.

Allen is buried at Margate Cemetery in Kent. He was credited with having shot down eight German aircraft, one of which being shared with other pilots. Another five aerial victories were unconfirmed.
