= Victoria Sanger Freeman =

English circus entertainer

Victoria Sanger Freeman (28 September 1895 – August 1991) was an English circus entertainer.

Victoria Florence Sanger Freeman was a legendary figure in the circus world, where she gained and earned the title "the Queen of the Elephants". She was born on 28 September 1895 into a renowned family which was commanded to appear and perform at Windsor Castle by Queen Victoria.

== Early life ==
Her father having married a cousin once removed, made the young Victoria a Sanger on both sides of the family. She was the great-granddaughter of the original 'Lord' George Sanger. He had bestowed this courtesy peerage on himself when faced with a court battle with Bill Cody, alias Buffalo Bill. On her father's side, she was a granddaughter of Lord George's brother, John. For many years she travelled with the Lord John Sanger Circus (a group of entertainers which had been formed by him).

== Career ==
As a young lady, 'Vicky' had established a good reputation within the circus industry before the outbreak of the First World War. As a bareback rider, she worked with a large group of elephants, comprising several magnificent pachyderms: Annie, Betty, Jinny and Tiny. Having gained such an enviable reputation, Sanger Freeman used her gifts and talents in other big tops. For the first two or three years of the Bertram Mills Circus at Olympia, London, which started in 1920, the Sanger family provided the hub of the performances held there. Later, Sanger Freeman became the last surviving member of the Mills troupe. She also provided the backbone of the annual Christmas Circus at the Crystal Palace in South London.

In 1917 she married James Freeman, a trapeze artiste, highwire walker and clown, among other roles. He was considered to be the most versatile of all British circus performers in his heyday and as a clown under the name of 'Pimpo' was one of the country's most popular jesters. Plans of their marriage did not meet family approval and the two had to meet in secret. The wedding, which was carried out at Burstow Church, was also carried out unknown to her family.

The circus show finally ended in 1962, ending a family tradition which had spanned 117 years.

== Later years ==
James Freeman died in 1961 and Victoria spent her last years quietly in Brixton. Victoria Sanger Freeman died in August 1991. Her ashes were placed in the family plot at Margate where Sanger's 'Hall by the Sea' was — at one time — a crowd puller at the seaside town. She was the last of the great Sanger dynasty. Her obituary appeared in The Daily Telegraph on 21 August 1991.

She had a son, Pat, who followed the family footsteps as a clown. He died at an early age while performing in a circus in Switzerland.

== Books ==
- Massingberd, Hugh, ed. (1998). The Daily Telegraph Third Book of Obituaries: Entertainers. London: Pan. ISBN 9780330367752.
