= Pablo Fanque House =

Building in Norwich, Norfolk

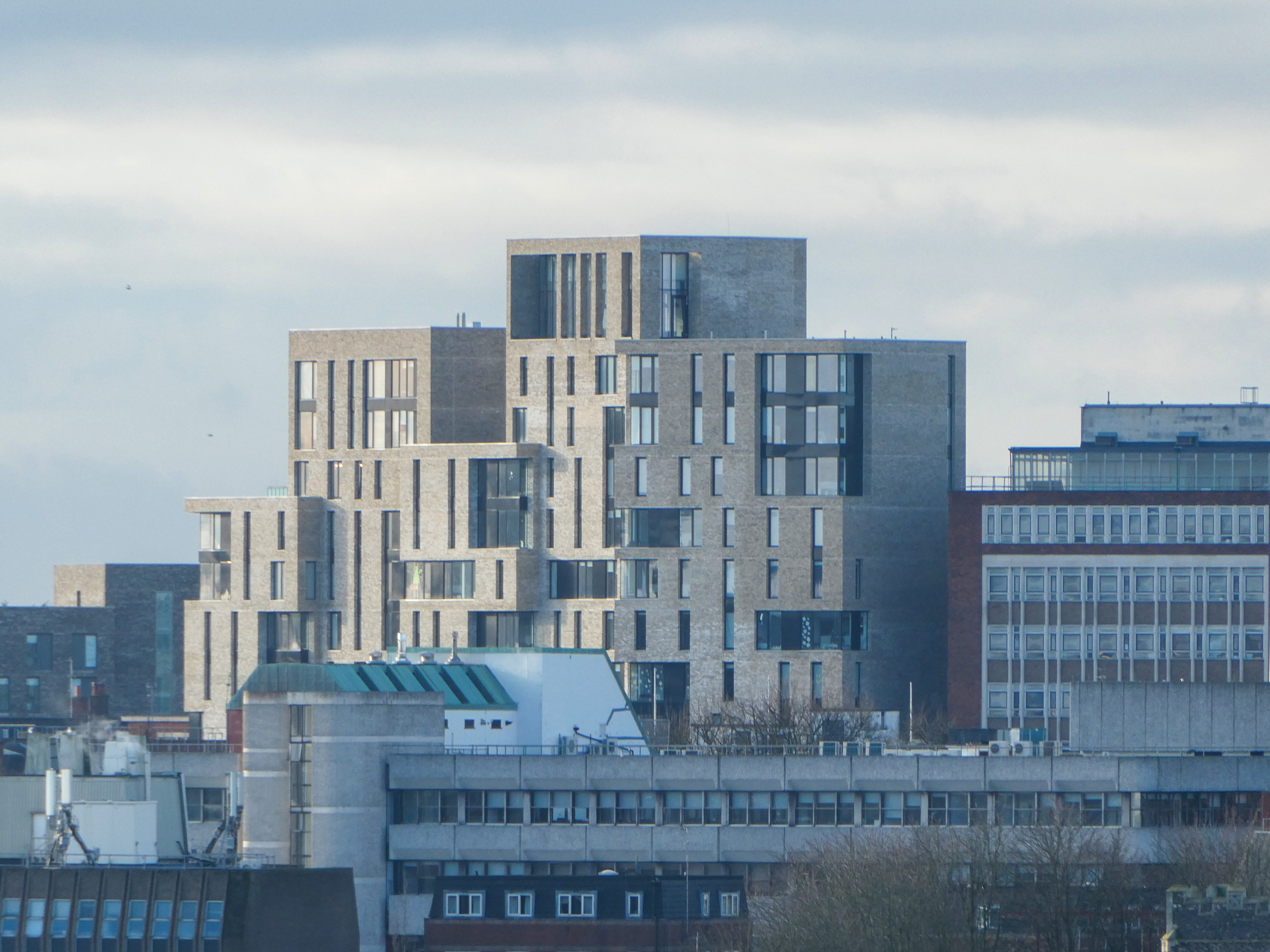
- Interactive map of the Pablo Fanque House area
- Alternative names: The Quad

General information
- Status: Complete
- Type: Mixed use
- Location: 30 All Saints Green, Norwich, United Kingdom
- Coordinates: 52°37′29.3″N 1°17′42.6″E
- Completed: September 2018
- Cost: £15.5M

Height
- Height: 46.2 m (152 ft)

Technical details
- Floor count: 14
- Floor area: 8,210 m^{2} (88,400 sq ft)

Design and construction
- Architects: Carson & Partners
- Developer: Alumno Developments
- Structural engineer: Conisbee
- Services engineer: Silcock Dawson and Partners
- Main contractor: HG Construction

Pablo Fanque House (The Quad) is a residential tower located on All Saints Green in Norwich, England, providing 244 units of student accommodation as well as office space. It stands on the site of the former All Saints Green Mecca Bingo hall, which was demolished in 2014. It stands at a height of 46.2 metres at its tallest, making it the fifth tallest building in Norwich. It was completed in September 2018, at a cost of £15.5 million.

The building is named after Pablo Fanque, a popular showman who was born in Norwich and lived near to where the tower currently stands.

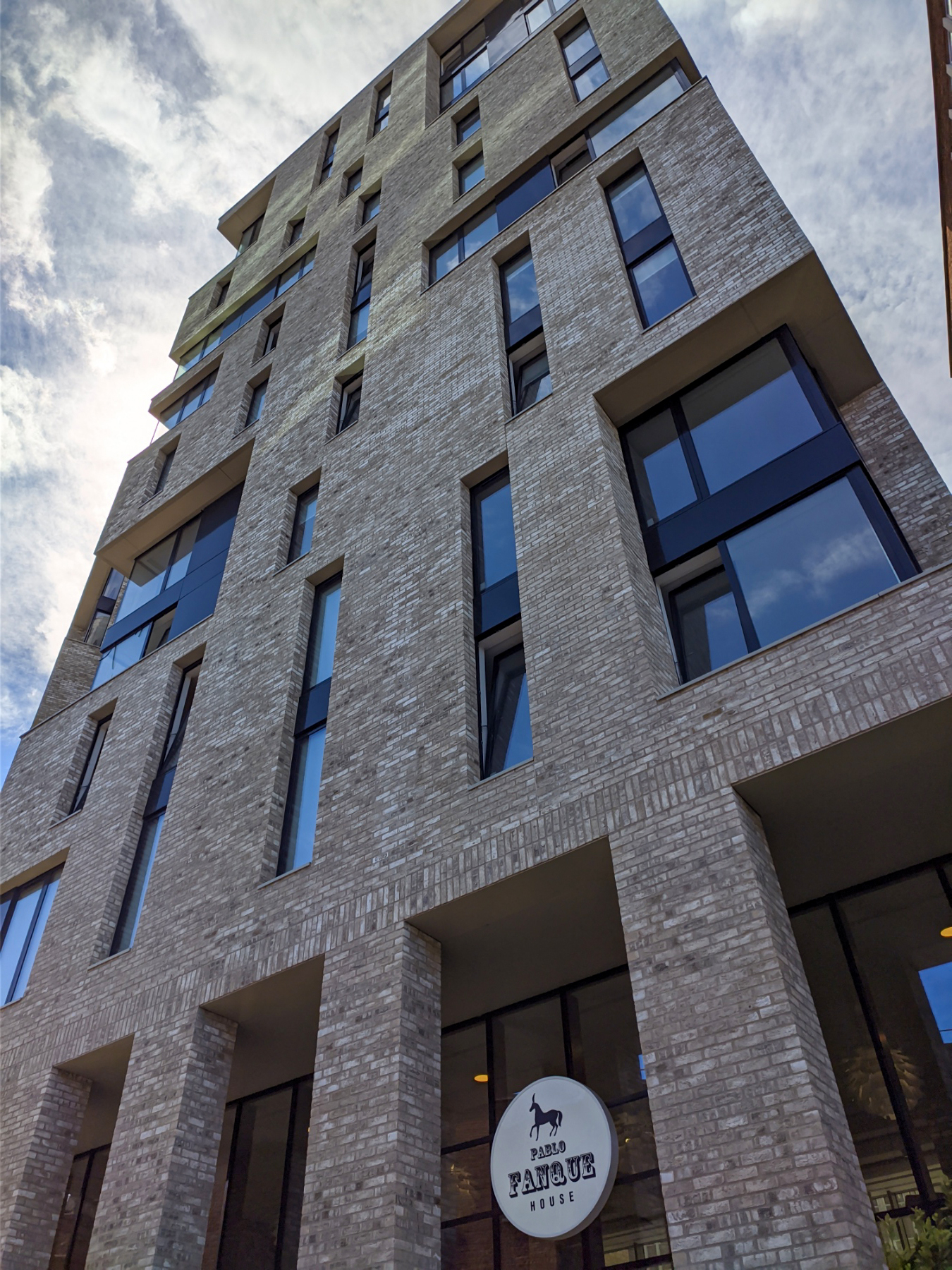
The building, as seen from All Saints Green.

== Design ==
The building is made up of five blocks which increase in height, ranging from eight stories to fourteen at its peak. The façade of the building consists of light-coloured brick and dark-coloured metal infill panels. The building uses stone wool insulation to improve energy efficiency. The student common room is located on the top floor of the building. At the rear of the building are 54 cycle parking spaces, as well as a courtyard which faces the Aviva office buildings.

The building won Bronze in the Architecture Residential Building category of the International Design Awards 2019 and was shortlisted for the 2019 Housing Design Awards.
