= Westlegate Tower =

Coordinates: 52.6261°N 1.2950°E

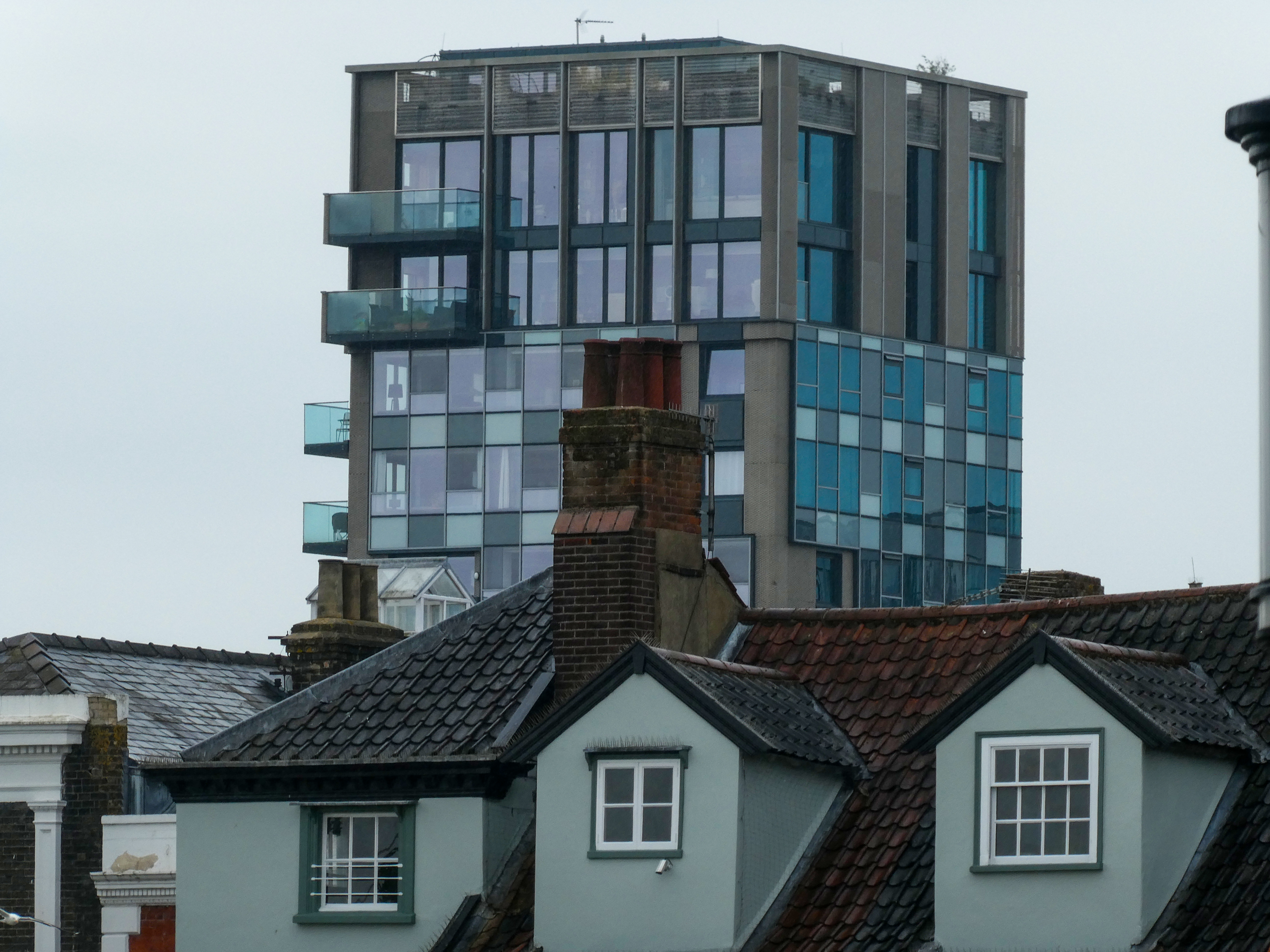
- Interactive map of the Westlegate Tower area
- Alternative names: Westlegate House

General information
- Status: Complete
- Type: Mixed use
- Location: Westlegate, Norwich, United Kingdom
- Completed: 1959
- Renovated: 2014
- Cost: £8 million

Height
- Height: 41 m (135 ft)

Technical details
- Floor count: 13

Design and construction
- Main contractor: FW Properties

Westlegate Tower is a residential tower on the north side of Westlegate in Norwich, England. Standing at 41 meters, it is one of the city's tallest and most modern buildings. The building was initially built as "Westlegate House" in 1959 with 11 floors, reaching a height of 33 meters. The building was refurbished in 2014 at the cost of £8 million and received a height increase to 41 meters. The building includes a multi-level vehicle lift inside to provide parking for the residents. The site is currently managed by Watsons Property Group Ltd.

Westlegate tower consists of 17 apartments, two townhouses and three commercial units. Vehicular access to the site is through the bus lane from All Saints Green. Pedestrian access is maintained.
