= Benefit performance =

A benefit performance is a type of live entertainment which is undertaken for a cause. In its original usage, benefit performances were opportunities for an actor to supplement his/her income. In its modern usage, benefit performances are given to raise money for or awareness of a humanitarian cause, or for the immediate benefit of an audience.

== As a benefit for performers ==
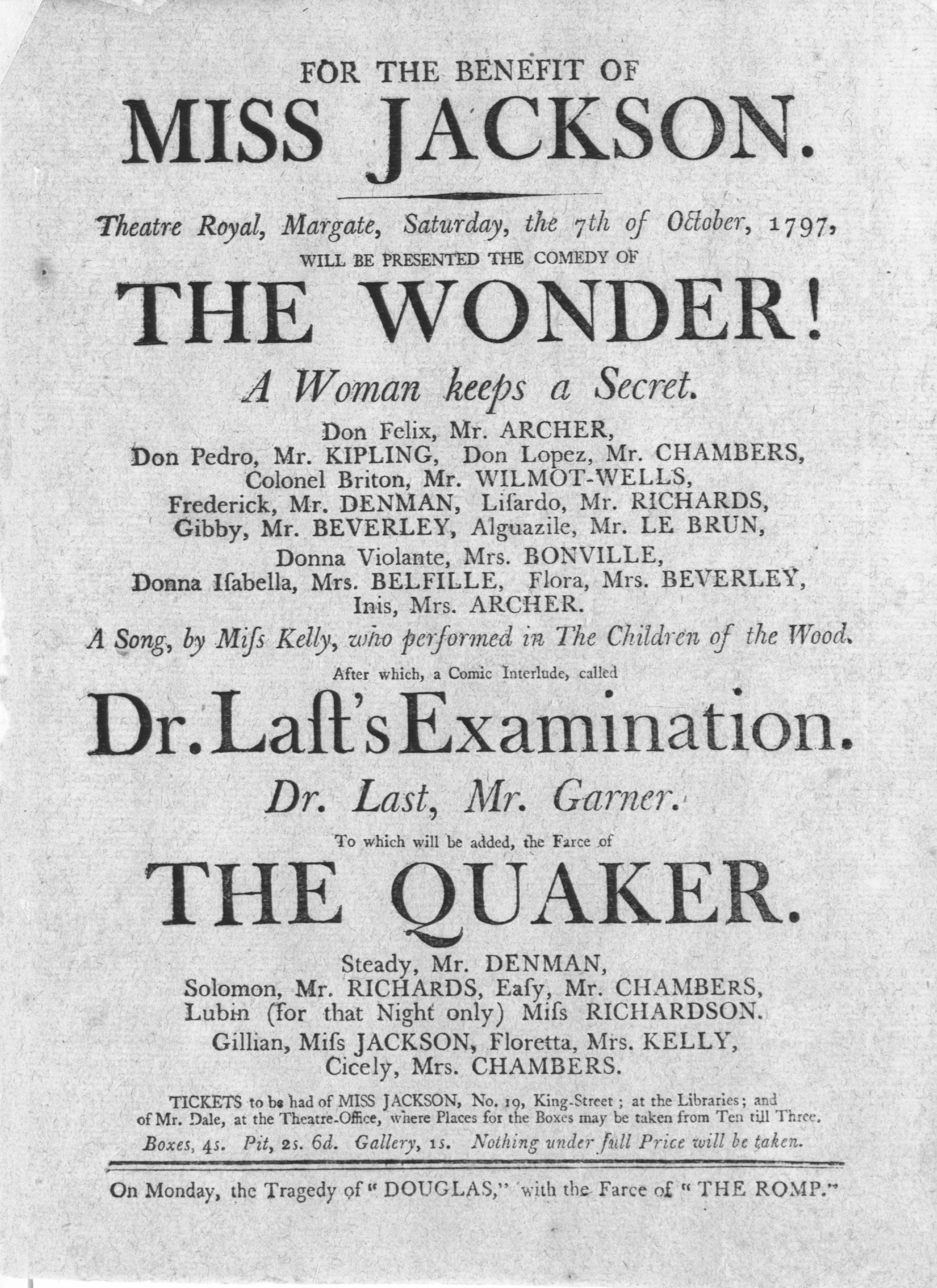
For the benefit of Miss Jackson - a 1797 handbill for a performance at the Theatre Royal, Margate

The concept of a benefit performance originates in England where they were used from at least 1685 to about 1870. During this time, a theater performer (Note: While the benefit was commonly for a leading actor/actress or one who has fallen on hard times, the bénéficiaire could be a prominent musician, director or scenery artist, etc.) would be hired with a contract typically stipulating at least one benefit performance a year. For this event, the actor's employer, the theater company, would offer the bénéficiaire (as the recipient was termed) 100% (in the case of a "clear" benefit) of the event's proceeds as a bonus pay. Other forms of the benefit were the "half-clear" benefit in which the artist was entitled to 50% of the proceeds. There were also instances of multiple actors appearing in and benefiting from a single performance.

While the benefit performance was intended to supplement the actor's income, they were also used by theater companies as an excuse to pay actors a lower salary. The benefit system soon became a strong indicator of an actor's popularity. In some cases, if the ticket sales were low enough, the actor would lose money from the performance.

In the 1860s, the practice of benefit performances began to wane as the theater industry began to change its employment practices. Instead of offering short term contracts, theater companies began to pay actors based on the length of their play's run, which was determined by ticket sales. This allowed managers to pay actors higher salaries so long as plays were profitable.

The Beatles song Being for the Benefit of Mr. Kite! alludes to a poster for one such event.

== As a benefit for humanitarian causes ==
In its modern usage, a benefit performance almost exclusively refers to a fund-raising event. In this case, the performers and producers receive little to no compensation as the proceeds are given to support a humanitarian cause, e.g. charitable foundations, medical research, or humanitarian relief in the aftermath of a natural disaster. Performers may still benefit indirectly from the performance if the cause is for their welfare, e.g. the Actors Benevolent Fund.

Modern benefit concerts are this type of performance, and are often used, in addition to raising funds, as a means of raising awareness of the cause. This is often done by televising the event.

== As a benefit for audiences ==
The concept of a benefit performance also exists as an act of charity by the performers for the sake of the immediate audience. An early example of this is the Disney film Orphan's Benefit (1934) in which Mickey Mouse and his friends put on a free show for a local orphanage. Later in the 20th century, the United Service Organizations (USO) became well known for providing live entertainment to troops overseas to raise morale.

== See also ==
- Benefit concert
- Richard Sale (director), author of 1947 crime novel Benefit Performance
- List of highest-grossing benefit concerts
