= Being for the Benefit of Mr. Kite! =

- Sheet music cover

Song by the Beatles

from the album Sgt. Pepper's Lonely Hearts Club Band
- Released: 26 May 1967
- Recorded: 17, 20 February, 28, 29, 31 March 1967
- Studio: EMI, London
- Genre: Psychedelia; circus music; music hall
- Length: 2:37
- Label: Parlophone (UK); Capitol (US)
- Songwriter: Lennon–McCartney
- Producer: George Martin

Audio sample
- file; help

"Being for the Benefit of Mr. Kite!" is a song recorded by the English rock band the Beatles for their eighth studio album Sgt. Pepper's Lonely Hearts Club Band (1967). It was written and composed primarily by John Lennon and credited to Lennon–McCartney.

Most of the lyrics came from a 19th-century poster advertising an appearance of Pablo Fanque's Circus Royal at Rochdale. "Mr. Kite!" was one of three songs from Sgt. Pepper that were banned from BBC radio, supposedly because the phrase "Henry the Horse" combined two slang words for heroin. Lennon denied that the song had anything to do with heroin.

== Background ==
The circus poster from 1843 that inspired the song

Lennon purchased the original "Mr. Kite" poster in a Sevenoaks antiques shop on 31 January 1967, while the Beatles were filming promotional material for "Strawberry Fields Forever". He claimed years later to still have the poster in his home. "Everything from the song is from that poster", he explained, "except the horse wasn't called Henry." (The poster identifies it as "Zanthus".) The song also changes the location of the performance from Rochdale to Bishopsgate.

The lyrics detail the evening's programme, consisting of a series of acrobatic tricks performed by Messrs. Kite and Henderson. Using a trampoline, Mr. Kite is to fly "over men and horses, hoops and garters" (Note: According to a catalogue of Britishisms found in Beatles lyrics, "'hoops' are probably the staves used to reinforce a hogshead or barrel; used in this sense, 'garter' may also be a circlet of some material through which a performer jumps.") and lastly "through a hogshead of real fire". The Hendersons, meanwhile, will dance and sing, and Mr. Henderson will undertake "ten somersets". Finally, Henry the Horse will dance the waltz.

Mr. Kite is believed to be William Kite, who worked for Pablo Fanque from 1843 to 1845. Mr. Henderson was John Henderson, a wire-walker, equestrian, trampoline artist, and clown. While the poster made no mention of "Hendersons" plural, as Lennon sings, John Henderson did perform with his wife Agnes, the daughter of circus owner Henry Hengler. The Hendersons performed throughout Europe and Russia during the 1840s and 1850s.

"Being for the Benefit of Mr. Kite!" is credited to Lennon–McCartney, but Lennon said he had written it entirely himself. In 1977, when shown a list of songs Lennon claimed to have written (including "Mr. Kite!"), McCartney disputed only "In My Life". In his 1997 memoir, however, he claimed to have co-written the song. In a 2013 interview with Rolling Stone magazine, he recalled spending an afternoon with Lennon writing the song based on the poster, saying that "the song just wrote itself". Pete Shotton, however, in his book John Lennon: In My Life, also remembers Lennon writing the song alone.

== Recording ==
One of the most musically complex songs on Sgt. Pepper, "Mr. Kite!" was recorded by the Beatles on 17 February 1967 with overdubs on 20 February (organ sound effects), 28 March (harmonica, organ, guitar), 29 March (more organ effects) and 31 March. Lennon wanted the track to have a "carnival atmosphere", and told producer George Martin that he wanted "to smell the sawdust on the floor". In the middle eight bars, several recordings of fairground organs and calliope music were spliced together in order to satisfy this request. In a 1968 interview, Martin recalled that he achieved this "by playing the Hammond organ myself and speeding it up". An attempt was made to find a 19th-century steam organ for hire in London, to enhance the carnival atmosphere effect, but to no avail. After a great deal of unsuccessful experimentation, Martin instructed recording engineer Geoff Emerick to chop the tape into pieces with scissors, throw them up in the air, and re-assemble them at random.

Before the start of the first take, Lennon sings the words "For the benefit of Mr. Kite!" in a joke accent, then Emerick announces, "For the Benefit of Mr. Kite! This is take one." Lennon immediately responds, "Being for the Benefit of Mr. Kite!". The exchange is recorded in The Beatles Recording Sessions and is audible on track eight of disc two of Anthology 2. The original recording can also be heard during the loading screen for the song if it is downloaded in the 2009 video game The Beatles: Rock Band.

Although Lennon once said he was "just going through the motions" and "wasn't proud of" the song, in 1980 he described it as "pure, like a painting, a pure watercolour". AllMusic stated, "The Beatles and Martin pulled out all the stops to make a layer of sound that was only possible to create in the recording studio [...] resulting in a sound both redolent of the circuses of bygone days, and as avant-garde as anything in rock music."

== Personnel ==
- John Lennon – double-tracked lead vocals, Hammond organ, and harmonica
- Paul McCartney – harmony vocal, bass guitar, lead guitar
- George Harrison – harmony vocal, harmonica, tambourine, shaker
- Ringo Starr – drums, harmonica, tambourine
- George Martin – piano, harmonium, Lowrey organ, Wurlitzer organ, Mellotron, Hammond organ, glockenspiel, tape loops
- Mal Evans – bass harmonica
- Neil Aspinall – harmonica
- Geoff Emerick – tape loops

== Notes ==
Hoops are standard equipment used by acrobats to jump through. A garter is a ribbon that is jumped over.

== Sources ==
- The Beatles (2000). The Beatles Anthology. San Francisco: Chronicle Books. ISBN 0-8118-2684-8.
- Emerick, Geoff (2006). Here, there, and everywhere : my life recording the music of the Beatles. New York: Penguin. ISBN 978-1-59240-179-6.
- Everett, Walter (1999). The Beatles as Musicians: Revolver Through the Anthology. Oxford University Press. ISBN 978-0-19-512941-0.
- Gilliland, John (1969). "Sergeant Pepper at the Summit: The very best of a very good year" (audio). Pop Chronicles. University of North Texas Libraries.
- Lewisohn, Mark (1988). The Beatles Recording Sessions. New York: Harmony Books. ISBN 0-517-57066-1.
- Miles, Barry (1997). Paul McCartney: Many Years From Now. New York: Henry Holt and Company. ISBN 0-8050-5249-6.
- Sheff, David (2000). All We Are Saying: The Last Major Interview with John Lennon and Yoko Ono. New York: St. Martin's Press. ISBN 0-312-25464-4.
