= Philip Astley =

English circus owner (1742–1814)

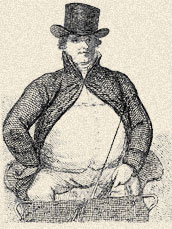
- Born: 8 January 1742; Newcastle-under-Lyme, Staffordshire, England
- Died: 14 October 1814 (aged 72); Paris, France
- Resting place: Père Lachaise Cemetery
- Other name: Father of the Modern Circus
- Occupations: Equestrian, circus owner, inventor
- Known for: Being a forerunner of the modern circus
- Website: https://philipastley.org.uk/

Philip Astley (8 January 1742 – 20 October 1814) was an English equestrian, circus owner, and inventor, regarded as being the "father of the modern circus". Modern circus, as an integrated entertainment experience that includes music, domesticated animals, acrobats, and clowns, traces its heritage to Astley's Amphitheatre, a riding school that Astley founded in London following the success of trick-riding displays given by him and his wife Patty Jones in 1768. Astley's first competitor was equestrian Charles Hughes, who had previously worked with Astley. Together with Charles Dibdin, a famous author of pantomimes, Hughes opened a rival amphitheatre in London, which Dibdin called the Royal Circus and Equestrian Philharmonic Academy.

Astley and his wife Patty put on their first public show on Easter Monday, 4 April 1768. extending the equestrian performance with exhibitions of warlike sabre-work and sword-play. The initial performances were done in the open air at Ha'penny (= Halfpenny) Hatch, a field in Lambeth, London, near the present site of Waterloo railway station. The Astleys also performed at other locations in London. Astley performed his stunts in a circular arena, though Astley never used the title of 'circus' for his shows. Astley's 'Ride' (he also called it 'the Circle') was a ring 65 ft (19 metres) in diameter. Later, the size evolved to become standardised at 42 feet (13 metres) which is the size used by circuses ever since. Leasing more permanent premises at Westminster Bridge from 1769, he improved conditions for audiences with a covered stands. The performances themselves, however, were still performed in the open. In 1770 he hired acrobats, tightrope walkers, jugglers and a clown to fill in the pauses between acts. and so initiated the format which we now know as a 'circus' and which has since spread to many countries.

== Biography ==
Philip Astley was born in Newcastle-under-Lyme in England the son of a cabinetmaker. At the age of nine, he apprenticed with his father, but Astley's dream was to work with horses, so he joined Colonel Eliott's Fifteenth Light Dragoons when he was 17, later becoming a sergeant major. His service in the Seven Years' War brought him into contact with professional trainers and riders. Astley himself was a brilliant rider.

=== Equestrian master ===
Astley had a genius for trick riding. He saw that trick riders received the most attention from the crowds in Islington. He had an idea for opening a riding school in London in which he could also conduct shows of acrobatic riding skill. In 1768, Astley performed in an open field in what is now the Waterloo area of London, behind the present site of St John's Church. Astley added a clown to his shows to amuse the spectators between equestrian sequences, moving to fenced premises just south of Westminster Bridge, where he opened his riding school from 1769 onwards and expanded the content of his shows (see below). He taught riding in the mornings and performed his "feats of horsemanship" in the afternoons.

Astley began to make a reputation and to grow wealthier. After two seasons in London he had to bring some novelty to his performances, so he hired other equestrians, musicians, a clown, jugglers, tumblers, tightrope walkers, and dancing dogs – the modern circus was created. Guilds and lineages of acrobats and clowns had performed throughout Europe for centuries before this, but as members of independent professions, not as part of an integrated entertainment experience for which an all-inclusive ticket was sold.

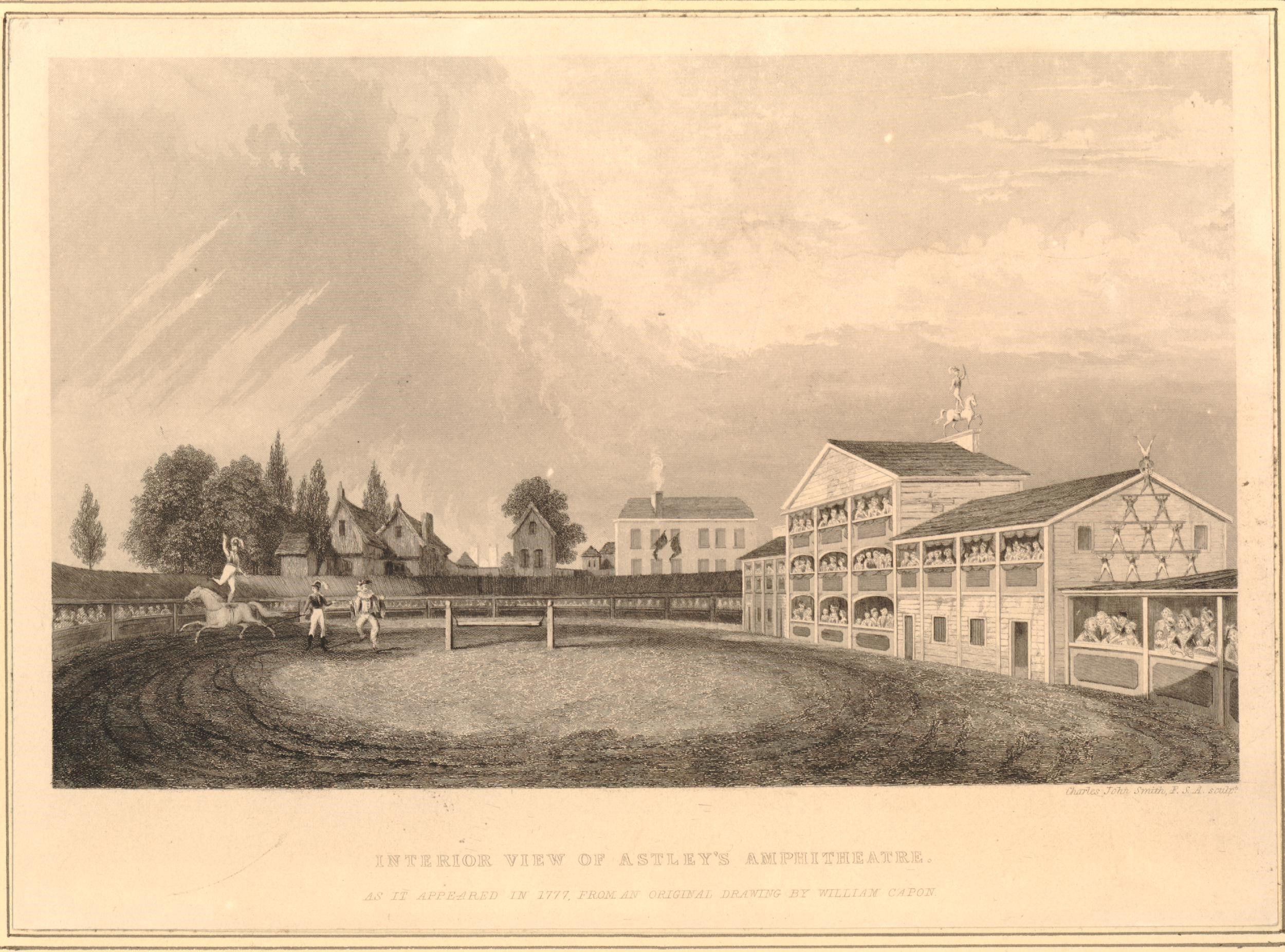
Interior View of Astley's Amphitheatre, 1777 [1840].

Astley did not invent trick-riding, which was already a popular entertainment of the period. Nor did he originate the idea of performing in a circular 'ring'. The use of the circular arena is successful for two reasons. First, it is easier for the audience to keep the riders in sight. Second, the circular ring (though Astley called it 'the Ride') helps riders through the generation of centrifugal force, which assists them in keeping their balance while standing on the backs of their galloping horses. Astley never called his 'Astley's Amphitheatre of Equestrian Arts' a circus; that title was thought up by Charles Dibdin, who in partnership with Astley's rival Charles Hughes, opened the Royal Circus on 4 November 1782, a short distance from Astley's in Lambeth, London. After a few years, Astley added a platform, seats, and a roof to his ring. Even after his death Astley's "Royal Amphitheatre" remained famous throughout the nineteenth century, being mentioned by Charles Dickens and Jane Austen. It was closed in 1893 and was demolished the next year. The garden of St Thomas's Hospital now occupies the site; a commemorative paving stone (see below) marks the Amphitheatre's former position.

Astley's original circus ring was 65 ft (~19 m) in diameter, and later he settled it at 42 ft (~13 m), which has been an international standard for circuses since. Not far from the Amphitheatre site is Hercules Road, named after the house Astley built and named Hercules Hall. The house is long gone, but its name is said to have commemorated Astley's popular human pyramid act, La Force d'Hercule.

=== International success ===
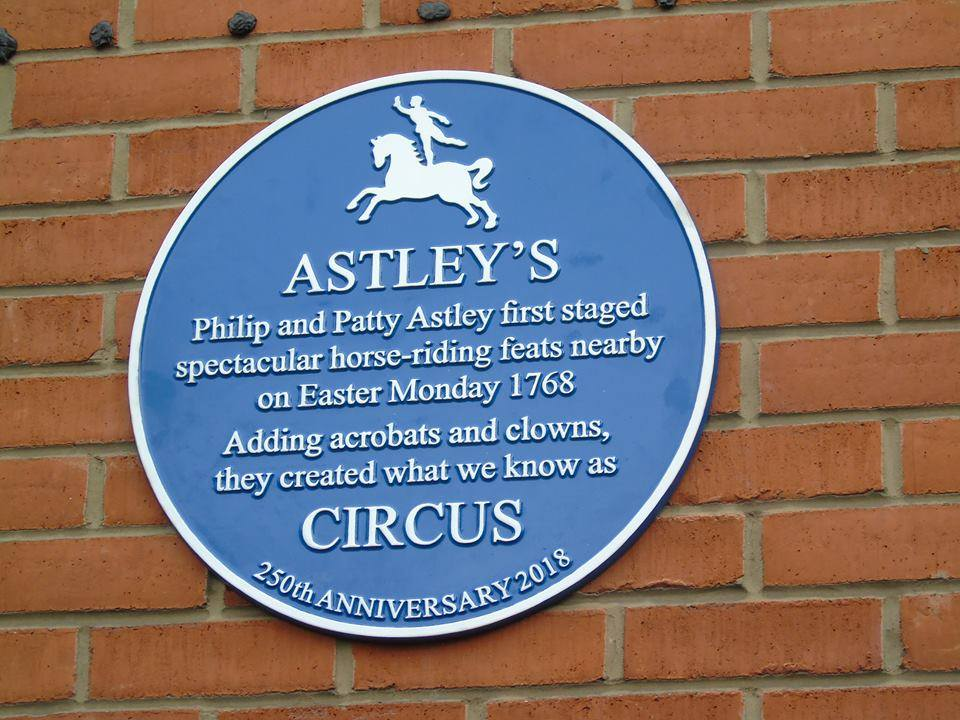
Commemorative plaque at Cornwall Rd. Lambeth, near the site of the world's first circus performances at Ha'penny Hatch. Copyright LERA

Astley's circus was so popular that he was invited in 1772 to perform before Louis XV in Versailles. Having been established from 1769 as a riding school and for open-air performances, the first Astley's Amphitheatre opened in London in 1773; it burned on 17 September 1794, but with abundant resources available due to the venture's prosperity it was rebuilt and, in due course was rebuilt again after successive fires, and eventually grew to become Astley's Royal Amphitheatre. In 1782, Astley established the first purpose-built circus in France, the Amphitheatre Anglais in Paris. Astley then established 18 other permanent circuses in cities throughout Europe.

During the summers and at other times when his London establishment was inactive, Astley began to establish wooden amphitheatres abroad; the first of these was erected in 1773 in Dublin, Ireland. He later established eighteen other circuses in European cities, was patronised by a great number of royals, and was famous, envied, and occasionally rich. He never used wild animals in the circus arena. In 1806, with the profits he had earned from his amphitheatre, Astley opened a new venue, the Olympic Pavilion (also known as the Olympic Theatre) on Wych Street, Westminster, near the Strand. This tent-like structure, partly built from the remains of a French warship, did not prove a success, and in 1813 he sold it to Robert William Elliston, who renamed it the Little Drury Lane. Astley died a year later in Paris and was buried in Père Lachaise Cemetery, the cause of his death being gout in the stomach.

=== Legacy ===
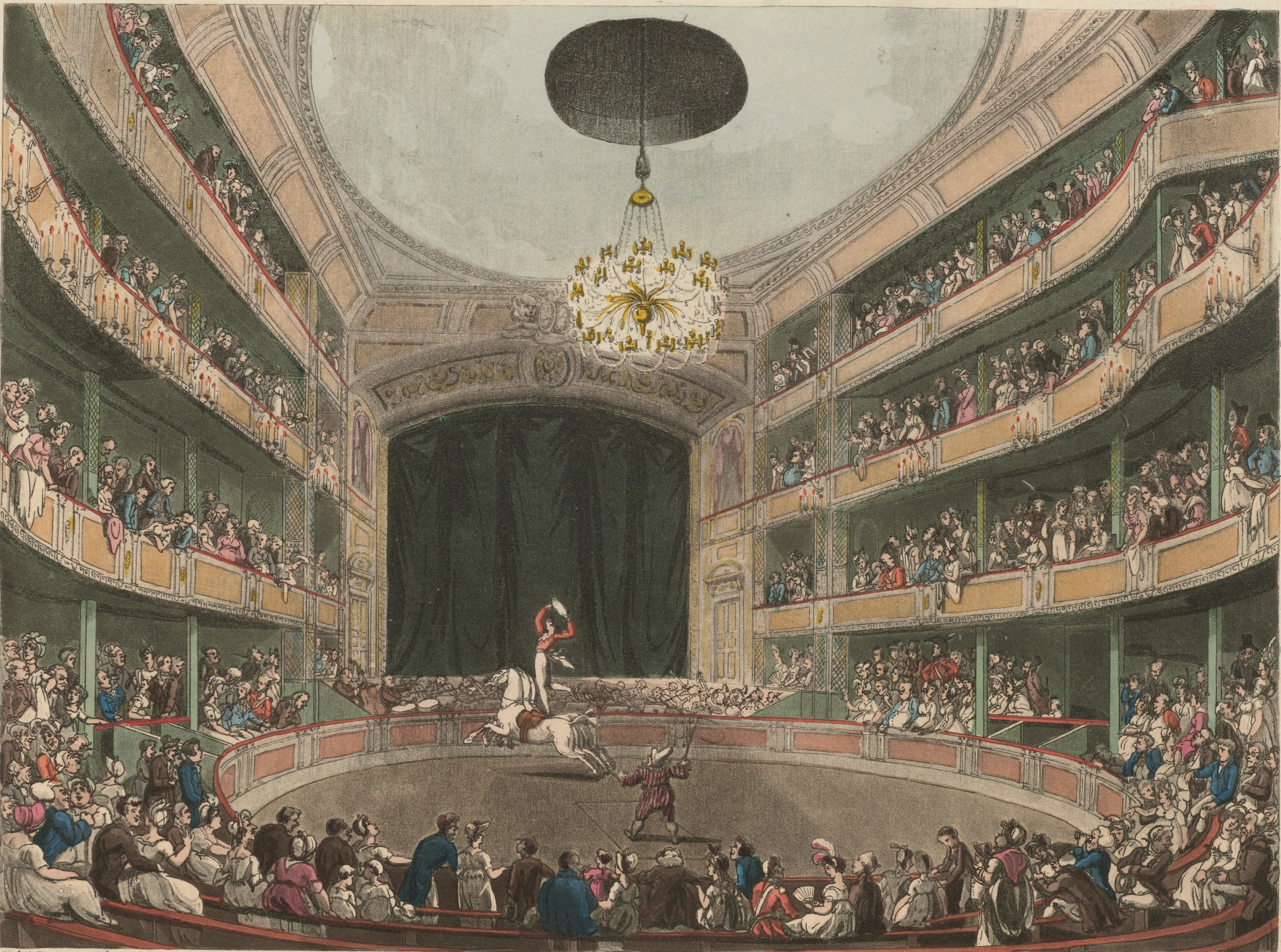
Astley's Amphitheatre in London circa 1808.

Astley's Amphitheatre is mentioned in the popular fiction of Charles Dickens, Jane Austen and William Makepeace Thackeray, among others. In Jane Austen's Emma, in chapter 54: "He delivered these papers to John, at his chambers, and was asked by him to join their party the same evening to Astley's. They were going to take the two eldest boys to Astley's." It is also a motif of James Joyce's Finnegans Wake.

Astley's fame is also marked by the existence of three dance tunes which bear his name: "Astley's Ride(s)", "Astley's Flag" and more common, "Astley's Hornpipe". "Astley's Ride" appears as the first song in the music manuscript book of poet John Clare.

Astley's circus is featured prominently in Tracy Chevalier's novel Burning Bright.

On 31 May 1982 the illusionist Fred Van Buren staged the first celebration of Philip Astley in the form of Newcastle-under-Lyme's annual carnival, which had the theme of Philip Astley's Circus. This event began the journey to bring Astley back into the public's awareness.

Then in 1992 the British magician illusionist Andrew Van Buren commissioned a life-size statue to be made of Philip Astley to celebrate the 250th anniversary of Astley's birth. Van Buren is the Director, Astley expert and curator of Philip Astley Projects CIC, creating and uniting archives, exhibitions and a series of events celebrating the 250th anniversary of circus in 2018 and beyond. In March 2024 the Philip Astley Visitor Centre was opened in Newcastle-under-Lyme.

== Circus 250 ==
The Circus250 celebrations began in January 2018 when Andrew Van Buren joined Albert II, Prince of Monaco, and Princess Stéphanie of Monaco for the unveiling of a plaque to Philip Astley in Monte Carlo. Following this in February 2018 the United Kingdom's first permanent monument to Philip Astley and his legacy of the circus was positioned on the border between Stoke-on-Trent and Newcastle-under-Lyme. The monument was designed by Candida Kelsall, built by PM Training and funded by the Realise Foundation. This was then unveiled on World Circus Day 2018 by Federation Mondiale du Cirque director Zsuzsanna Mata, the Newcastle-under-Lyme Mayor Simon White and Van Buren. A second of these monuments was then positioned in the village of Silverdale, which is the opposite side of Newcastle-under-Lyme.

A commemorative plaque was inaugurated at the Ha'penny Hatch site off Cornwall Road, Lambeth, on Easter Monday 2018, two days before the exact 250th anniversary of the first performances there by the Astleys.. The plaque was provided by the Lambeth Estate Residents' Association and was unveiled by the circus ringmaster Chris Barltrop dressed as Astley and accompanied by horses and riders from Zippo's Circus. In 1989, Barltrop had been the first to identify the site of Astley's Ha'penny (= Halfpenny) Hatch <King Pole Magazine, Circus Friends' Assn of GB/>.

Chris Barltrop researched and wrote a one-man play, Audacious Mr Astley, which he first performed at the Waterloo East Theatre, London, on Easter Monday 2018, and later at the Edinburgh Fringe Festival.

Newcastle-under-Lyme's New Vic Theatre during the summer of 2018 ran the Astley’s Astounding Adventure play, complementing their Roll Up events, which included a street exhibition of Circus art and photography curated by the Victoria and Albert Museum. Other events included The Brampton Museum's exhibition of Philip Astley artefacts. Also the Philip Astley Project's AstleyFest outdoor event which celebrated each aspect of Philip Astley's life and legacy. Astley’s Astounding Adventure was remounted by the New Vic Theatre in 2023.

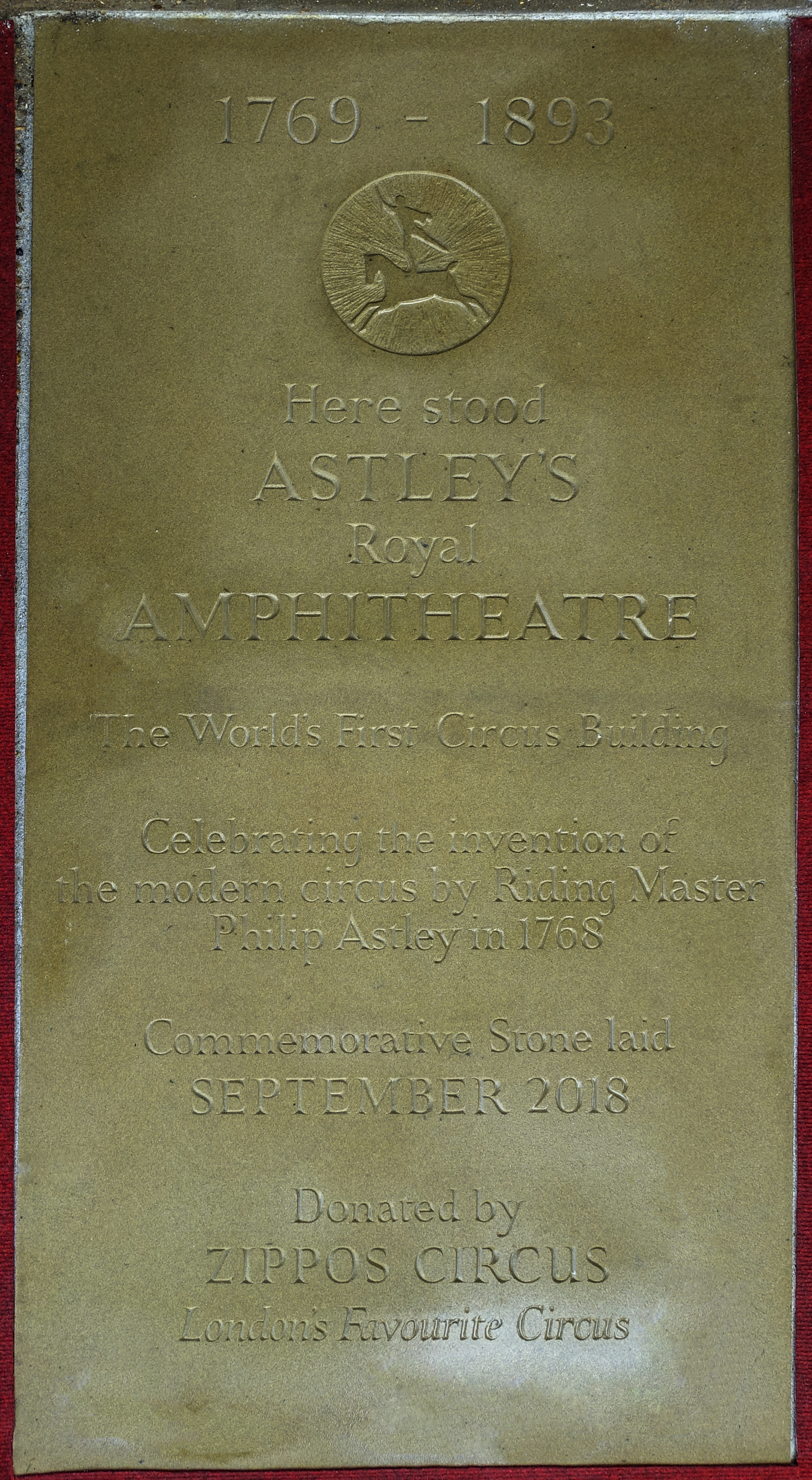
Astley's Amphitheatre flagstone in the garden of St Thomas's Hospital, Lambeth. Copyright Zippos Circus.

On 14 September 2018, a flagstone commemorating the Amphitheatre was inaugurated in the St Thomas's Hospital garden. The flagstone was the initiative of Martin Burton, founder and director of Zippos Circus. A group of fully costumed performers from Zippos, including a trick-rider and his horse, accompanied Burton to help inaugurate the flagstone.

In 2019 a new hardback book was published, written by Karl Shaw entitled The First Showman, bringing together for the first time previously unknown facts and details of Astley's life and family history, as a combination of Shaw's own

One of his descendants is Rick Astley.

== See also ==
- Dan Rice
- John Bill Ricketts
