= Dan Rice (disambiguation) =

Dan Rice was a 19th-century circus entertainer.

Dan Rice may also refer to:

- Dan and Ada Rice, horse breeder
- Daniel Rice, musician with Hadouken!
- Dan Rice (American football)
