= Marietta Zanfretta =

Italian tight-rope dancer (1837–1898)

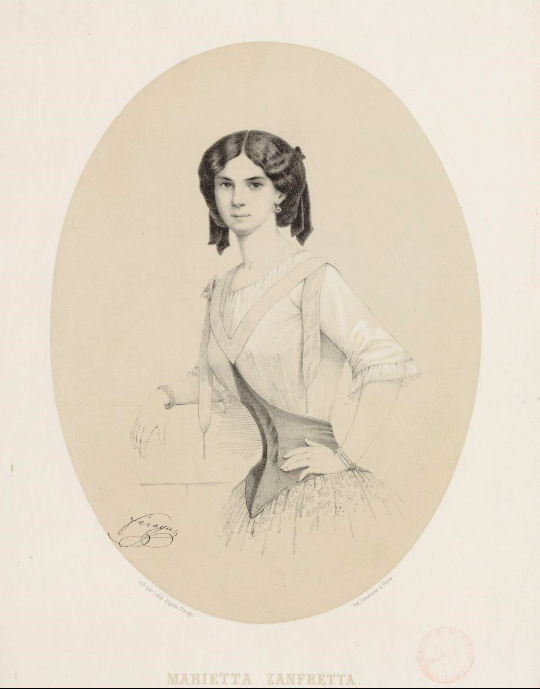
Marietta Zanfretta c1850

Marietta Zanfretta (31 August 1832 – 8 February 1898), known as Madame Siegrist, was an Italian tightrope dancer who found success in the United States. One of the greatest female tight-rope dancers in the world, she was known for performing en pointe on the tightrope, a rare feat.

== Early life ==
She was born as Marie Catherine Charlotte Marietta Zanfretta in 1832 in Venice, Austrian Empire in Italy into a family of tightrope performers and acrobats in northern Italy. The oldest of eleven children, her parents were Jeanne Giovanna née Catania (1814–1875) and Barthélémy Bartholomé Bartholoméo Zanfretta (1809–1893), an acrobat. As a child she had received tightrope, acrobatic and ballet training, performing with her parents and siblings in circuses in Europe including in Franconi's Theatre in Paris.

In 1852 she was in the United States where she appeared as a featured rider with E. F. and J. Mabie's Circus before performing for Den Stone's Circus in 1854. In about 1855 the Zanfettta family were hired as part of the troupe of performers of Antoine Ravel (1812–1872) with whom Marietta Zanfretta also did solo and ensemble dancing. She quickly became popular with audiences because of her beauty, charm and skill on the tightrope on which she performed en pointe in addition to doing pirouettes and somersaults. For the Ravel Troupe the Zanfrettas played 300 performances at Niblo's Garden in New York during 1857–59. As her father's joints began to stiffen with age, and finding himself unable to perform, he returned to Paris where, because of his physique, he became an artists' model.

== Performing career ==
After her booking with Ravel ended Zanfretta appeared in variety and theatres where she performed her signature tightrope descent. She toured the United States with the Caron and Ravel troupes which included the trapeze artists François and Auguste Siegrist and appeared at The Boston Theatre in Boston (1858). In that year she had a severe fall from which she soon recovered and resumed performing. With the Zanfretta Troupe she also performed in a number of circuses across the United States including in an equestrian act in which she danced and balanced on the back of a horse as it circled the ring. She also appeared with her brothers, with the clown Alexander Zanfretta (1830–1899) regularly appearing on playbills with her.

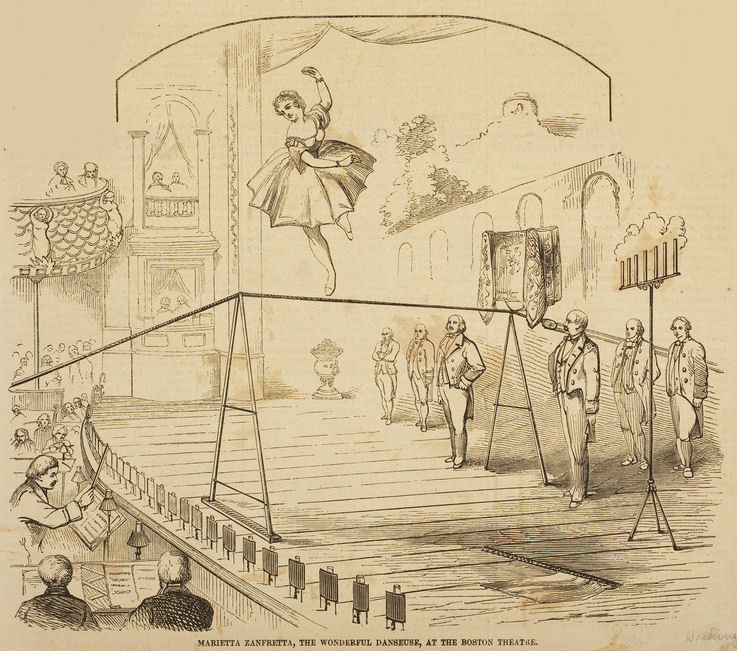
Marietta Zanfretta performing at The Boston Theatre - drawing by Benjamin Champney for Ballou's Pictorial (1858)

Of her performance at The Boston Theatre in Boston in 1858 Ballou's Pictorial reported:

MARIETTA ZANFRETTA, THE CELEBRATED TIGHT-ROPE DANCER

The design given on this page was sketched for us by Mr. Champney, from one of the proscenium boxes of the Boston Theatre, during the performance of Marietta Zanfretta, now attached to the Ravel Troupe, and one of the greatest female tight-rope dancers in the world. La Zanfretta is very young–only twenty-one– and very pretty, with those black, lustrous Italian eyes that pierce like an arrow. Her form is exquisitely symmetrical, and while the exercises of her speciality have strengthened her muscles, they have not impaired its grace. Her movements are as lithe as those of a panther. She never uses the balance-pole, but poises herself on the rope without any adventitious aid.

She performs the same feats on the corde tendue, which we think surprising in a dancer on the firm floor. She runs backwards and forwards, turning with incredible rapidity, dances on the rope, stands on the point of one toe, descends the angle of the rope into the parterre, and re-ascends unfaltering and fearless. Indeed her doings are unexampled. She would, like Madame Saqui, have ascended from the stage to the gallery, had she been permitted by the management.

Zanfretta is a Venetian by birth. Her parents pursued the same line, and her earliest steps were on the rope. It is thus only that such confidence, ease and grace could have been attained. The various great theatres of continental Europe have been the scenes of her ambition and triumphant displays, and she was the star of Franconi's, in Paris. She debuted in this country at Niblo's, and created the greatest enthusiasm by her performances. Her first appearance in Boston was a complete triumph. The first sight of her performances creates an uneasy sensation of extreme danger, but her perfect aplomb and self-possession soon banish that feeling, and your anxiety is lost in admiration of the witching and wonderful display.

Undoubtedly the extraordinary skill of Zanfretta is owing partly to her coming of a race of rope-dancers, for aptitude for particular exercises is unquestionably transmissible, and it is very possible to be "to the manor born."

She appeared with Orton & Older (1859–60) and in 1860 she appeared for 'Dr.' Gilbert R. Spalding and Charles J. Rogers at the Bowery Theatre in New York and appeared on the road for them in 1861, when she was billed as: 'Senorita Marietta Zanfretta, the Venetian rope dancer, and most brilliant star of the Ravel Troupe, during their last visit to America. This talented young lady exhibits in remarkable degree the grace, beauty and elegance, for which the belles of her native country have long been celebrated, while her wonderful exploits upon the tight rope, without the aid of balance pole, baffle description, and have challenged the admiration of assembled thousands in the theatre of the old and new world.' In Leavenworth in Kansas where the local newspaper described her as "a miracle of grace and skill on the tight rope", such was her charm that even when performances went awry the audience applauded. Here, when she had another slight fall from the wire "...what at first appeared a contre temps, the fall of the beautiful Marietta Zanfretta from the rope into the parquette, was so gracefully and skillfully gotten over by the charming danseuse, that the sympathy and applause of the large audience was accorded her, so vociferously, indeed, that we have a lingering suspicion that the fall was only another French coup d'etat of this Napoleon of tight rope performers, to take the house by storm." In 1862 she performed with the Ravel troupe at the National Theatre in Boston while in 1863 it was announced that she would walk across Niagara Falls on a tightrope. She was at Lent's Equescurriculum (1864) and the Hippotheatron in New York (1864). In November 1865 she was at Tony Pastor's Opera House in New York while she spent the Winter of 1865 to 1866 at the National Circus in the New American Theatre in Philadelphia.

With her brother Alexander and her husband François Siegrist with his brother and Auguste they made up a touring troupe of pantomimists and acrobats. In 1866 the Zanfretta Troupe, composed of Alexandre and Marietta Zanfretta, Siegrist brothers and members of the Caron family of entertainers took over the lease of the Olympic Theatre in New Orleans.

== Later years ==
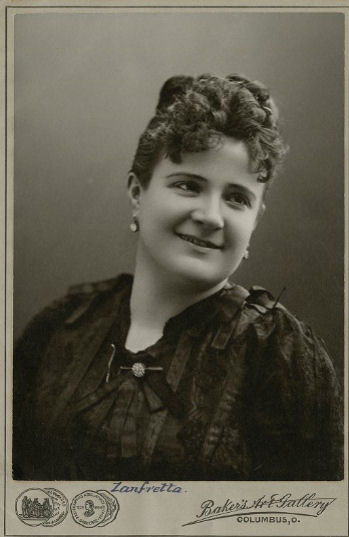
Marietta's sister Augustine Zanfretta - Baker Art Gallery c1898

In 1871 she was performing with Van Amburgh & Co. With her husband and fellow trapeze artist François 'Frank' Laurens Prosper Siegrist (1828–1878), a French clown, gymnast and acrobat whom she met in New Orleans she had a daughter, Léopoldine Anneta Siegrist (1863–1919). They adopted a number of children from the New York Foundling Asylum who they trained to form a juvenile troupe of acrobats. These were: Fanny Siegrist; Blanche Siegrist; William 'Willie' Siegrist; Thomas 'Toto' Siegrist, and Louis Siegrist. During one show it was said that one of the babies replaced the globe traditionally turned by the feet of the acrobat until the New York Society for the Prevention of Cruelty to Children swooped on the act and the baby was replaced by the globe. The infants were retired from the act until they reached a greater growth. The boys later performed as the 'Three Siegrist Brother', but they were only brothers by adoption. After the death of her husband in Paris in 1878 from heart trouble she married François 'Frank' Victor Kenebel in New York in 1883. Later she formed her own family troupe with her daughter and adopted sons and continued to perform in public until 1880, with her last appearance being with Orrin Bros.’ in Havana during which she had a fall, which convinced her the time had come to give up her acrobatic career.

Marietta Zanfretta died in February 1898 in New York. She was survived by her husband, her daughter and her adopted children.

== Gallery ==
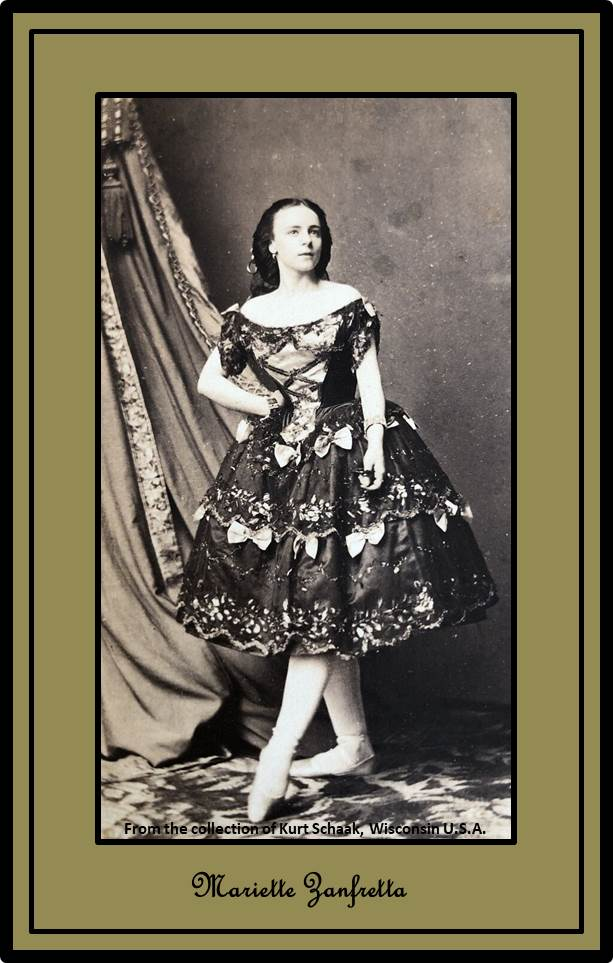
Marietta Zanfretta c 1860's, New York, U.S.A., while performing with the Ravel Family
