= List of photographers of stage and film =

This is a list of photographers of stage and film.

- Alfred Cheney Johnston
- Baker Art Gallery
- Bruno Bernard
- Cecil Beaton
- Elliott & Fry
- George Hurrell
- James J. Kriegsmann
- José María Mora
- Léopold-Émile Reutlinger
- Florence Vandamm
- Nadar
- Julius Cornelius Schaarwächter
