= The Greatest Show on Earth =

The Greatest Show on Earth may refer to:

== Arts, entertainment, and media ==
=== Circus ===
- Dan Rice's circus (1830s–1860s) was first described by an Arkansas paper as the "Greatest Show on Earth"
- The tagline of Ringling Bros. and Barnum & Bailey Circus
  - The Greatest Showman, a fictionalized depiction of the life of P. T. Barnum
    - "The Greatest Show", a song from the film

=== Music ===
- The Greatest Show on Earth (band), a British band from the early 1970s
- "The Greatest Show on Earth" (song), a 2026 song by U2
- "The Greatest Show on Earth", a song by Sparks on the 1980 album Terminal Jive
- "The Greatest Show on Earth", a song by metal band Machinae Supremacy
- "The Greatest Show on Earth", a song by Suggs on the 1998 album The Three Pyramids Club
- "The Greatest Show on Earth", a song by metal band Nightwish on the 2015 album Endless Forms Most Beautiful
- "Greatest Show on Earth", a song by Michael Jackson on the 1972 Ben album
- "Greatest Show on Earth", by Gucci Mane from the 2016 album The Return of East Atlanta Santa
- "Greatest Show on Earth", by Kid Rock from the 2017 album Sweet Southern Sugar
- The Weather Show, a segment of the Schoolhouse Rock! series, originally titled "The Greatest Show on Earth"

=== Other arts, entertainment, and media ===
- The Greatest Show on Earth (play), a 1938 American play by Vincent Duffey and Irene Alexander
- The Greatest Show on Earth (film) (1952), an American drama film produced and directed by Cecil B. DeMille
- The Greatest Show on Earth (TV series), a 1963 television series starring Jack Palance and based on the above film
- The Greatest Show on Earth: The Evidence for Evolution (2009), a book by British ethologist and evolutionary biologist Richard Dawkins
- The Greatest Show on Earth World Tour, a 2027 concert tour by U2

== See also ==
- The Greatest Show on Turf, nickname for the 1999–2001 St. Louis Rams
