= Cyrille Dion =

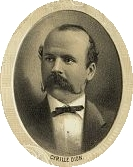
- Portraiture detail from 1874 poster, "The Billiard Monarchs".
- Born: Cyrille Dion; 1 March 1843; Montreal
- Died: October 2, 1878; Montreal
- Other names: "The Bismarck of Billiards"
- Occupation: Professional cue sports player
- Known for: • Champion of Canada in 1865; • World champion at American four-ball billiards in 1875; • Winner of the first Championship of America at pool in 1878.

Cyrille Dion (March 1, 1843 – October 2, 1878), sometimes called "the Bismarck of Billiards", was a top player of both carom billiards and pool during his era. Hailing from Montreal, Dion was champion of Canada in 1865. He won the last American four-ball billiards championship, held in 1873. After three-ball billiards came into vogue, he won the world championship at straight rail in 1875, and three years later, the first Championship of America at pool in 1878. He died just six months later at age 35.

== Tournament for the Championship of Canada ==
Dion took first place at the 1865 Tournament for the Championship of Canada, held June 15–19 of that year at Mechanic's Hall in Montreal. It was a round robin championship at American four-ball billiards with matches to 500 points. Dion went undefeated, with a 5–0 record (tournament results shown below), and won a gold-mounted cue for his efforts.

Players	Games won	Games lost	Total points	Grand Average	Best Winning Average	Best Run
Cyrille Dion	5	0	2,500	12.76-202	20	138
William Jakes	4	1	2,136	7.92-292	8.28-59	70
Samuel May	3	2	2,295	8.103-274	12.20-40	130
Amadee Guillett	2	3	2,056	6.160-316	7.3-71	62
James Rooney	1	4	1,730	7.50-336	4.96-101	44
Henry McVittie	0	5	1,529	4.281-312	...	70

== Tournament of State and Provincial Champions ==
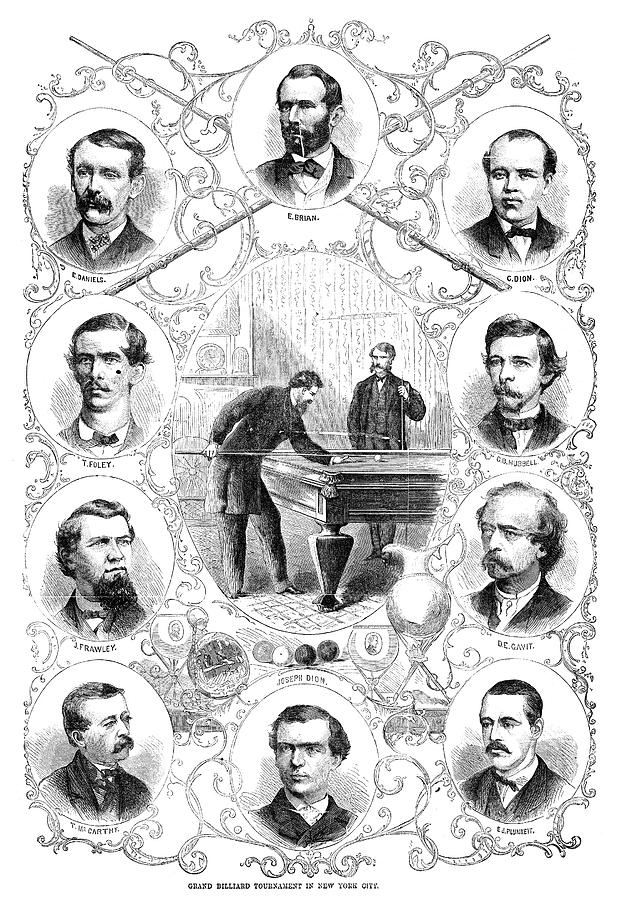
Grand Billiard Tournament in New York City, Harper's Weekly 1866

In 1866, Dion participated in the Tournament of State and Provincial Champions, held at the Hippotheatron in New York City on September 15 of that year. This was a round robin tournament at American four ball billiards, with races to 500 points. Dion repeated his performance of the previous year at the Tournament for the Championship of Canada, going undefeated and also winning a gold mounted cue (results shown below). The value of the cue is not known, but the second place prize was a billiard table, so it was presumably of considerable value.

Players	Games won	Games lost	Best Single Average	Best Run	Total points	Grand Average
Cyrille Dion	6	1	25	127	3,461	11.282-289
Edward J. Plunkett	5	2	16.4-31	117	3,295	11.28-297
Edward Daniels	3	4	15.5-33	80	2,885	9.113-308
Timothy McCarthy	5	2	14.10-35	99	3,290	10.10-328
Thos. Foley	3	4	16.20-30	134	2,861	10.1-286
John Frawley	1	5	8.12-61	141	2,451	8.91-295
Gershom B. Hubbell	3	4	9.41-51	98	3,252	8.196-382
A. H. Harrison	1	5	11.5-45	132	2,398	9.193-245

== Diamond Championship of America ==
On June 1, 1870, A. P. Rudolphe, of Chicago, and Dion, played American four ball billiards for the championship of America for a purse of $1,000 a side, and a diamond champion cue. The Hippotheatron, a circus building on Fourteenth street in New York City, opposite Irving place, was selected as the scene of battle. Over 3,000 spectators were in attendance and the stage was set with a single table on a temporary platform erected for the match. Rudolphe was the eventual winner in a close match, scoring 1,500 to Dion's 1,485. Rudolphe did not hold the Diamond Title long. On June 17, 1870, in a rematch, Dion beat Rudolphe 1,500 to 1479 at the same game and on the same terms. Another rematch between Dion and Rudolphe for the Championship of America was played on December 28, 1870, at the Academy of Music in New York City. The format was American four ball billiards to 2,000 points and a $2,000 prize. There were at least 2,000 spectators in attendance. Dion was ultimately awarded the win before the end, having what was judged by the referees an indomitable lead by the 90th inning of 409 points.

The next challenger to Dion's title for the Championship of America and the diamond title was Frank Parker. The match was held in Chicago (Parker's home city) at the Crosby Opera House on April 27, 1871, in front of an audience of 1,500, which included at least 200 women. Dion prevailed again with a final score of 1,501 over Parker's 1,164. Dion defended his title again on June 20, 1871, at New York Hippotheatron against Melvin Foster. Dion won in sixty-one innings, scoring 1,500 to Foster's 616. Dion's highest runs were 186 and 165; Foster's, 96 and 60.

== [First pool] Championship of America ==
The first Championship of America at pool took place in 1878 at the Union Square Billiard Rooms in New York City. The game played was fifteen-ball pool (sometimes called 61-pool). Despite being defunct for over 100 years, the rules of that game are still listed in the Billiard Congress of America's Official Rules and Record Book. In it, the number of the ball pocketed by a player scores the player that number of points. The first player to count 61 or more points (being more than half of the total of all the ball numbers combined) wins a "frame". The championship was played on a race-to-21-frames format. Dion won the championship on April 20, 1878, beating out Gotthiel Wahlstrom of Sweden, 11 frames to 7, and received the title of Champion of America at pool, a gold medal and a cash prize. Dion did not retain the title for long. Shortly after the tournament he was challenged by Wahlstrom to a rematch and was defeated.

== Stakes matches ==
On October 19, 1865, Dion was slated to play R.E. Wilmarth at Bumstead Hall in Boston at American four ball billiards. Wilmarch forfeited and Edward Daniels was substituted on the original terms, which were stakes of $250 a side, in gold. Dion won 1,500 to 728, averaging 16.28-92 and had a high run of 157. Michael Phelan refereed the match. Later that year on November 8, Dion played John McDevitt in New York City's Cahill's Billiards Room for a purse of $250 at American four ball billiards. Dion received a handicap of 300 points and was defeated 1,500 to 1,059. McDevitt averaged 19.56-76 to Dion's 10.9-75. On December 18, 1867, Dion again played Edward Daniels, again at Bumstead Hall in Boston, with similar results. Dion won $250 with a final score of 1,000 to 770. He averaged 11.65-85 to Daniels' 9.14-84.

On April 6, 1869, Dion concluded a three-day challenge match with Melvin Foster in Montreal's Mechanic's Hall at American four ball billiards, beating Foster in the last match 1,200 to 1,118 for $1,000 a side. On May 10, 1869, Dion played John McDevitt for $500 at New York's Irving Hall for $500 at straight rail to 300 points. Dion triumphed, with McDevitt needing just one point.

== Fraternal rivalry and support ==
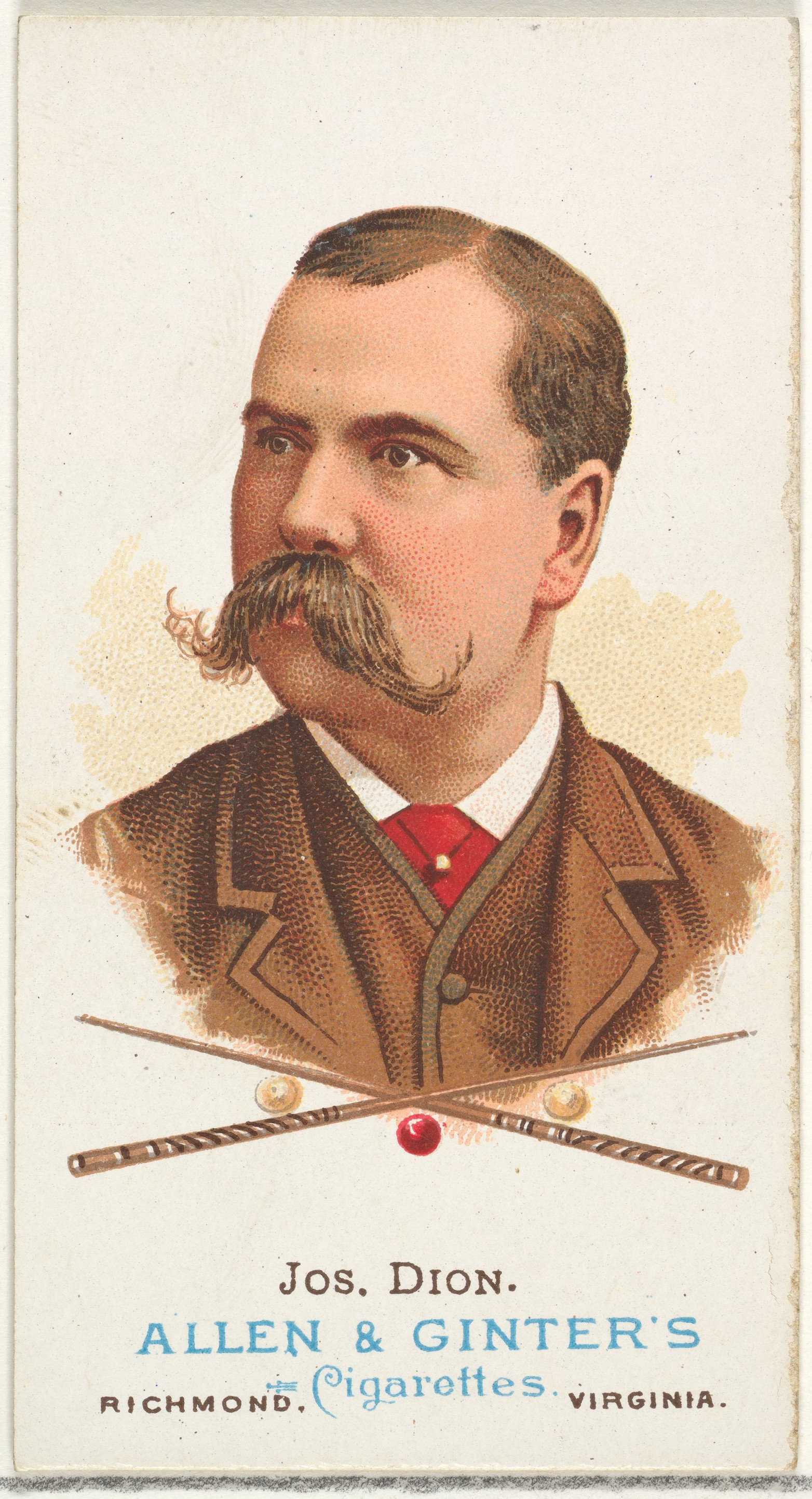
Cigarette card of Joseph Dion.

Cyrille Dion had an older brother, Joseph, also a top player; the brothers sometimes played matched against each other as well as teaming up against others. On July 21, 1870, Joseph lost to Cyrille in a 750-point match at American four ball billiards to 750 points, held at Captain Boyle's Astor Billiard Room in New York City (corner of Barclay Street and Broadway). Cyrille was the winner with a final score of 750 to 557. Another fraternal match was played on September 15, 1870, in American four ball billiards, again to 750 points. The match played out at Nell Bryant's billiard hall in New York City (Broadway and 32nd street), with a large assemblage of well known billiard patrons present. Cyrille beat his brother by over 300 points. The brothers switched to straight rail then, playing to 100 points; Joseph came out on top, 100 to 83. On April 10, 1871, the brothers formed a team and played scotch doubles against A. P. Rudolphe and John Deery at Platt's Hall in San Francisco. The format was American four ball billiards to 2,000 points, with $1,000 staked by both teams. The Dions were the victors, 2,000 to 1,560.

== Challenge to the world ==
Fresh from multiple successful defenses of his title as Champion of America at the diamond title, as reported by the Fort Wayne Daily Gazette on July 18, 1871, "Cyrille Dion has issued a notice in which he challenges anyone in the world to play him a game of three ball or French carom, billiards, the amount of stakes to be not less than five hundred dollar a side. It is thought in billiard circles that an International contest will be the result of this challenge."

== Death ==
Dion died of congestion of the lungs at his mother's home in Montreal on October 2, 1878. He had been afflicted with a lingering severe cold for three years, and had spent several months in warmer climes with the hope of recovering his health. Shortly before his death he left New York City to visit his mother and rest under her care, but caught a fresh cold during his train trip in a sleeper car, and died soon after reaching his mother's home. He was 35 years old.
