= Patty Astley =

British equestrian and circus performer

Patty Astley (1741–1814) was an English equestrian and circus performer. She was wife to Philip Astley who is regarded as "the father of modern circus".

== Early life and education ==
Martha Mary Polly Jones was born in 1741 in Flintshire.

== Career ==
Patty and her husband put on their first public show on Easter Monday, 4 April 1768. Patty's act included military riding manoeuvres, standing astride two horses, and performing handstands on a moving horse, as well as the unique and unusual act of riding with "a swarm of bees [...] on her arm, imitating a Lady's Muff". She was advertised as "the only one of her sex" and her husband Phillip Astley is quoted, at the time, as introducing her as the conclusion or finale of one particular show: "When you have seen all my bill exprest, My Wife, to conclude, performs the rest".

In 1772, the couple performed for the French king, Louis XV, at Fountainbleau castle.

Scholar Vanessa Toulmin states that Patty Astley is an important figure to be "deliberately reintroduced into the text as part of a reshaping of the originating narrative of circus".

== Personal life and death ==
She married Philip Astley on 8 July 1765 in London. Their only child, John, was born 2 years later. He performed in the circus from the age of 5.

Astley died in 1803. She was 61.
