= Marie Macarte =

English equestrian and circus performer

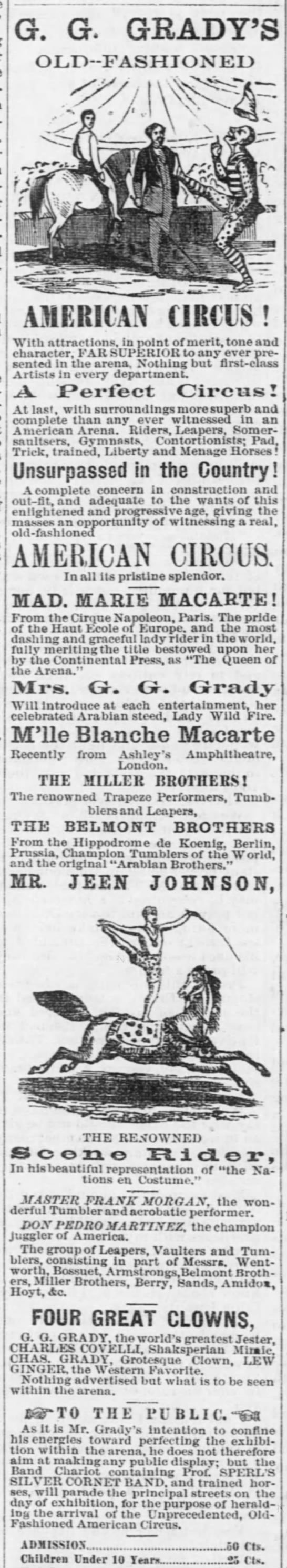
Advert for G. G. Grady's Old-Fashioned Circus (1870)

Marie Elizabeth Macarte (1827 –20 September 1892) was an English equestrian and circus performer who found success in Britain and the United States in the 1840s to 1860s.

== Early life and career ==
Born in her mother's hometown of Leigh-on-Sea in Essex in 1827 as Marie Elizabeth Ginnett, she was the daughter of Ann née Partridge (1803–1877) and the circus performer Jean Pierre Ginnett (1798–1861). Her older brother was John Frederick Ginnett (1825–1892), who later was the proprietor of Ginnett's Circus. A distant relative was the lion-tamer Thomas Macarte who was killed in the ring in 1872. Marie Ginnett was a pupil of Andrew Ducrow and started performing as Miss Ginnett when she was about three years old. In 1841 she married Michael 'John' Macarthy, an equestrian artiste performing with her father and later a vaulter, tumbler and acrobat who had performed at Astley's Royal Amphitheatre in London and who was a member of the Macarte dynasty of acrobats and circus performers who claimed to have been performing since the early 18th century. With Michael Macarthy her children were: Marie Louise Macarthy (1848–); Adelaide Macarthy (1850–1930); Frederick Macarthy (1852–), a high wire and general circus performer who later had a performing dog and monkey act; Henry Macarthy (1853–1924); Blanche Macarthy (1855–), and Kate Macarthy (1856–).

Marie Macarte made her American début in 1842, and in October 1845 she was with Howe's Circus, with the critic of the New York Daily Herald writing of her:

"But what shall we say of Madame Macarte? - the most graceful and beautiful female equestrian of the age. Nature formed her in one of its happiest moods, as her physique would be a good study for a sculptor. Her act of horsemanship is of the most daring and brilliant description, while her attitudes in almost every variety of grace, charm and fascinate. She rivets the attention of the whole audience, and the eye is dazzled in following the mazy of her beautiful and fantastic evolutions. Now she looks the Hindoostanee shawl girl to perfection–and now the pious nun–again she changes into a voluptuous Sultana, and then transforms herself into the happiest peasant girl of vine-encircled France. But her riding must be seen to be appreciated."

She went on to perform with Sands, Lent & Co Circus (1847) followed by the Welch & Delavan Circus (1847). The proprietors of Welch and Delavan had entered into an expensive written agreement with the Macartes, paying them a weekly salary of $100 plus expenses, supplying two horses for Marie Macarte's carriage and paying her a third of a benefit at each venue where she performed. In return Welch & Delavan would receive one of her horses and the right to use her name in any publicity for their circus while she was appearing with them. They had spent $2,000 in printing bills and posters announcing her performances throughout the tour. However, the Macartes broke the agreement by leaving to join "Dr" Gilbert R. Spalding's Monster Circus, which was performing just ahead of Welch & Delavan at the same venues where they were booked to appear. The Macartes for their part stated that they had left because the conduct of Mr. Delavan had made Marie Macarte "very uncomfortable and unhappy." The ruling was that as the Macartes had entered into an agreement for personal services it was not enforceable in law. In 1848 she performed at the Vauxhall Gardens in London and at Astley's Amphitheatre in 1849.

Back in Britain, from 28 January to 2 February 1850 she was with Franconi's Circus in Birmingham, before embarking on an extensive tour of the provinces touring from 1850 to 1853 as "the only real troupe of lady equestrians" with her and her husband's newly-formed Macarte and Bell's Grand American Circus - actually quite a small circus by the standards of the time - which was owned by her husband Michael Macarthy, his brother Dan and Dick Bell. In 1853 their circus was joined by the famous clown Thomas Barry.

== Success in America ==
On crossing the Atlantic Macarte toured with the Nixon-Macarte Circus in Washington D.C. (1863); 'the fearless and graceful equestrian, Mme. Marie Macarte' was with James M. Nixon's Alhambra Circus in New York City (1863); the Hippotheatron in New York City (1864); Rivers & Derious Circus in Washington D.C. (1864); the National Circus in Cincinnati (1864–65), and Frank Howes (1866), Palmer's (1866); Mike Lipman's (1866–67); Haight & Chambers Circus (1867); Michael O'Connor's Circus (1869); Stowe & Norton Circus (1869), and G. G. Grady's Old-Fashioned Circus (1870).

In her bare horseback act she jumped over ribbons, leapt through paper balloons, and performed a scarf dance. A new feature she introduced a new feature to the circus ring was that of performing scenes from mythology along with her riding act, which originated from Ducrow's work in England. Her act, which included broad and high leaps and mock sword fights on horseback was considered new and novel for the time.

== Later years ==
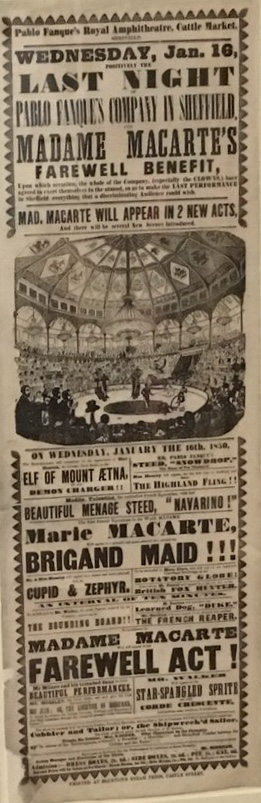
Poster for Madame Macarte's farewell tour

After the death of her husband Michael Macarte at Ipswich in 1856 she married George Clark at Cranbrook, Kent on 11 September 1856. Her children with him were: Georgina Clark (1858-); George Clark (1859–) and Charles Clark (1860–). Clark was killed in an accident at sea in 1863 while returning from the United States when he fell down a cargo hatch. She married Daniel Rhodes (real name Rose, d. 13 February 1890), a veteran advertiser and manager, in Harrison, Texas on 9 March 1868.

Marie Macarte retired in 1874 to found an equestrian and gymnastic furnishing business for the sale of all equipment needed for circus acts. In 1879 her four daughters Marie Louise, Adelaide, Blanche and Kate Macarthy formed a circus in their own right in the United States as the Macarte Sisters Parisian Circus. Her daughter Adelaide Macarte married Hubert Cooke, an equestrian performer who was killed in the ring while performing with the Circus Strepetow in Odessa in 1917.

Marie Macarte died in New York in 1892.

Her granddaughters were the acrobats and high-wire act the Macarte Sisters.
