= Nathans Circus =

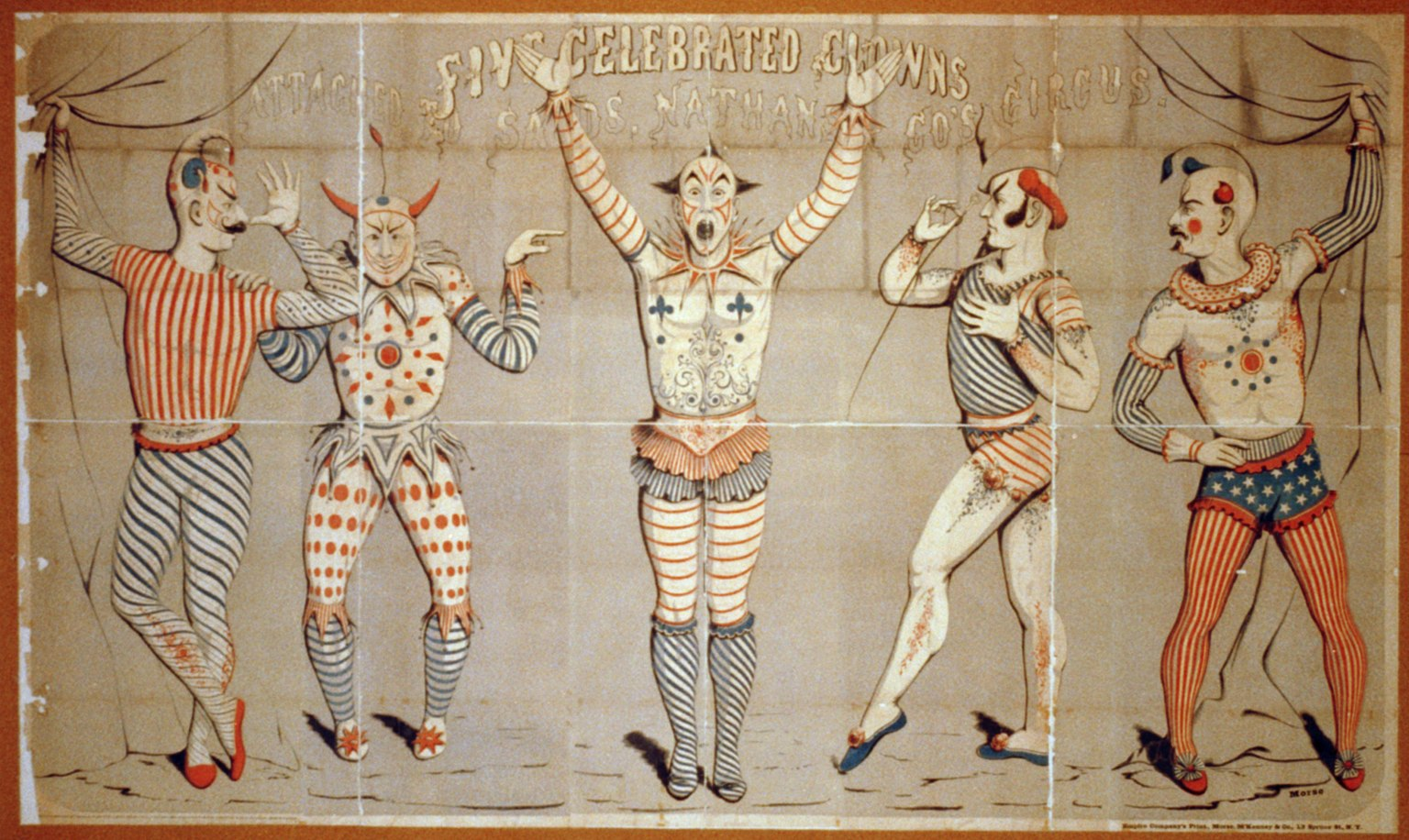
- Five celebrated clowns, Nathans Co's Circus

Origin
- Year founded: 1850 (circa)

Information
- Type of acts: Colonel Routh Goshen

Nathans Circus, also known as Welch & Nathans' Circus, was a series of circuses operated by the Nathans family in the 1850s. His acts included the Colonel Routh Goshen and Marie Macarte.

== Circuses ==
- 1843 - Welch & Mann
- 1844 to 1846 - Welch, Mann & Delavan
- 1847 - Welch & Delavan
- 1848 to 1850 - Welch, Delavan & Nathans
- 1851 - Welch & Nathans
