= Dan Rice =

American entertainer (1824–1900)

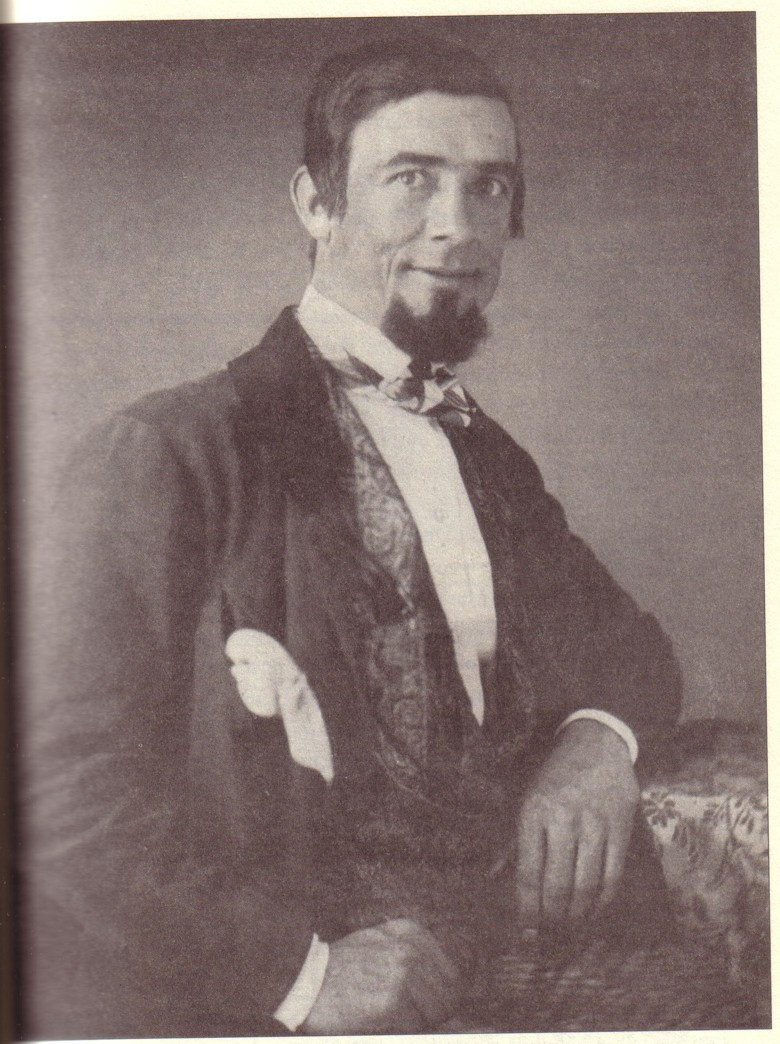
- Dan Rice, circa 1840s
- Born: Daniel McLaren; January 23, 1823; New York City, US
- Died: February 22, 1900 (aged 77)
- Burial place: West Long Branch, New Jersey, US

Dan Rice (January 23, 1823 – February 22, 1900) was an American entertainer of many talents, most famously as a clown, who was active before the American Civil War. At the height of his career, Rice was a household name. Dan Rice also coined the terms "One Horse Show" and "Greatest Show" while popularizing the barrel-style "French" cuff. He was a figure in the new American mass culture brought on by the technological changes of the Industrial Revolution. Rice ran for President of the United States in 1868. With changes in circus venues and popular culture after the Civil War, his fame has gradually slipped into such historical obscurity that in 2001 biographer David Carlyon called him "the most famous man you've never heard of".

== Biography ==
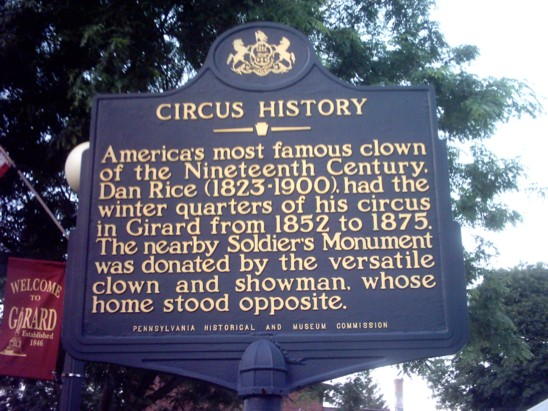
Sign about Rice in Girard Borough, Pennsylvania

Born Daniel McLaren in New York City, Rice became a circus clown, animal trainer, songwriter, commentator, circus strong man, actor, director, producer, dancer, and politician. He ran for Senate, House, and President of the United States, dropping out of each race.

Rice's uncle was a ringmaster for the Howes & Turner circus, organized in Salem, New York, in 1826. According to Rice himself, this was the first American circus to feature the canvas top that became so iconic. He traveled with this circus for 'several years' as a youngster. Rice innovatively combined animals, acrobats and clowns in a circus. He began performing in 1841, when he got a job of presenting a pig named Sybil whose tricks included a supposed ability to tell time. He moved on to singing and dancing, and briefly sang in blackface. Gaining fame and popularity, he changed styles once again; he starred in various parodies of works by William Shakespeare, including that of "Dan Rice's Version of Othello" and "Dan Rice's Multifarious Account of Shakespeare's Hamlet". He would perform these with various songs and dialects. "Rice was not simply funnier than other clowns; he was different, mingling jokes, solemn thoughts, civic observations, and songs." During the 1847–48 season he was working with the circus of Gilbert R. Spalding.

He began producing his own shows, and often had more than one tour going on at the same time. He then reinvented himself into a gentleman. He became involved in politics and would often have Democratic undertones in his shows. He won the affection of many newspapers and publicists, including those of a then unknown Mark Twain and Walt Whitman. Mark Twain paid him homage in his description of a circus in Adventures of Huckleberry Finn, and it is likely a boyhood Twain actually saw Rice perform when his circus came to Hannibal for a show.

His shows became more famous than any of the other shows touring at the time, including that of rival Phineas Taylor Barnum. He pioneered a vaudevillian style before there was vaudeville. He was very patriotic, later influencing the likes of George M. Cohan. He was also one of the main models for "Uncle Sam". He died almost penniless in 1900 and is buried in the Old First Methodist Church cemetery in West Long Branch, New Jersey.

The small town of Girard, Pennsylvania, where Rice had a home and lived for many years, also housed his circus animals. The town has a three-day festival dedicated to Dan Rice called "Dan Rice Days".

== Expressions ==
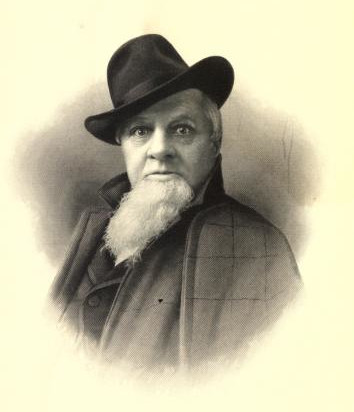
Dan Rice in his later years

A number of popular expressions came into being around Dan Rice.

- Rice campaigned for Zachary Taylor as president, inviting him to campaign on the circus bandwagon, whence the expression "to jump on the bandwagon".
- Early in his career, Rice was down on his luck and only had one horse (in early circuses the core show was a horse show). His competitors mocked him, saying it was a "one horse show" as a derogatory. Rice was able to turn the expression around by putting on a good show, and it became famously attached to him for the rest of his life.
- The rallying cry of "Hey, Rube!" – later transformed into a noun – originated in New Orleans in 1848 when a member of Rice's troupe was attacked by a mob and he yelled to his friend Reuben, "Hey, Rube!". The phrase is most commonly known today in the circus world as a "Hey, Rube" meaning "come help in this fight".
- Decades before other circuses used the phrase, an Arkansas paper praised Rice's as "The Greatest Show on Earth."

== See also ==
- G. L. Fox
