= Baker Art Gallery =

American photography studio

Baker's Art Gallery was a photography studio in Columbus, Ohio from 1862 to 1955. Among those to have their portraits taken were Kyrle Bellew, William McKinley, Rutherford B. Hayes, and Annie Oakley. They also won first place at various exhibitions, including the World's Columbian Exhibition.

== Background ==
Lorenzo Marvin Baker was born April 25, 1834, and came to Columbus, Ohio in 1854. He worked at the Neil House Hotel, and was an officer in the state penitentiary under Governor Chase, and served for a short time in the Union Army during the American Civil War. In 1862 he started a photography business and established a gallery.

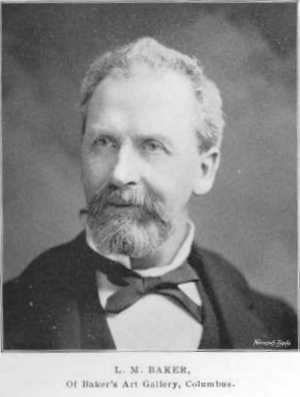
Lorenzo Baker, 1896

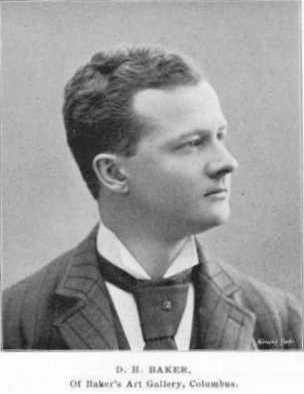
Duane Baker, 1896

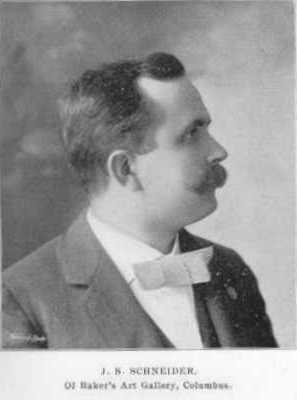
John Schneider, 1896

Baker took on his employee, John Samuel Schneider, (1860 - 1926), and his son, Duane Henry Baker, (1859 - 1934), as equal 1/3 partners in the business after the younger Baker graduated from Ohio State University and Schneider from Baldwin-Wallace College. They ran a highly successful business that included Presidents Hayes, McKinley, Taft, and Harding as clients. After the founder died in 1924, Duane Baker continued the business. Two more generations of the Baker family continued the business until 1955, when they donated their photos and negatives to the Ohio Historical Society.

== Locations ==
The gallery was located in the 1880s at 163 & 167 South High St., and later moved to 106 S. High Street, and 232 S. High Street. They moved to another location after 1939.

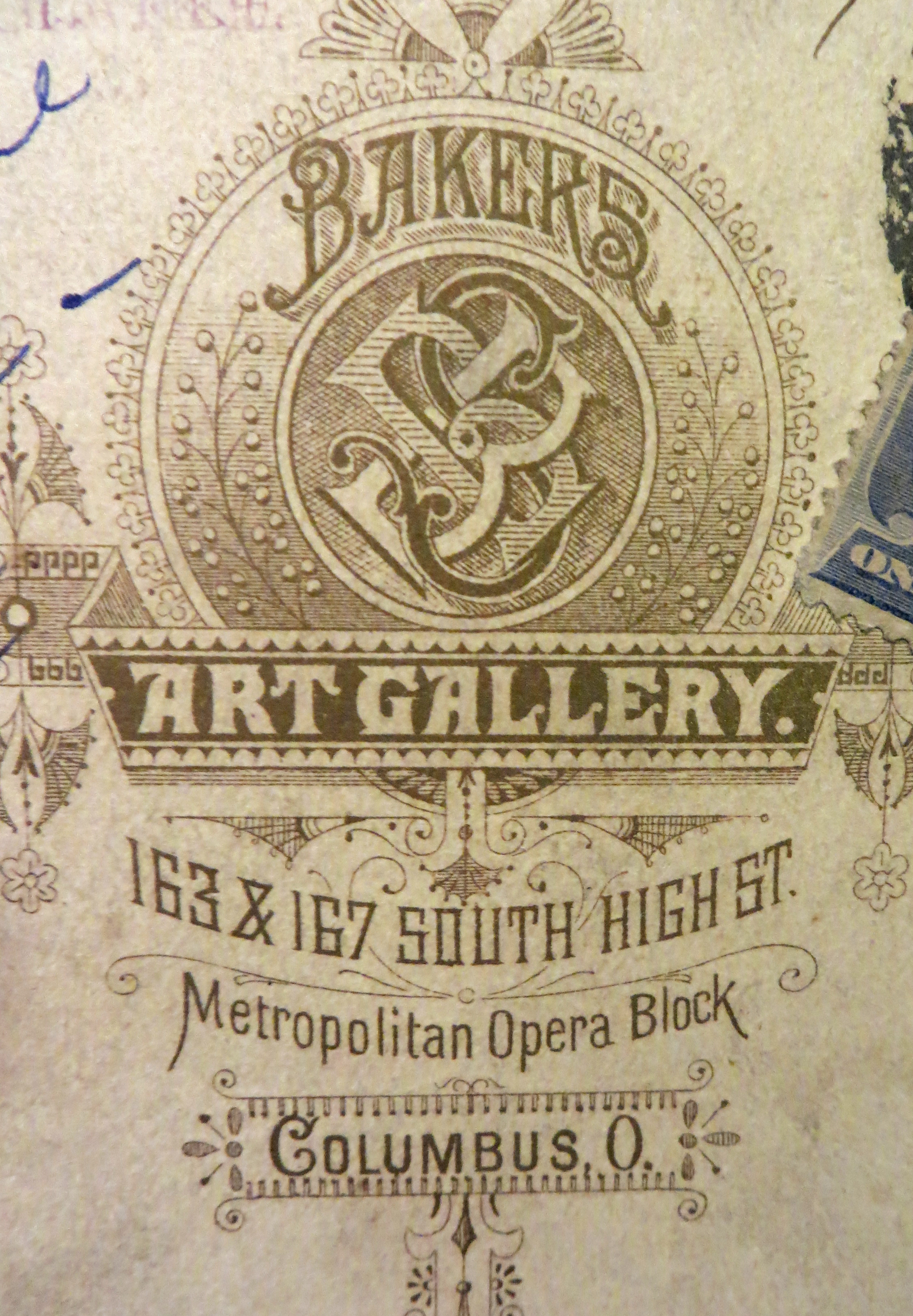
1880's Cabinet Card - Baker's Art Gallery, 163 & 167 South High St., Columbus, Ohio

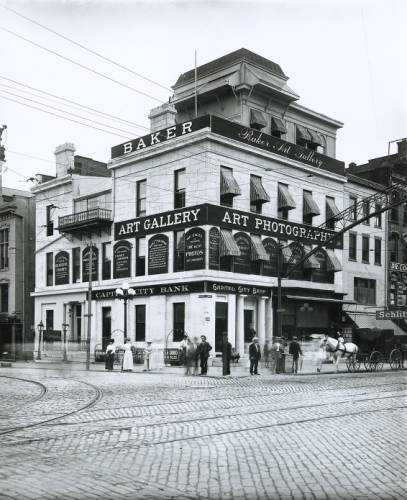
106 S. High Street, c. 1905

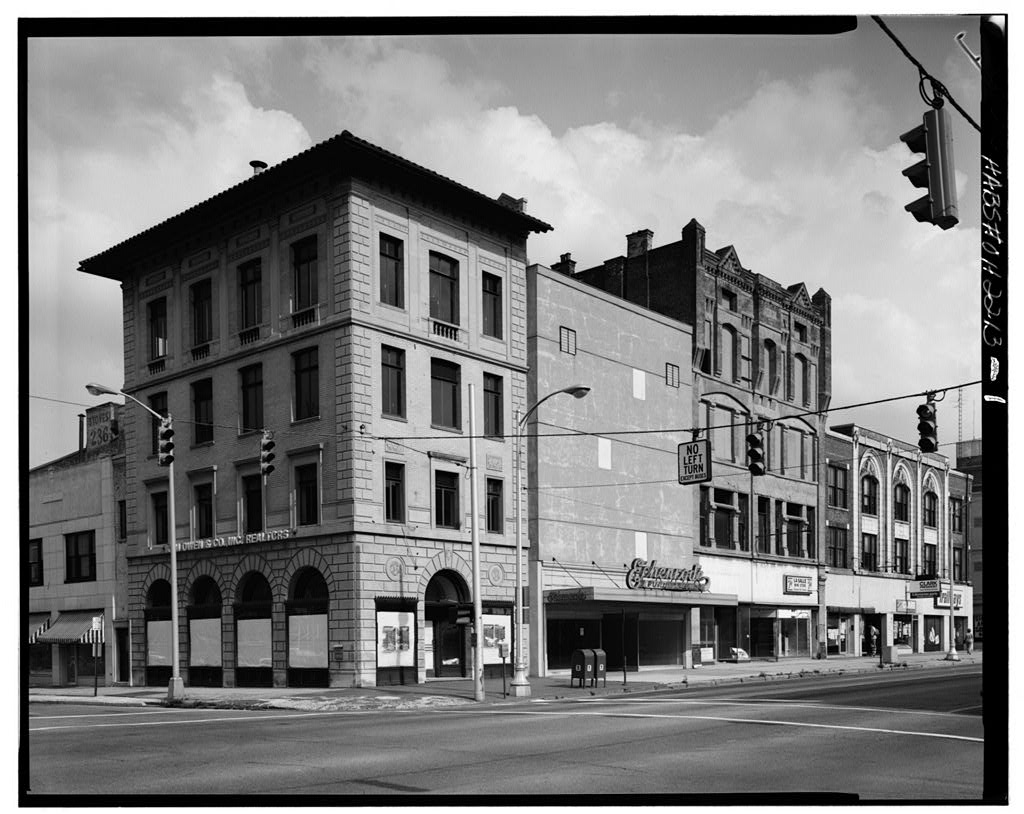
232 S. High Street, c. 1980

== Awards ==
John S. Schneider was president of the Photographers Association of America in 1895. The gallery won the Photographers Association of America Gold Medal in 1889, Chicago Worlds Fair, Highest Award, 1893, Photographer's Association of Germany, grand prize, 1897 and awards at the Ohio State Fair, beginning in 1874, for photographs plain and finished with watercolor and ink.
