= Circus Hall of Fame =

- Wallace Circus Winter Headquarters
- U.S. National Register of Historic Places
- U.S. National Historic Landmark
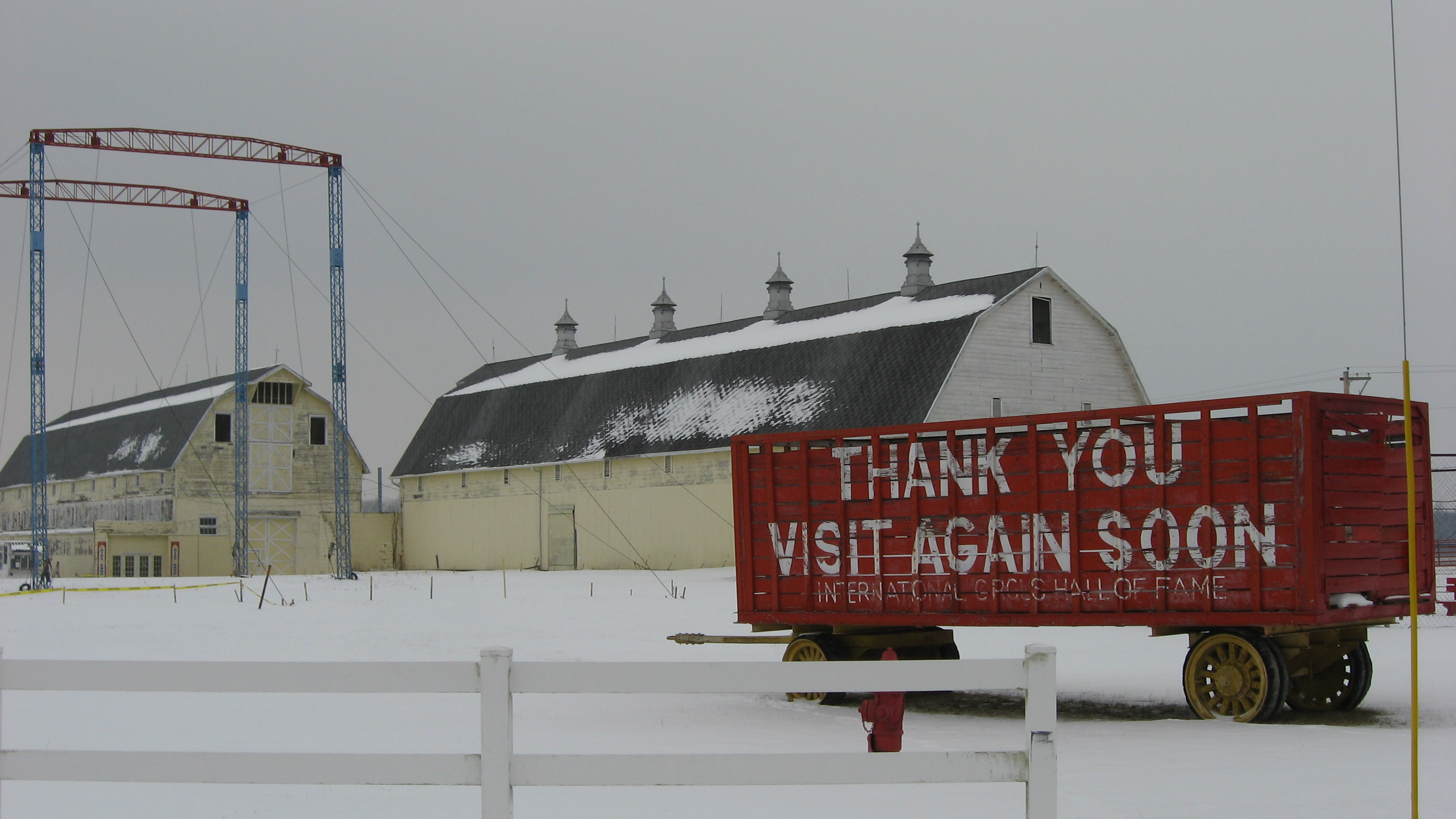
- Buildings and a circus wagon at the Hall of Fame

- Location within Indiana Location within the United States
- Nearest city: Peru, Indiana
- Coordinates: 40°45′16″N 86°1′11″W
- Area: 9 acres (3.6 ha)
- Built: 1892
- NRHP reference No.: 87000837

Significant dates
- Added to NRHP: February 27, 1987
- Designated NHL: February 27, 1987

The International Circus Hall of Fame is a museum and hall of fame that honors important figures in circus history. It is in Peru, Indiana, United States, on the former grounds of the Wallace Circus and American Circus Corporation Winter Quarters, also known as the Peru Circus Farm and Valley Farms. The property includes rare surviving circus buildings from the late 19th and early 20th centuries and was designated a National Historic Landmark for its historical importance.

== Property history ==
The Peru property was a prosperous farm when it was purchased in 1891 by Benjamin Wallace, owner of the Wallace Circus. From then until 1944, the property was the winter quarters for a series of circus companies, most created by succession or merger with Wallace's operation. In 1921, the American Circus Corporation acquired the property and Wallace's circus operation and expanded the facilities. American Circus was sold to John Ringling in 1929, and it housed Ringling Brothers operations until declines in the circus business prompted its closure in 1944. The property was then returned to agricultural use, and a number of the surviving circus-related buildings were significantly altered or demolished. The location was temporarily closed in January 2022 for repairs.

== Museum history ==
The Ringling Brothers Circus had established its winter quarters in Sarasota, Florida in 1927, with a large amount of help from Victor Sabattini (1916–2010), an insurance executive who later became the president and chairman of the board. In the mid-1950s, circus fans in the Sarasota community had the idea to create a hall of fame to honor outstanding circus artists, and in 1956, the Circus Hall of Fame opened. Located near the Sarasota airport, the hall of fame included exhibitions in several buildings filled with circus memorabilia, including personal belongings of famous circus artists and impresarios — costumes, props, posters and circus wagons. The Circus Hall of Fame also presented circus acts several times a day during several months each year.

In addition to visits by Florida tourists, the Circus Hall of Fame received national exposure. NBC-TV broadcast "The Circus Hall of Fame All Star Circus" on Sept. 12, 1970. The host, Ed McMahon, congratulated the four newly named inductees to the Circus Hall of Fame, including famous circus performers, The Rieffenach Sisters (bareback riders), aerialists Mayme Ward and Ira Millette, and circus impresario Billy Smart Sr.

Although up to 80,000 tourists visited the Circus Hall of Fame each year, by the late 1970s, it was unprofitable, and the owners prepared to close the museum. In 1980, the lease on the property expired, and on May 27, 1980, the Sarasota Circus Hall of Fame had its last performance.

In 1981 a group of citizens from Peru, Indiana, learned that the items from the Circus Hall of Fame were for sale. Interested in preserving the circus artifacts and concerned that they might be auctioned off separately, Indiana residents, businesses and the state government contributed to the purchase of the entire collection to bring it to the former Wallace property in Peru. Many other items have since been added to the original Sarasota collection, including 16 historical wagons reconstructed in the Hall of Fame wagon shop and the Peru Wagon Works Shop.

== Prominent inductees ==
- 1958 Lillian Leitzel
- 1960 William C. Coup
- 1960 James Anthony Bailey
- 1960 P. T. Barnum
- 1961 Bird Millman
- 1961 The Ringling Brothers
- 1962 Dan Rice
- 1962 Philip Lailson
- 1963 Adam Forepaugh
- 1963 May Wirth
- 1963 Victor Pépin
- 1964 Isaac Van Amburgh
- 1964 Philip Astley
- 1965 Clyde Beatty
- 1966 Con Colleano
- 1969 Mabel Stark
- 1970 Billy Smart Sr.
- 1971 Karl King
- 1972 Felix Adler
- 1972 George A. Hamid Sr.
- 1973 Otto Griebling
- 1974 Buffalo Bill Cody
- 1974 Tom Mix
- 1975 Merle Evans
- 1975 The Zacchini Brothers
- 1977 William Preston Hall
- 1979 The Wallenda Troupe
- 1980 Mollie Bailey
- 1981 The Albert Hodgini Troupe
- 1986 John Ringling North
- 1987 Irvin Feld
- 1987 Bertram Mills
- 1989 Lou Jacobs
- 1991 The Great Wilno
- 1994 Emmett Kelly
- 1996 Knie family
- 1997 Annie Oakley
- 1997 Thomas Taplin Cooke
- 1999 Gunther Gebel-Williams
- 2001 Elvin Bale
- 2003 Hugo Zacchini
- 2005 Miles White
- 2006 Kenneth Feld
- 2006 Francis Brunn
- 2009 Cecil B. DeMille
- 2009 Paul Binder
- 2010 Henry Ringling North
- 2011 Norman Barrett
- 2012 Freddie Freeman
- 2014 Terry Cavaretta
- 2016 Barry Lubin

== See also ==
- Hagenbeck-Wallace Circus
- Terrell Jacobs Circus Winter Quarters
- International Clown Hall of Fame
- Circusland
- List of museums in Indiana
- List of National Historic Landmarks in Indiana
- National Register of Historic Places listings in Miami County, Indiana
