= International Clown Hall of Fame =

Museum in Baraboo, Wisconsin, United States

Coordinates: 43.47133°N 89.74270°W

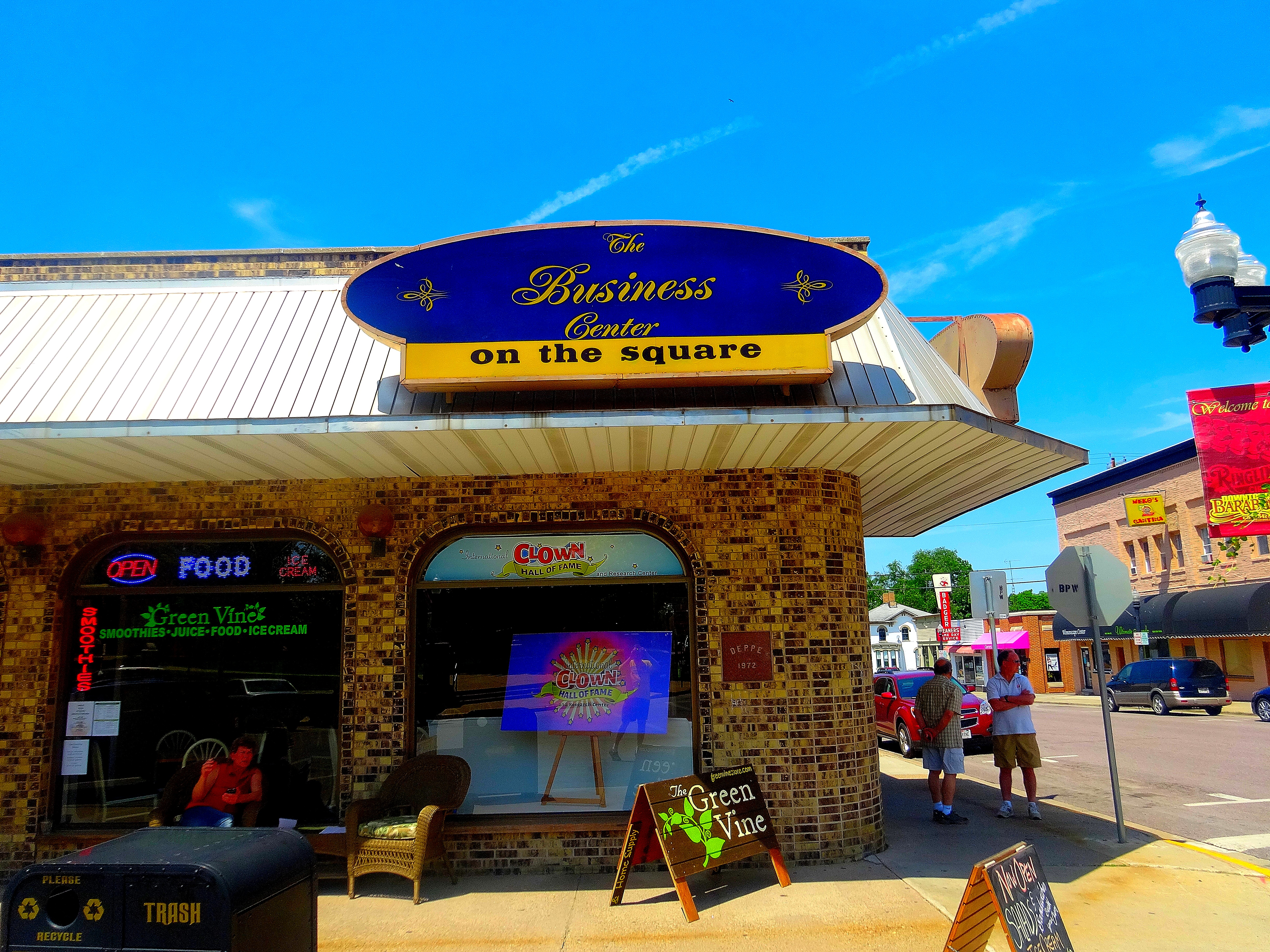
International Clown Hall of Fame

The International Clown Hall of Fame and Research Center (ICHOF), located in Baraboo, Wisconsin, United States, is dedicated to the preservation and advancement of clown art and achievement. Represented by professional and amateur clown associations, it pays tribute to outstanding clown performers, operates a museum of clowning with resident clown performers, conducts special events, and maintains a national archive of clown artifacts and history.

== History ==
The ICHOF was founded in Delavan, Wisconsin, the birthplace of the Barnum and Bailey Circus, in 1986. It was created as community development project by Gareth Thomas Betts of the University of Wisconsin–Extension and Jennie Schilz Thompson, director of the Delavan Chamber of Commerce to build on the city's circus history. The induction process began in 1988, and was headed by Richard Snowberg, the founder and director of Clown Camp during his tenure as a professor at University of Wisconsin–La Crosse. The first event followed the affiliation of the four major clown organizations with the museum. The affiliated clown organizations were given the role of selecting the first nominees. Balloting by the members of the ICHOF resulted in the election of Red Skelton, Lou Jacobs, Emmett Kelly, Mark Anthony, Felix Adler, and Otto Griebling. The first inductees were enshrined April 23, 1989.

Since then, 61 additional clowns have been inducted into the International Clown Hall of Fame. The ensemble has included living and historical American clowns and clowns from Europe, South America, and Africa. The ICHOF also annually bestows a "Lifetime of Laughter Achievement Award". This has gone to Willard Scott, who at one time played both Ronald McDonald and Bozo on TV before becoming known as The Today Show weather man, Max Patkin – the "Clown Prince of Baseball", Ben Barkin of the Great Circus Parade and Meadowlark Lemon – the "Clown Prince of Basketball."

In 2004, ABC News columnist Buck Wolf settled a long-running clown controversy by inducting Pinto Colvig as the original Bozo. A series of investigative pieces he wrote proved that show business promoter Larry Harmon had a pattern of taking credit for inventing TV's most famous clown.

== Inductees ==
- Red Skelton
- Otto Griebling
- Mark Anthony
- Lou Jacobs
- Felix Adler
- Emmett Kelly
- Leon McBryde
- Joseph Grimaldi
- Bob Keeshan
- Michael Polakovs
- Glen "Frosty" Little
- Frankie Saluto
- Dan Rice
- Bobby Kay
- Prince Paul Alpert
- Paul Jung
- Gene Lee
- Arthur Vercoe Pedlar
- Adrian "Grock" Wettach
- Steve Smith
- Roy Brown
- Oleg Popov
- Albert Fratellini
- Al Ross
- Nicolai Poliakoff
- Joe Jackson Sr.
- Jim Howle
- Bumpsy Anthony
- Annie Fratellini
- Joe Vanni & Chester Sherman
- Edwin "Poodles" Hanneford
- Jimmy Williams
- Don Burda
- Dimitri
- Jackie LeClaire
- Bob Bell
- Bill Bailey
- Bert Williams
- George Foottit & Chocolat
- Robert Armin
- Peggy Williams
- Ernie "Blinko" Burch
- Umberto "Antonet" Guillaume
- Richard "Snowflake" Snowberg
- Charlie Rivel
- Bob Hamilton
- Bill Irwin
- Nola Rae
- George L. Fox
- François Fratellini & Paul Fratellini
- Francesco Caroli
- Duane Thorpe
- Irvin Romig
- Charlie Chaplin
- Billy Jim Baker
- Bill Ballantine
- Harold "Happy" Kellems
- Charlie Cairoli
- Barry Lubin
- Avner the Eccentric
- W.D. Robbins
- Pinto Colvig
- Giovanni Zoppe
- Earl Chaney
- Bobo Barnett
- Billy Vaughn
- Paul Wenzel
- Dougie Ashton
- Chuck Burnes
- Carle "Swede" Johnson
- Harry Dann
- Kenny Dodd
- Paul Jerome
- Ruth Anne Chaddock
- Tom and Tammy Parish
- The Rastelli Family
- Bello Nock
- Pio Nock
- Frank "Slivers" Oakley
- Albert "Flo" White
- Freddie Trenkler
- George Carl
- Jerry Bangs
- Greg DeSanto

== See also ==
- Clowns of America International
- International Circus Hall of Fame
