= Glen Little (clown) =

- Born: Glen Gordon Little; December 5, 1925; Genoa, Nebraska
- Died: October 26, 2010 (aged 84); Kimberly, Idaho
- Other names: Frosty Little, Frosty the Clown
- Occupation: Circus clown

Glen Gordon "Frosty" Little (December 5, 1925 – October 26, 2010) was a circus clown who served with the Ringling Bros. and Barnum & Bailey Circus for over 20 years. He was one of only four clowns ever to have been given the title "Master Clown" by the Ringling organization.

== Early life ==
He was born in 1925 in Genoa, Nebraska to Elsie and Glen Little.

Little saw his first circus at the age of seven, which instilled a lifelong love of the circus in him. His nickname "Frosty" was given to him as a boy by his grandfather, who compared him to Jack Frost due to his love of playing in the snow. Little used the pseudonym extensively, even signing his checks "Frosty Little".

Little served in the US Navy during World War II, and was wounded. He learned juggling from a fellow patient while convalescing, a skill that would later help him land his first clowning jobs.

In 1971, he married his wife, Patricia, a photographer and former schoolteacher, with whom he had two daughters. He had an additional daughter by a prior marriage.

== Early career ==
Prior to joining the Ringling outfit, Little worked as a postal employee and land surveyor in Colorado. From 1954 to 1956, he performed as a clown at a local amusement park on weekends, wearing a rented costume. In 1956, he went into clowning full-time after he was hired by the Joe King Circus, with which he toured the Rocky Mountain States for half of the year. The rest of the year, he freelanced as a clown at birthday parties and special events. He continued working for the Joe King circus for seven years until its closure in 1962.

== With Ringling Brothers ==
Little also worked for other small outfits like the Tom Mix Show and Sells Floto Circus, but he had long had his eye on "The Greatest Show on Earth" – Ringling Bros. In 1968, he finally got his chance when Ringling Bros. created the Ringling Bros. and Barnum & Bailey Clown College; Little was in its first graduating class, and at the age of 44, he landed a job with Ringling's newly split-off second touring unit.

In 1970 Little was promoted to "Boss Clown" of his unit, and from 1980 until his retirement in 1991, he was the circus' "Executive Clown Director", overseeing clowns in both units, and writing new gags for the clowns to perform. In his lifetime, he wrote over 300 gag routines. In his later career, Little also served as an advance man for the circus.

From 1980 until its closure in 1997, Little also taught at his alma mater, the Ringling Brothers clown college. In 1988, Little also helped establish the Ringling circus' first overseas touring unit (based in Japan), choreographing gags and training members of their clown staff.

Among the dignitaries he entertained were US Supreme Court Justice Sandra Day O'Connor and US President Richard Nixon. He also appeared on 12 Ringling Bros. TV specials.

Little sustained several injuries over the course of his career, including seven broken ribs, ruined knees, and numerous other injuries that left him with "crooked fingers". After one accident, he was rushed to the hospital (after completing his performance) still wearing his clown suit.

== Honors ==
In 1983, Little was named "Master Clown" by the Ringling organization, only the fourth clown ever to be so named (after Otto Griebling, Bobby Kaye, and Lou Jacobs – Little's mentor). Little was the last person ever to have been awarded the title, and was the last surviving Master Clown at the time of his death.

Little was inducted into the Clown Hall of Fame in 1991.

== Post-career ==
After his retirement, Little lived in Burley, Idaho, where he ran a circus museum. In 1996, Little wrote a book on his experiences as a clown, titled Circus Stories: Boss Clown on the Ringling Brothers and Barnum & Bailey Circus for More than 20 Years.

In 1977 Little was asked by the Sarasota Herald-Tribune what he would do after he retired from the circus. Little replied, "Leave here? Are you out of your mind? I'm never going to leave here. I'll always be a clown."

On October 26, 2010, Little died in Kimberly, Idaho at age 84. He was survived by his wife Patricia.
