= Dick "Rocko" Lewis =

- Born: Richard Henry Lewis III; June 4, 1908; Butte, MT, US
- Died: October 22, 1966 (aged 58); San Antonio, TX, US
- Occupation: Circus clown

Richard Henry Lewis III (June 4, 1908 – October 22, 1966), better known by his stage name "Rocko," was a circus performer and entertainer who performed as a clown in more than twenty circuses between 1938 and his accidental death during a performance in 1966.

Lewis was born in Butte, Montana. In approximately 1938, Lewis was working odd jobs for the Al G. Barnes Circus when he met Felix Adler, who encouraged Lewis to become a clown. Lewis went on to work with renowned performers such as Adler, Emmett Kelly, and Otto Griebling. Lewis performed with the Ringling Bros. Circus, Clyde Beatty and Cole Bros. Circus, Russell Bros. Circus, Ward Bros. Circus, Gil Gray Circus, Polack Circus, Shrine Circus, and others, and served as the resident clown at the Circus World Museum in Baraboo, Wisconsin in 1965 and 1966.

Lewis's signature act was the "table rock," a dangerous balancing act where Lewis would rock back and forth atop three stacked card tables before tumbling off in a somersault. Lewis died after falling from the stacked tables and striking his head during a Shrine Circus performance in San Antonio, Texas in 1966.

Lewis made uncredited appearances as a clown in various films and television productions including "The Greatest Show on Earth" (1952), "Here Come the Girls" (1953), "Ring of Fear" (1954), and "The Clown Who Cried," a 1954 episode of "The Adventures of Superman" in which Lewis performed the table rock as a stunt double.
