= Bobo Barnett =

Bobo the Clown

Chester Eugene "Bobo" Barnett (October 23, 1903 – February 18, 1985) was a clown whose career lasted from the late 1920s to the early 1970s. He played for numerous circuses, most notably with Cole Bros. Clyde Beatty Circus (now known simply as Cole Bros. Circus) and the Shrine Circus. He also appeared on The Ed Sullivan Show. Barnett is one of the main subjects of his daughter Bonnie's autobiography, Bobo's Daughter.

== Biography ==
Chester Eugene Barnett was born in Tenaha, Texas, to John and Minnie Barnett. He had four siblings: Herman, William, Hazel and John Winifred. Longing to leave his small town, Barnett joined the circus and worked as a caretaker for the elephants. During this time he developed his clowning techniques, eventually joining clown alley as a white-faced clown. He also began a performing partnership with fellow clown Art Lind. The nickname "Bobo" came from his days as a precocious child. He would often run around his house with a paper bag on his head with two holes cut out for eyes, calling himself "Bobo", which also happened to be the name of a community near Tenaha.

On the Cole Bros. show he met and eventually married his third wife, Dorothy Sporney (known as Dottie Pressley at the time). Dorothy was a dancer on the show, performing with her sister Angeline (Dolly). When Dolly married Art Lind, Chester and Dorothy both lost their performing partners. At the wedding, they struck a deal to perform together – which eventually led to their marriage.

== Awards and honors ==
In October 2010, Bobo the Clown was inducted into the International Clown Hall of Fame.
