= Richard Lewis =

Richard, Rich, Richie, Rick, Ricky or Dick Lewis may refer to:

== Arts, entertainment and media ==
- Richard Field Lewis Jr. (1907–1957), American radio network owner
- Dick "Rocko" Lewis (Richard Henry Lewis III, 1908–1966), American entertainer
- Richard Lewis (tenor) (1914–1990), Welsh singer
- R. W. B. Lewis (Richard Warrington Baldwin Lewis, 1917–2002), American literary scholar and critic
- Richard Lewis (comedian) (1947–2024), American comedian and actor
- Richard B. Lewis (born 1953), American film producer
- Richard B. Lewis (production designer), American art director and production designer
- Richard Lewis, American musician and member of Beatles tribute band The Fab Four
- Rick Lewis (radio personality) (1960–2001), American radio announcer
- Richard Lewis (journalist) (born 1984), British esports journalist and commentator
- Rick Lewis (journalist) (fl. 1990s), British journalist
- Richard J. Lewis (fl. 21st century), Canadian film director

== Law and politics ==
- Richard Lewis (English MP) (1627–1706), English landowner and politician
- Richard Lewis (Canadian politician) (1824–1875), mayor of Victoria, British Columbia
- Dick Lewis (politician) (1900–1966), Welsh politician active in England
- Richard Lewis (Australian politician) (1939–2019), Australian politician
- Richard Lewis (Kentucky politician), American politician; member of the Kentucky House of Representatives
- Richard Lewis (Antiguan politician) (born 1967), member of parliament for St. John's Rural West
- Richard Lewis (New Zealand politician) (born 1969), New Zealand politician
- Rick Lewis (politician), American politician; member of the Oregon House of Representatives

== Religion ==
- Richard Lewis (bishop of Llandaff) (1821–1905), British religious leader
- Richard Lewis (priest) (1935–2022), English priest; Dean of Wells
- Richard Lewis (bishop of St Edmundsbury and Ipswich) (1943–2020), British religious leader

== Sports ==
- Richard Lewis (Middlesex cricketer) (1874–1917), English cricketer
- Richard Lewis (cricketer, born 1947), English cricketer
- Rich Lewis (born 1950), American football player
- Richard Lewis (sports administrator) (born 1954), British tennis player and sports administrator
- Richie Lewis (born 1966), American baseball player
- Ricky Lewis (born 1982), American soccer player

== Others ==
- Dic Penderyn (born Richard Lewis, 1808–1831), Welsh criminal defendant
- Richard Lewis, secretary of the Royal National Lifeboat Institution
- Richard D. Lewis (born 1930), British linguist
- Ric Lewis (born 1962), British-American businessman
- Richard Lewis (police officer) (fl. 21st century), British chief constable

== See also ==
- Richard Louis (born 1964), sprinter
