= Frankie Saluto =

American clown (1906–1982)

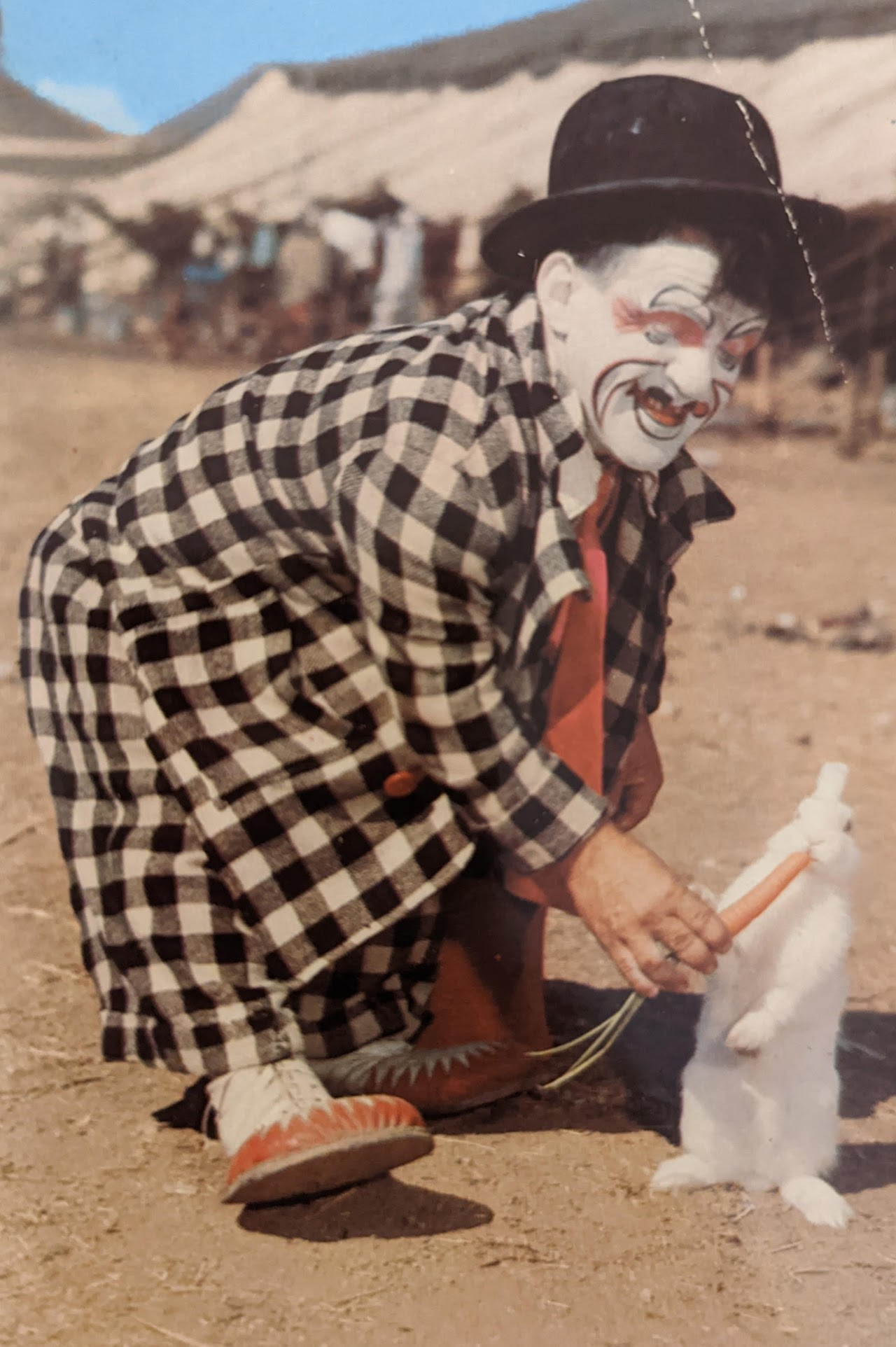
- Saluto with his trained bunny rabbit, Buns
- Born: November 8, 1906; Massachusetts
- Died: July 30, 1982 (aged 75); Sarasota, Florida
- Occupation: Professional clown
- Employer(s): Ringling Brothers and Barnum & Bailey Circus, Clyde Beatty and Cole Bros Circus
- Known for: "King of the Midget Clowns"
- Honours: Inducted into the International Clown Hall of Fame

Frankie Saluto (November 8, 1906 – July 30, 1982) was an American clown. Standing at just 3'10, he was known as "King of the Midget Clowns". His career spanned 46 years as a professional clown, starting in 1928, although he did not appear in guides until 1931. Saluto spent most of his career with Ringling Brothers and Barnum & Bailey circus. He retired in 1974 and was inducted into the Clown Hall of Fame in 1991.

== Biography ==
Saluto was born in Massachusetts on November 8, 1906. He began performing as a clown in 1928 and would go on to have a 46-year career with the Ringling Brothers and Barnum & Bailey Circus. Some of his notable routines included a Charlie Chaplin impersonation, performances with a giant rabbit, and playing the gas station attendant in Lou Jacobs' car gag. He was also a member of the Ringling Giants, a dwarf baseball team that raised money for charity, and was frequently a part of the group of performers who visited children's hospitals to help promote the circus and entertain ill children. Saluto was awarded a diamond stickpin bequeathed to the "most popular clown" in John Ringling's will.

Around 1955, during a tumultuous time for the circus industry, Saluto joined the Clyde Beatty and Cole Bros. Circus for five years, before returning to Ringling Brothers and Barnum & Bailey. He was also a member of the Shrine Circus, in 1951.

Saluto retired in 1974. He died in Sarasota, Florida on July 30, 1982, and was posthumously inducted into the International Clown Hall of Fame in 1991.
