= Felix Adler =

Felix Adler may refer to:

- Felix Adler (professor) (1851–1933), professor of political and social ethics, founder of the American Ethical Culture movement
- Felix Adler (screenwriter) (1884–1963), film writer, known for writing many Three Stooges scripts
- Felix Adler (clown) (1895–1960), long-time head clown of Ringling Brothers Circus
