= Dolly Jacobs =

American circus aerialist

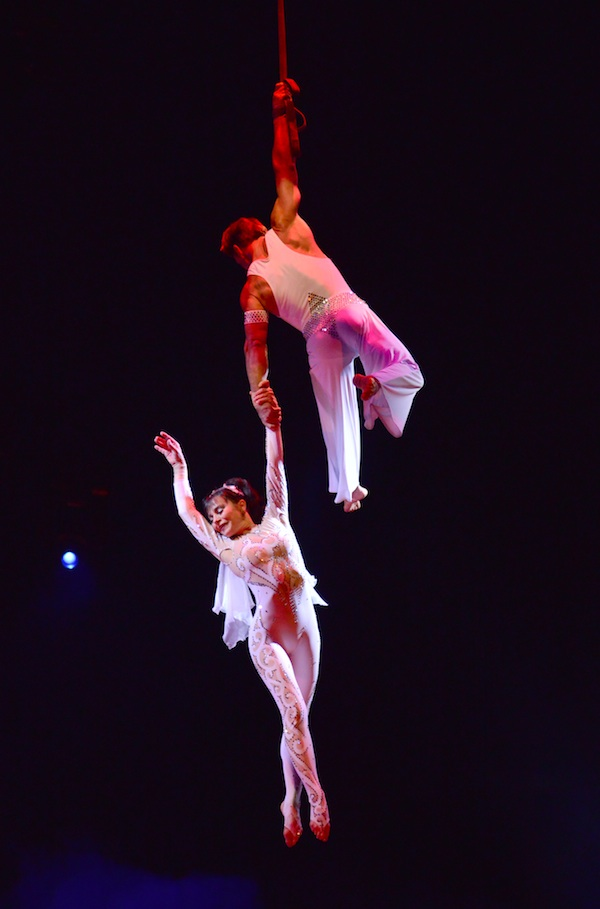
Jacobs (lower) in 2016

Dolly Jacobs (born c. 1957 in Sarasota, Florida) is an American circus aerialist. She is the daughter of famed circus clown Lou Jacobs and former New York fashion model turned circus performer Jean Rockwell Jacobs. She began her circus career in 1975. She was a featured performer with Ringling Brothers and Barnum and Bailey Circus. She left Ringling in 1984 for the Big Apple Circus where she worked until 1985 and again during 1987 and 1988.

She and her husband, fellow circus performer Pedro Reis, founded Circus Sarasota in 1997.

In 2012, Jacobs received the Florida Folk Heritage Award. She is a recipient of the 2015 National Heritage Fellowship awarded by the National Endowment for the Arts, which is the United States government's highest honor in the folk and traditional arts. She is the first circus performer to receive the prestigious NHF award. She has also won a Silver Clown award at the International Circus Festival of Monte Carlo.
