= Big Apple Circus =

Non-profit organization in the US

Origin
- Country: United States
- Founder(s): Paul Binder and Michael Christensen
- Year founded: 1977 Founding Chairman : Alan B. Slifka

Information
- Operator(s): Big Apple Circus
- Traveling show?: Yes
- Website: bigapplecircus.com

Big Apple Circus
- Formation: March 1977; 49 years ago
- Location: New York, NY
- Region served: United States
- Staff: 100+

The Big Apple Circus is a circus based in New York City. Opened in 1977, later becoming a nonprofit organization, it became a tourist attraction. The circus has been known for its community outreach programs, including Clown Care, as well as its humane treatment of animals.

Big Apple Circus filed for Chapter 11 bankruptcy protection in November 2016 and exited bankruptcy in February 2017 after its assets were bought by Compass Partners. The Circus was renewed in October 2017 for its 40th anniversary season and returned to start a new season in October 2018 at Lincoln Center, receiving generally positive reviews.

== History ==
=== 1970s ===
Gregory Fedin and his then-wife Nina Krasavina, both born and trained in Russia, started a circus school to train future "first" generation circus performers. They started the small school in a lower Manhattan loft.

The circus couple worked with Paul Binder and Michael Christensen to develop the Big Apple Circus following the European style "one ring" circus. In 1977, they located and secured an open ground area, in Battery Park, courtesy of founding chairman Alan B. Slifka, where the Big Apple Circus debuted. Headlining the early shows was a single trapeze, a dog act, tight rope walking, jugglers and clowns, double trapeze artists, and a host of other performers.

=== 1980s ===
The Big Apple Circus began the 1980s with a special holiday celebration in honor of the circus and its staff. In 1981, the circus began performing at Damrosch Park of Lincoln Center for the first time, continuing until 2015. In 1982, the circus won a silver medal at a circus performing competition held in Paris.

The circus began to arrange tours across New England in 1983. They also received an Obie award that year.

In 1985, the Boston Pops teamed up with Big Apple Circus for what was touted as an extraordinary collaboration and live performance. Also, in 1985 and for the next few years, BAC performers appeared as guest artists with the Metropolitan Opera at Lincoln Center.

In 1986, the organization opened the Clown Care unit.

The circus celebrated its tenth anniversary in 1987 with a big celebration, as well as a new tent and seating system added. Topping the celebrations was a prestigious silver crown, which the circus won at the International Circus School competition in Monte Carlo, Monaco, where six of the circus' acrobats and jugglers showcased their talent.

In 1989, NYNEX started to sponsor metropolitan New York tours to residents of the area and tourists as well. The tour included a trip to the Big Apple Circus' grounds. The circus and some of its performers were showcased in the Woody Allen movie Alice.

=== 1990s ===
In 1991, the circus appeared in a special from HBO, commemorating its 15th anniversary.

In 1996, Big Apple Circus traveled to both Chicago and Columbus, Ohio. Michael Christensen received two more awards, including one named after Red Skelton.

In 1991, Big Apple Circus' performers participated in a collaboration between American and Russian circus performers.

In 1993, the circus set a new attendance record. A new tent was purchased, and Michael Christensen was given a Parenting Achievement award by Parents magazine, to recognize his work with Clown Care. That same year, an incident occurred when one of the performing horses became entangled in another's reins, and an audience member severed the reins with a Swiss Army knife.

Gary Dunning became the Big Circus' executive director in 1994. Also, the coffee brand Chock full o'Nuts began sponsoring the circus.

Peter T. Grauer became the circus' Chairman in 1995, replacing Patricia Rosenwald.

In 1996, the circus' Art in Education program began to work in different grade schools. Clown Care continued to develop, opening chapters in Washington, D.C., and in Connecticut.

1997 saw new attendance records set, as an estimated 170,000 people went to see the circus' "Medicine Show" production over a total of 114 New York City performances. Furthermore, Clown Care completed 150,000 hospital visits in one year for the first time in the program's history.

During 1998, the circus celebrated twenty years of operation with engagements at New York's Lincoln Center for the Performing Arts and in Boston. TJ Maxx began to sponsor Big Apple Circus appearances in Chicago and in Atlanta by bringing the "Circus of the Senses" to those cities.

In 1999, Christensen was inducted into Miami's Ambassador David A. Walters pediatric Hall of Fame, for his "contributions to pediatrics" by way of the circus and its different programs.

"Circus of the Senses" attracted a large number of special needs children, with 9,000 participating. The circus dropped plans for a second unit that was to play in theaters after less than successful financial results during a trial run.

The 1990s also marked the beginning of a private school for the children who lived and traveled with the circus, titled "The One Ring School House," or "ORSH." The name is a play on "one room schools" and "one ring circus" (the Big Apple Circus branding itself via its traditional single performing ring in contrast to multiple-ring circuses such as Ringling Brothers and Barnum and Bailey). It was officially chartered by New York State, with teachers supplied by On-location Education, a charter program specializing in bringing standard primary and secondary education to children of performing artists, as well as child performers. Teachers were paid the New York substitute minimum, or negotiated contracts.

=== 2000s ===
In 2001, the circus' best-known performer, "Grandma" the clown (played by Barry Lubin), inducted into the International Clown Hall of Fame. A new seating system was installed in the circus big top, and, after the September 11, 2001 attacks, the circus opened its "Dreams of a City" show, which was dedicated to the City of New York.

New York City Mayor Michael Bloomberg proclaimed November 1, 2002, as "Big Apple Circus Day". The circus celebrated its 25th anniversary with a documentary film about the creation and production of that year's show.

In "Carnevale!", actors and circus performers Pedro Carrillo and Alesya Gulevich entered the Guinness Book of World Records when, in 2003, they set records, at the same moment, in their different specialties: Carrillo skipped a rope on the high wire 1,323 times in a row, and Gulevich twirled 99 hula hoops at the same time. Another show, "Circus to Go," allowed Big Apple Circus to reach new communities, specifically in Western states.

In 2005, Barry Lubin helped produce a show entitled "Grandma Goes To Hollywood."

On December 2, 2008, Britney Spears performed her hits Circus and Womanizer in a televised promotion concert on Good Morning America at the Big Apple Circus. The Big Apple Circus went on to become the opening act on The Circus Starring Britney Spears world tour.

In the 2008–2009 season, PBS filmed a documentary about the Big Apple Circus. The documentary, titled "Circus", portrays the lives of not only the performers but the crew as well. The six-part event aired starting November 2, 2010, in chronological order.

=== 2010s ===
The 2010–2011 season show was titled "Dance On", while the 2011–2012 season show was themed "Dream Big" and was the farewell tour for the clown character Grandma, played by Barry Lubin.

In 2014, the Big Apple Circus Metamorphosis was released to video.

==== Bankruptcy ====
In July 2016, it was announced that for the first time since 1981, the circus would not run for the 2016 holiday season. The Circus set a fundraising goal for $2 million in 2016 in an effort to maintain operations, but only half of the funds needed were raised. The circus filed for Chapter 11 bankruptcy protection on November 11, 2016. An auction of the assets of Big Apple Circus was announced on January 13, 2017. On February 14, 2017, Big Apple Circus announced that the U.S. Bankruptcy Court had approved the sale of their assets to Big Top Works, an affiliate of Compass Partners, for $1.3 million. As part of the sale, the circus was renewed for its 40th anniversary season.

==== 2017 relaunch – present ====
On March 21, 2017, Big Apple Circus announced on Today that acrobat Nik Wallenda of the Wallenda Family of circus performers would be the headline act in the 40th anniversary comeback season at Lincoln Center's Damrosch Park in New York City from October 26, 2017, to January 7, 2018. Additionally, the circus announced that following the New York performances, a national tour would take place.

In September 2018, Big Apple Circus announced Bindlestiff Family Cirkus owner Stephanie Monseu as the new ringmaster for the 41st season. The "high flying" season included a group of female-led acts that would be joining Monseu at the Big Apple Circus. These included Duo Fusion, Spicy Circus, and The Flying Tunizianis. It also introduced a VIP experience called the Mirror Room, which allowed ticket-holders to gain access to a wooden Spiegeltent with food, beverages, photo opportunities, and one-on-one interactions with performers.

In 2021, the circus was sold again, with Nik Wallenda as a minority owner.

== Other programs ==
Following the circus' emergence from bankruptcy in 2017, community programs "for low-income children and those with special needs as well as other programs geared toward helping the community" continued.

=== Circus of the Senses ===
Started in 1987, Circus of the Senses is a circus performance specifically geared towards children and adults with vision or hearing impairments, as well as special needs. Sign language interpreters and sound augmentation for deaf patrons allow the audience to experience the circus as never before. In 1999, over 6,000 children took advantage of these performances. The program is run by the Big Apple Circus.

=== Embracing Autism Performances ===
Started in 2017, upon the circus entering new ownership after bankruptcy, Embracing Autism performances have a reduced running time, as well as sensory adaptations.

=== Former Programs ===
Several community programs were originally started and run by the Big Apple Circus, and were not included in Big Apple Circus' bankruptcy sale, and have since been taken over by various local organizations.

==== Clown Care ====
Founded in 1986, the Big Apple Circus Clown Care program is composed of over 80 professional clowns, trained extensively in hospital procedures, circus skills, and improvisation, who make rounds as 'clown doctors' at various pediatric hospitals around the U.S. It is estimated that the clowns make more than 225,000 visits to children every year "in both inpatient and outpatient units, including intensive care, emergency room, physical therapy, bone marrow transplant, pediatric AIDS, and hematology/oncology."

==== Circus After School ====
Big Apple Circus' Circus After School program gives opportunities for "at-risk youth to develop life-enhancing skills such as teamwork, commitment, and responsible risk-taking through a structured program of learning and performing the circus arts."

==== Vaudeville Caravan ====
Founded in 2001 as a spin-off of the Clown Care program, the Vaudeville Caravan brings clowns to nursing homes.

==== Circus for All ====
The Circus for All program provides Big Apple Circus tickets to low-income and disadvantaged children, families, and the elderly.

==== Circopedia ====
Started in October 2008, Circopedia is an online circus encyclopedia.

== See also ==
- List of circuses and circus owners
- Katja Schumann, who performed the Big Apple Circus equestrian programme from 1981 to 2004.
- Jack Lepiarz, son of John Lepiarz (also known as "Mr. Fish"), the latter a circus clown who toured with the Big Apple Circus in the 1980s and 1990s.
