= Billy Jim Baker =

American songwriter

Billy Jim Baker is a professional clown and songwriter. A member of the International Clown Hall of Fame, he wrote two songs that were recorded by Jerry Jeff Walker, "Too Old to Change" (featured on the 1979 album of the same name) and "Contrary to Ordinary" (featured on the 1978 album of the same name).

In 1976, Baker invited Walker and Texas author Bud Shrake to be guest clowns at a Ringling Bros. Barnum & Bailey performance in Houston. Reportedly, Shrake said to Walker, "Jacky-Jack, some invitations are too good to pass up", and they accepted the invitation. The back cover of "Contrary to Ordinary" features a photo, taken by Shrake's wife, of Walker in full rodeo clown attire.

Baker sang the vocal on the English version of "The Ballad Of Fernando Valenzuela", a novelty song about the wildly popular, rookie pitcher for the L.A. Dodgers. The 45 rpm single was released on Screwball Records, during the Fernandomania craze in 1981.

Baker was part of the Hee Haw cast in 1992 and 1993.

Baker also worked at Dollywood in Pigeon Forge, Tennessee, as a clown from 1984 until 1996. He was a central part of the cast of the "Silver Dollar Jamboree," the theme park's signature daily finale show at that time. In addition to playing the role of Elwood Smooch, Baker sang several songs, including a stirring version of "In the Garden." Baker also performed as Elwood Smooch in Elwood Smooch's Hillbilly Hoedown and Old Smoky Hoedown, as well as at The Comedy Barn, in Pigeon Forge, Tennessee. Baker's "The Old MacDonald Rap" was a highlight of many of his shows.

Baker was inducted into the International Clown Hall of Fame in 2001.

In 2009, Baker performed in Elwood Smooch's Choo Choo Cha Boogie Variety Show at the Chattanooga Choo Choo in Chattanooga, Tennessee.

He currently resides in Gatlinburg, Tennessee.
