= Paul Binder =

American circus proprietor

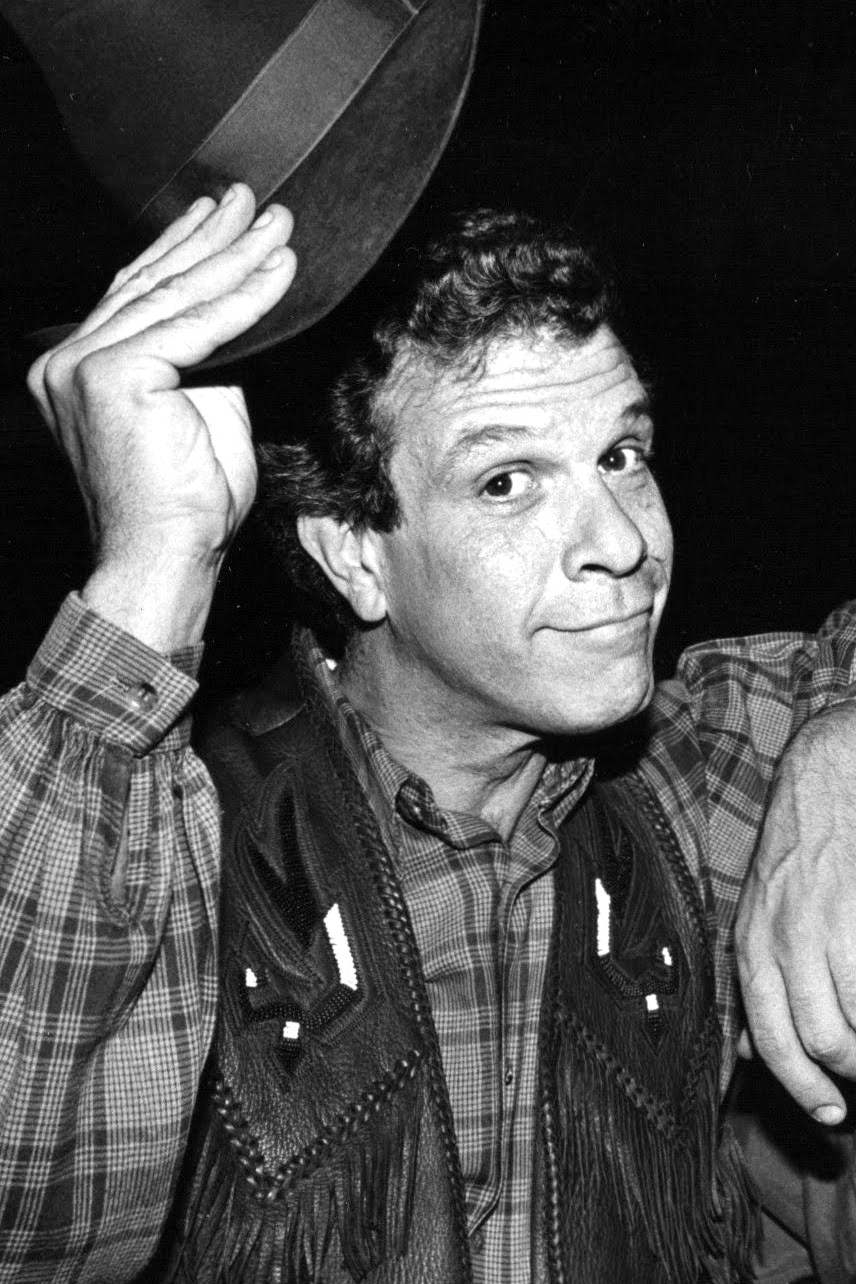
- Binder in 1989
- Born: Paul Lewis Binder; October 19, 1942 (age 83); Brooklyn, New York, U.S.
- Education: Dartmouth College, AB/DFA; Columbia University, MBA
- Known for: Founder of Big Apple Circus
- Spouses: Vivian Bachrach (m. 1965–1968) Katja Schumann (m. 1985–2004)

Paul Lewis Binder (born October 19, 1942) is the founder, founding artistic director, and former ringmaster of the Big Apple Circus.

== Early life and education ==
Binder was born on October 19, 1942, in Brooklyn, New York to a Jewish family. He graduated with a bachelor's degree in medieval history from Dartmouth College in 1963 and MBA from Columbia University in 1967. At Dartmouth, he had his first show business experience as an improv comedian with the Dartmouth Players. One of Dartmouth's educational philosophies was a belief in community service, which Binder later embraced with the Big Apple Circus' community programs. In 1971, Binder joined the San Francisco Mime Troupe, where he learned to juggle.

== Big Apple Circus ==
Binder was a street performer in Europe when he and Michael Christensen, whom he met while both were with the San Francisco Mime Troupe, decided to make circus performing their profession. At the time, they were in Kent, England, where they polished their act in a barn over 10 days. They made their living as street performers, traveling through cities from London to Istanbul over the course of 18 months.

In 1976, they finalized an accord with Annie Fratellini and Pierre Étaix to tour France with their new traveling show, the Nouveau Cirque de Paris. Binder would later eulogize Fratellini, saying, "She harkened back to the golden age of clowning in France. If there had been no Annie Fratellini, there would be no Big Apple Circus. She brought us to her circus and showed us the beauty of the intimate theatrical circus, and that was the inspiration for our circus." Along with Christensen, Binder also participated in the famed Casino de Paris, as well as on French television shows.

In 1977, inspired by his time with the Nouveau Cirque de Paris, Binder founded the Big Apple Circus in New York City, with Christensen later being named co-founder. Glen Collins, reporting for The New York Times, described Binder as, "big of voice, broad of shoulder and barrel of chest, the impresario is a fast-talking six-footer with a carny barker's lung power and a smoldering cigarette perpetually threatening to burn his index finger."

In October 2008, The New York Times reported that Binder would be retiring from his role as ringmaster and artistic director for the Big Apple Circus in 2009, although he continued to work behind the scenes as "founder and founding artistic director." During that time, ABC News named Binder "Person of the Week".

In April 2013, Binder published his memoir Never Quote the Weather to a Sea Lion and Other Uncommon Tales from the Founder of the Big Apple Circus. It has a foreword by Glenn Close.

In 2017, Binder and Christensen performed at the 50th annual Smithsonian Folklife Festival to "hand over the keys" to the circus' new leadership after it emerged from filing for bankruptcy the year before, which in the Big Apple Circus' case was a rubber chicken and a top hat.

== Other career ==
After college, Binder moved to Boston, where he was hired by WGBH-TV as a Floor Manager for Julia Child's The French Chef, and he later worked in New York City and Los Angeles as Talent Coordinator with The Merv Griffin Show and Associate Producer of the original Jeopardy!.

Between 1977 and 1984, Binder and Christensen appeared as jugglers on Sesame Street.

In 2016, Binder performed in his cabaret THE TALL AND SHORT OF IT with co-star Dana Mierlak.

In 2017, Binder performed in another cabaret P-P-P-Paul and K-K-K-Katie with co-star Katie Galuska.

== Recognition ==
Binder's dedication to circus life and the success of the Big Apple Circus have helped him garner a variety of awards and honors, many of which he shares with Christensen. Both men were elected to honorary memberships in the New York arts and literary organization The Lotos Club.

Binder has received an honorary Doctorate of Fine Arts from Dartmouth College, his alma mater. He was also honored by Long Island University (Doctor of Humane Letters), Pratt Institute, and Rhode Island College.

In 2001, Binder was declared a "New York City Living Landmark" by the New York Landmarks Conservancy society.

In 2014, Binder was inducted into the Circus Ring of Fame in Sarasota, FL, a city with the nickname "Circus City".

== Personal life ==
In 1964, Binder married his first wife, Vivian Bachrach.

In 1984, Binder married his second wife, Katja Schumann.

As of 2013, Binder is the father of four adult children (two of whom performed with the Big Apple Circus) and also has five grandchildren.
