= William Washington Cole =

American circus owner (1847–1915)

William Washington Cole (1847 – March 10, 1915), was part owner of the Barnum & Bailey Circus.

== Biography ==
He was born in 1847 in New York City to the contortionist William H. Cole and wire walker Mary Ann Cooke. In 1884, he established "W.W. Cole’s New Colossal Shows", which survives to this day, as the Cole Bros. Circus.

He died on March 10, 1915. He left an estate in excess of $5,000,000.
