= Clown care =

Health care by specially trained clowns

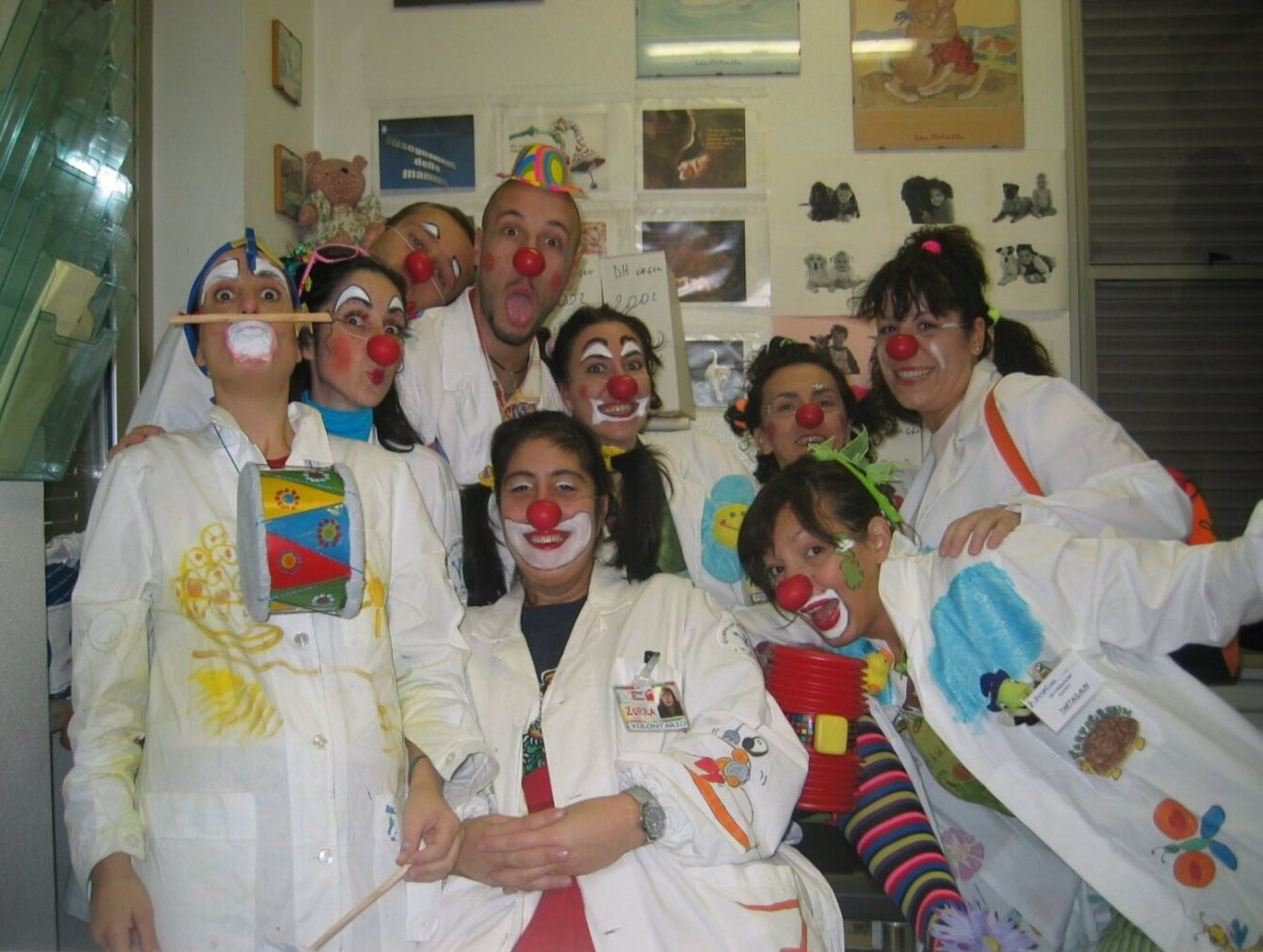
A clown care troupe at service at the hospital Bambino Gesù in Italy.

Clown Care, also known as hospital clowning, is a program in health care facilities involving visits from specially trained clowns. They are colloquially called "clown doctors" which is a trademarked name in several countries. These visits to hospitals have been shown to help in lifting patients' moods with the positive power of hope and humor. There is also an associated positive benefit to the staff and families of patients.

== Background ==
Patch Adams, considered the first hospital clown, started being a hospital clown in the 1970s. He was portrayed in the 1998 film Patch Adams by Robin Williams, bringing attention to hospital clowning.

Professional Clown Doctors began working in hospitals in 1986 under a program called the Big Apple Circus Clown Care Unit, which was started by Michael Christensen in New York City. Clown Doctor programs now operate in every state in Australia, New Zealand, the United States, the United Kingdom, Canada, Israel, South Africa, Hong Kong, Brazil, Belarus, Taiwan and all over Europe and in some parts of India.

== Purpose ==
Clown Doctors attend specifically to the psycho-social needs of the hospitalized child but in some hospitals they also visit adults. They parody the hospital routine to help children adapt to their surroundings, they also distract from and demystify painful or frightening procedures. The atmosphere of fun and laughter can help children forget about the illness and the stress for a moment.

Clown Doctors use techniques such as magic, music, storytelling and other clowning skills to empower children with doses of fun that help them deal with the range of emotions they may experience while in hospital: fear, anxiety, loneliness, boredom.

According to Tan, Metsälä, and Hannula, "Clown care creates a positive emotional state, promotes interaction between parents and child, and fosters affirmative environmental conditions."

Clowning has also been used with older people who have dementia.

== Research ==
Hospital clowning reduces stress and anxiety for children who are in hospitals, as well as for their parents.

Research on the physiological health benefits of laughter has been conducted for decades and continues to be carried out by medical physicians internationally. There is also a growing group of researchers that are exploring the psychological benefits of laughter, and specifically the work of Clown-Doctors.

== See also ==
- Theodora Children's Charity
