= Fratellini family =

European circus family

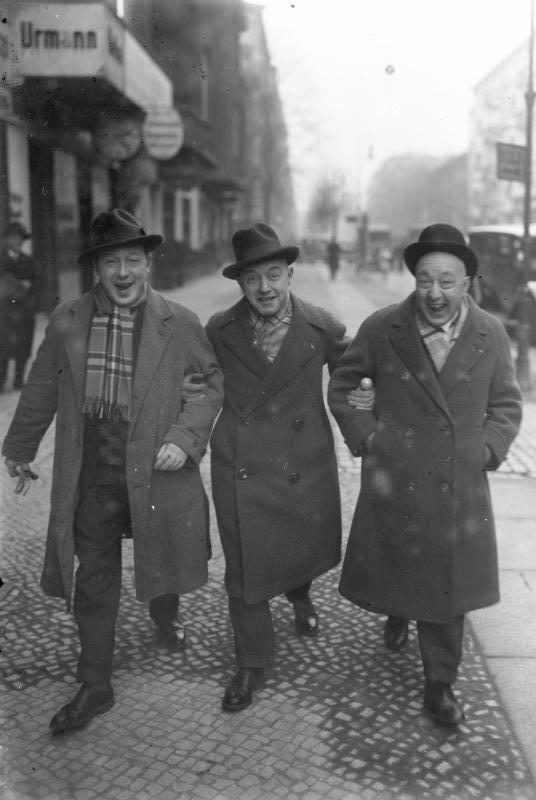
The Fratellini brothers in Berlin, 1927

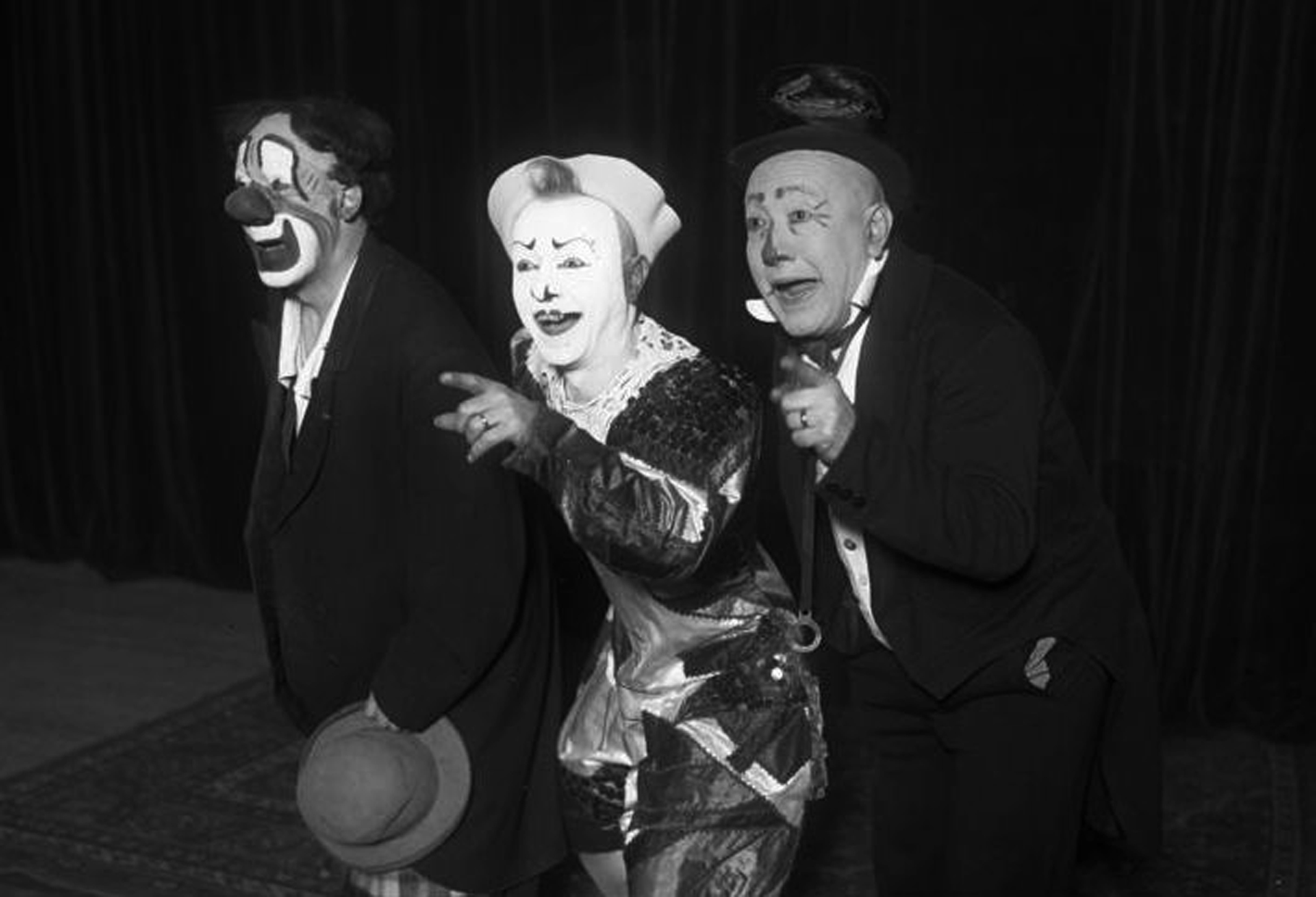
As clowns, 1932

The Fratellini family was a famous European circus family in the late 1910s and 1920s. An engagement at the Circus Medrano in Paris, France, after World War I was so successful that it sparked a strong resurgence of interest in the circus. By 1923, the Fratellini brothers had become the darlings of the Parisian intellectuals. They were lauded in print and fans would show up at the circus just in time for the Fratellini entree, which sometimes ran as long as forty-five minutes.

The Fratellini's success has been attributed to many factors, but above all they succeeded because of their talent and experience. The Fratellini brothers were:

- Paul Fratellini (1877–1940)
- François Fratellini (1879–1951) poetic clown
- Albert Fratellini (1886–1961), very wild, and crazy

Their father, Gustavo Fratellini (1842–1905), was an Italian patriot rebel, along with Giuseppe Garibaldi. Gustavo Fratellini took part in the unification of Italy. Some of the family later settled in France.

Other members of the family include:

- Annie Fratellini (1932–1997)
