= Katja Schumann =

Swedish circus performer

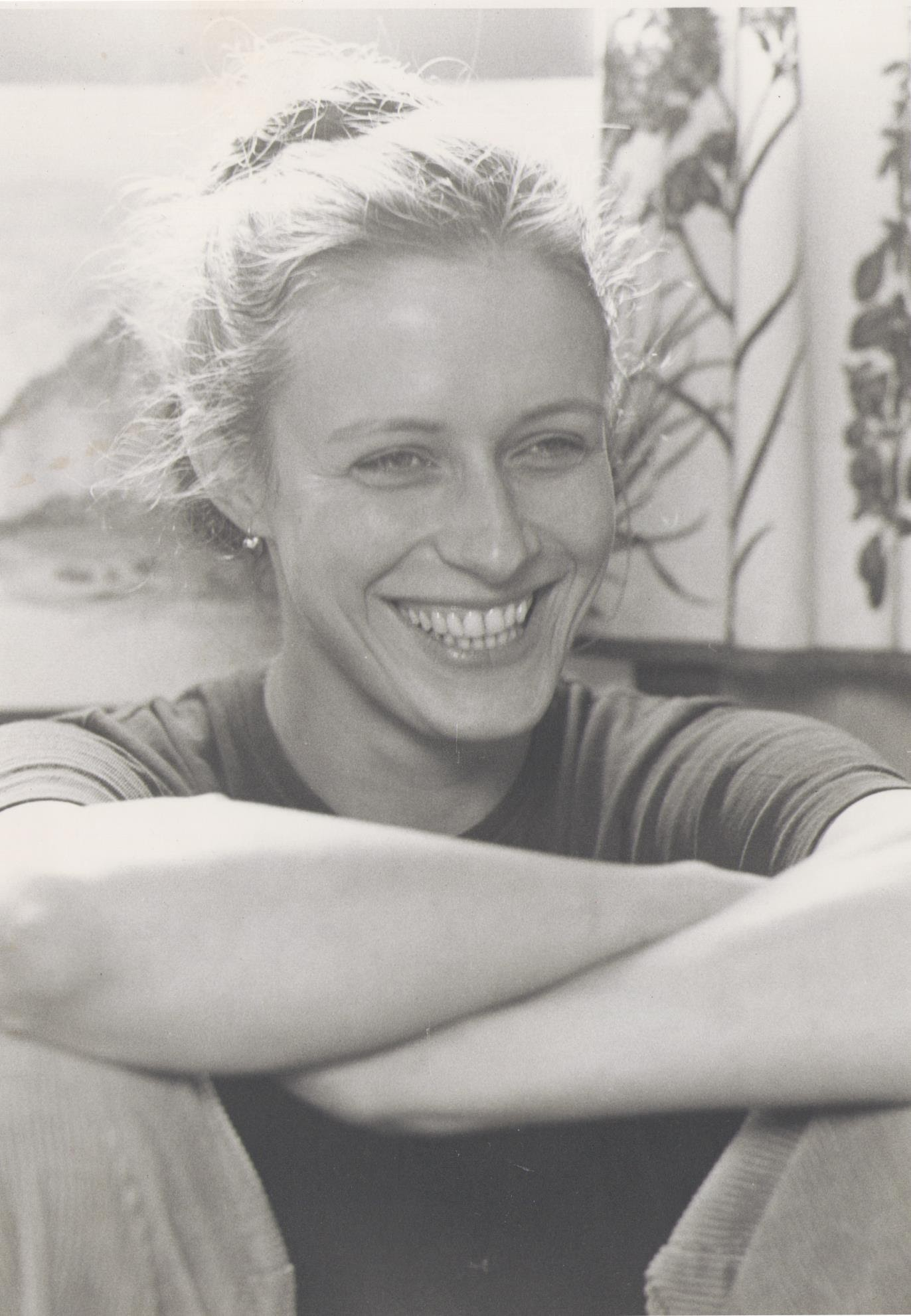
- Schumann in 1984
- Born: Katharina Schumann; September 16, 1949 (age 76); Frederiksberg, Denmark
- Citizenship: Denmark
- Occupations: Equestrian; circus performer
- Known for: Cirkus Schumann, Big Apple Circus
- Spouse: Paul Binder (1985 - 2004)
- Website: www.cirkusgården-løkken.dk

Katharina "Katja" Schumann (born September 16, 1949) is a Danish-Swedish retired circus performer who performed with, among others, Cirkus Schumann and the Big Apple Circus.

== Early life ==
Schumann was born in Frederiksberg, a part of the Danish capital Copenhagen, to Ernst "Max" Schumann, a circus proprietor, and Vivi Merete Mikkelsen, the daughter of a Danish veterinarian.

== Career ==
=== Circus ===
Schumann made appearances with her family's circus in Denmark, Cirkus Schumann, representing the fifth generation of her family to perform in the circus. She starred in her own act at 10, and made appearances in her family's show through 1983. The term "Schumannship" was coined for the Schumann family, meant to invoke "superb equestrian skills." The family was known to present horses with "roman riding, rosinback, and liberty," though "her family’s specialty act is the art of dressage."

In 1974, Schumann was awarded La Dame du Cirque at the International Circus Festival in Monte Carlo.

In 1976, Schumann was awarded the gold medal at the Circus World Championships in London.

In 1981, she made her first appearance in Paul Binder's Big Apple Circus, marrying Binder in 1985, the year she also became the first woman in the United States to perform 'The Courier of St. Petersburg', originated by Andrew Ducrow. She also performed haute école. In 1992, she performed at the Big Apple Circus with her father and daughter, and would in later years perform with her son and niece. Reporting for The New York Times in 1993, Glenn Collins said Schumann was "tall and forthright, with a bone-crushing handshake."

While working in the United States, Schumann has presented a wide variety of horses, with a particular interest in Arabian and American Saddlebred horses. According to R.J. Candranell of Arabian Visions magazine, "The [Arabian] horses go back in all lines to the 1906 Davenport importation of Arabian horses from the Anazeh and Shammar tribes." Schumann says of horses, ”They are our colleagues, not our pets. We and the horses depend on one another. I think the bedouins and cowboys did the same.” Schumann would also occasionally lend her horses to other shows and their performers, such as bareback rider Timi Loyal of the Loyal-Suarez equestrian troupe, and pasture the animals on local farms when they were not working.

=== Film ===
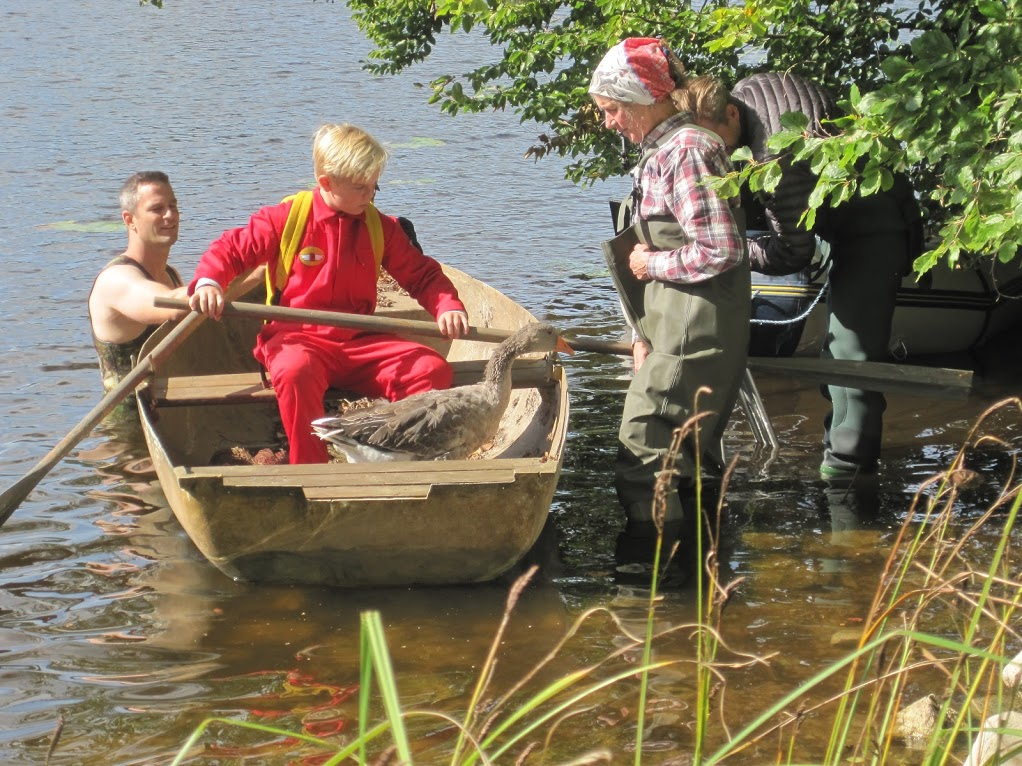
Schumann working behind the scenes on the Danish film Gooseboy, 2019

In 1965, Schumann appeared in a documentary short about her family, directed by her cousin, Benny Schumann.

In 1990, scenes for Woody Allen's film Alice were shot at the Big Apple Circus; Schumann makes an appearance presenting horses.

In 1991, she appeared in the HBO documentary The Big Apple Circus, commemorating the 15th anniversary of the show, narrated by her husband at the time, Paul Binder.

In 2019, she worked behind the scenes of Gooseboy, a family film about a young Danish boy and his goose guide; Schumann provided her trained goose and was credited as "animal handler."

In 2023, she was featured in Anne Svejgård Lund's Somewhere by the Sea, a documentary about the people of northern Denmark.

== Retirement ==
In 2015, Schumann purchased a dilapidated former pig farm in Løkken-Vrå, Denmark, a tourist town in the northern part of Jutland. She and her partner, Jens Oluf "Luffe" Bøgh, renovated the property into a working animal farm, seasonal circus, and museum showcasing Schumann's family history and artifacts.

== Personal life ==
Schumann has two children with Paul Binder, Katherine (b. 1985) and Max (b. 1987). Max was born in her family's RV, without a doctor or midwife present, after Schumann performed two shows earlier that day, experiencing "a couple of contractions during the act." She had gone into labor about two hours before showtime, but told nobody. Said Schumann of the birth, "I caught him before he hit the floor. He quacked and snorted a little and I thought, 'this boy looks just fine to me!' so I tucked him in with me under my bathrobe and waited for the midwives to arrive." Max was born on a Wednesday, and Schumann took off the Thursday morning circus show before returning to perform that evening.
