= Arthur Vercoe Pedlar =

British clown (1932–2022)

Arthur Vercoe Pedlar (21 September 1932 – 15 August 2022) was a British clown.

Arthur Pedlar was born into a Congregational family in Southport, on 21 September 1932. He was educated at Leighton Park School in Reading, Berkshire, England, a Quaker school. He first became interested in clowns when he visited Bertram Mills Circus in 1938. At school he discovered that he could communicate silently with an audience as a tramp clown and thus developed "Vercoe" the clown.

Pedlar learnt to unicycle at school and also to play various musical instruments. After undertaking national service, and before joining the family business, he worked in a troupe of clowns as part of the Cirque Medrano in Paris. He also worked for three weeks with Buster Keaton. During his career, Pedlar performed his clown act in Australia, Israel, Japan, Russia, and throughout Europe and Scandinavia.

Pedlar was an ordained Elder of the United Reformed Church, a combination of the Congregational and the Presbyterian churches. He was also a member of the "Holy Fools", an inter-denominational group of clowns who work in hospitals, prisons, schools, etc.

Pedlar was President of the World Clown Association. In 1998, he was awarded a place in the International Clown Hall of Fame.

Pedlar lived in Southport, was married, and had two children. He died on 15 August 2022, at the age of 89.
