= Eva Clark =

Aerialist and circus performer (died 1906)

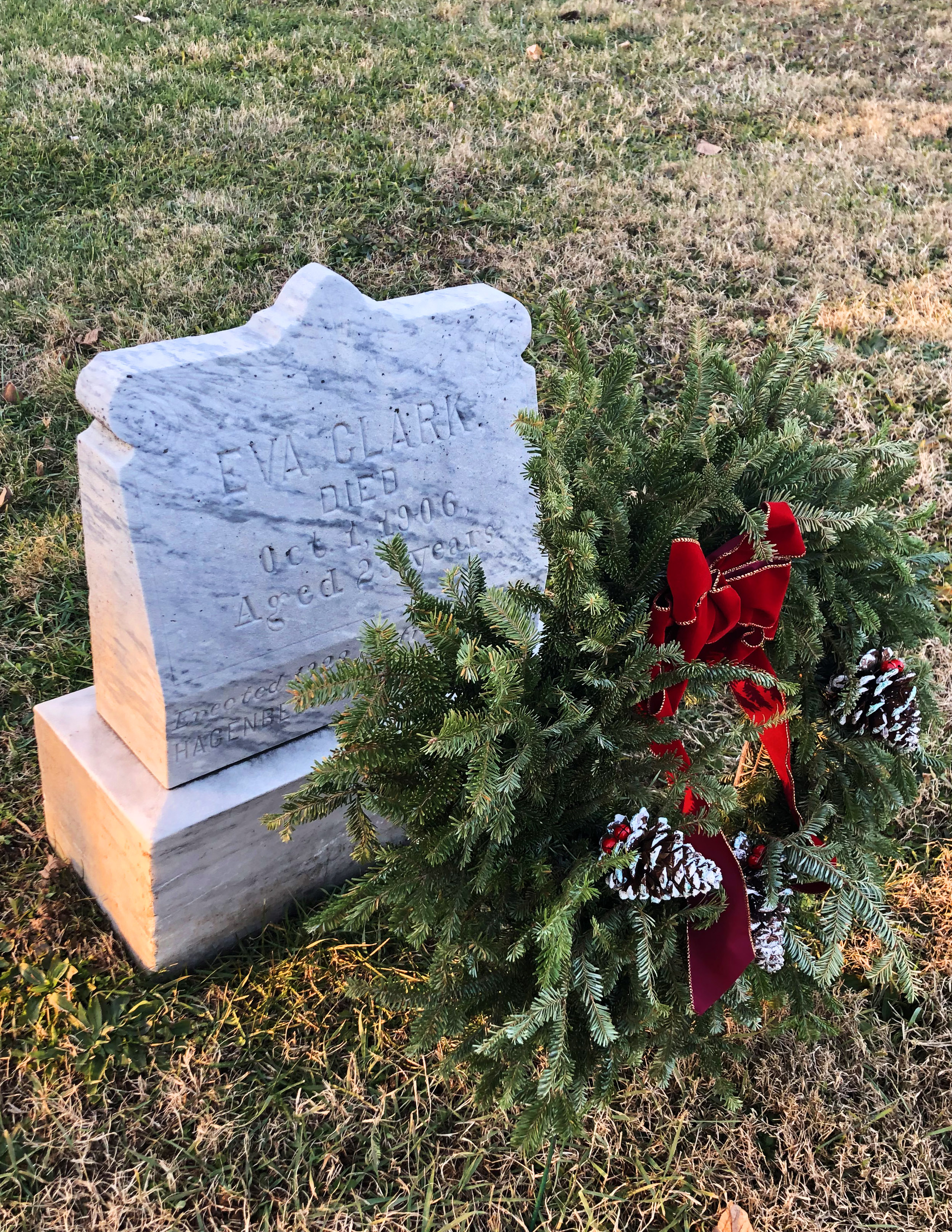
Eva Clark's headstone at sunset in Thornrose Cemetery with the annual Christmas wreath. (2018)

Eva Clark (also known as Eva Howard, Eva Adair, and Eva Kelley; died October 1, 1906) was a headlining aerialist and circus performer. She was shot in the abdomen by her estranged husband, Lum "Roser" Clark, after a show with Cole Bros. World-Famed Triple Railroad United Shows on September 6, 1906, in Staunton, Virginia, and died on October 1, 1906, from surgical complications. In the years prior to her death, newspapers referred to Eva as the "Queen of the Air".

== Early life and performance ==
Clark was born to entertainers Lee Howard Kelley and Alice Howard (later Adair). The exact year of her birth is unknown – articles at the time of her death listed her age as both 22 and 25, so it is likely that she was born between 1881 and 1884. In 1888, her parents were listed on rosters for the Clements & Russell Railroad Show. In 1890, her father, Lee Kelley, was listed in Chas. Lee's London Shows. Clark appeared as "Eva May" with her parents on McFadden's Amusement Enterprise and Pavilion Shows' roster in 1889. Later that year, "Baby Eva" was listed with her parents for the season opening of McClelland's Shows and Wild West. In 1891, the Howard Family was listed in Sautelie's Show, Clemens' European Shows, and Chas. Lee's London Circus. In 1892, Eva and her family were listed with the Wallace Shows. Clark was raised in Texas.

In 1893, Clark and her mother, Alice, joined Price's Floating Opera Co., an Ohio-based showboat. They were listed in "Notes from Price's Floating Opera" for all of 1893, including an excerpt in May that suggested Eva was ""very sick with fever, and her mother, Mrs. Alice Howard, was compelled to take her off the boat for a few weeks." They were also listed as part of Price's Floating Opera Co. in 1894.

== Marriage to Lum Clark ==
In 1897, Clark was listed in the Tuscaloosa Gazette as a performer in the W. C. Clark Shows, where Joseph Columbia "Lum Roser" Clark was also listed, stating that she "is an exceedingly pretty young lady, a very clever singer and a capital dancer and she created a most favorable impression. She was twice encored and graciously responded with other dances." Lum was the third eldest son of W. C. Clark, a founding member and manager of the Clark Bros. wagon show, known as "the largest show of its kind".

A marriage certificate from Troup County, Georgia, documents that Lum R. Clark and Miss Eva Kelley were married on December 11, 1897. Lum would have been 20 years of age, Eva between 13 and 16, depending on her birth year. In the following year, "Eva Clark" was listed for the first time in the W. C. Clark's United Shows as performing "flying rings and trapezist".

== Aerial career and continued fame ==
Clark's career as an aerialist brought continued fame in 1899, when The Hocking Sentinel complimented her performance with McCormick Silver Plate Circus as "the best flying exhibition ever seen in this country". In 1900, she is listed in John Robinson's 10 Big Shows as "Eva Adair" and then as "Eva Howard" later that year in Dr. Fretwell's Floating Palace. She continued using "Howard" in 1901 with Robinson's Show. In 1902, Sells & Downs listed Eva and Lum as joining the upcoming season, and in a January 1903 Newberry Herald and News article, Clark's performance is praised, stating "she seems to feel as much at home in the trapeze acts as if she were on the ground".

=== Divorce petitions ===
On May 30, 1903, divorce petition notices appeared in the Cincinnati Enquirer and the Cincinnati Commercial Tribune. The Enquirer stated "126.299. Eva Clark vs. Lum Clark. For divorce. C. J. Ryan" and "Eva Clark says in a petition for divorce filed yesterday that Lum Clark has refused to live with her since their marriage in Georgia in 1897 and has refused to provide for her in any way. Besides, he has beaten her and threatened to kill her, and did shoot at her. Charles Ryan, attorney." The Commercial Tribune ran a similar notice, stating "Eva Clark applied for a divorce from Lum Clark, to whom she was married in 1897. She charges him with failure to provide, beating her and making threats against her life. Attorney C. J. Ryan represents Mrs. Clark."

=== Accident at The Commodore and Queen of the Air ===
A July 1903 New York Clipper article reported that "Eva Howard, late of Robinson's Circus, while doing her act on the flying rings at the Comodore [sic.] Music Hall swung into an electric fan and was badly cut by the blades. She was knocked off the rings and unconscious when picked up." The extent of Eva's injuries were not reported, but less than a month after the accident she performed as "Miss Eva Howard" and received reviews in Dayton Daily News, which said she was "a charming soubrette who will be a popular idol, and who will make good in a number of pleasing songs, including 'Can't Live on Love' and 'Blew, Blew, Blew.' She will also appear in the flying rings and is known as the 'queen of the air.'" This is the first recorded instance of Clark being called the "Queen of the Air," an epithet that would follow her for the rest of her career.

In another review for her Fairview Park act, it was noted that "Miss Eva Howard, the petite aerialist known as 'Queen of the Air,' in her great specialty, 'In the Flying Rings,' was a former leading performer with the John Robinson and Sells Bros circus. If you want to see a daring hazardous act, her work will fill all the requirements. She is an exceedingly pretty woman, and has a magnificent wardrobe and other effects." The reviews followed Clark's performance for over a month, and a September Dayton Daily News article stated that she was "the charming performer who will be pleasantly remembered by thousands of our best people, will be seen and heard in a number of entirely new coon songs. She will also do her marvelous and daring mid-air and on the flying rings, the best and strongest act of its class in America."

=== 1904–1906 ===
In January 1904, Clark was listed in Billboard as a member of the Isle of Spice company roster in a Midwest tour. In April, Billboard announced that "Eva Howard, who made a decided hit at the Columbia Cincinnati, O., a few weeks [ago], has received a flattering offer to create the soubrette role in a prominent New York production. She will leave for the East shortly, and if the part is suitable, she will not be seen in vaudeville for some time to come." The next month, in May 1904, Clark and her mother, Alice, were listed with the American Water Circus, with "Eva Howard" on flying rings and trapeze and "Mrs. Howard" on flying rings and flying ladder.

In June 1904, the Cincinnati Enquirer reported that "Eva Hard [sic.], trapeze performer with W. H. Newman's American Water Circus, this afternoon publicly horsewhipped George Backentol, the circus concessionaire. She was assisted by two members of the band, who held Backentol while she applied the lash. She alleges Backentol talked about her in an uncomplimentary manner. Backentol denies the allegation."

A January 1905 Billboard excerpt stated that "Miss Eva Howard, for the past four seasons with the John Robinson Shows, is suffering with tonsillitis at her home 814 Main street, Cincinnati." This remains the only known street address for Clark. In April, Clark was mentioned for "double trapeze" in the roster of Geo. S. Ely's United Shows and Trained Animal Exhibition. In May, Clark was listed as performing with Sells & Downs on the flying rings and trapeze alongside her mother, Alice Adair, on flying ladder and doing barrel jumping. The Gazette Quebec, The Pittston Gazette, the Newark Advocate, and Daily Crescent all reported on Clark's "thrilling double trapeze work."

1906 began with continued headlines and accolades for Clark, who was listed as "Eva Clark" on a Cole Brothers World Famed United Shows herald and in articles about her "great act" on the swinging ladder. Surviving ephemera from Cole Brothers Tent City Chatter listed Eva "on the flying rings, swinging trapeze and in peculiar ladder exercises of great originality" and the show's herald listed her as "The Aerial Queen".

== Death and press coverage ==
Around 10 pm on the evening of September 6, 1906, Clark was shot after the Cole Brothers show in Staunton, Virginia. The first coverage on September 7 by the Staunton Daily Leader stated that Clark was "shot at the hands of James Richards." The Staunton Daily Leader reported:

"After the show, Mrs. Clarke [sic.], while in one of the dressing apartments was accosted by Richards, who had been drinking, and was abused by him. Richards insulted her and was treating her roughly when her husband appeared upon the scene. Clarke [sic.] at once interfered and a scuffle ensued when Mrs. Clark stepped between the two men one of whom was flourishing a pistol. In the mele [sic.] the weapon was discharged and the woman received a severe wound in the abdomen...the intestines were perforated sixteen times, one hole being found in the bladder."

After more details about the shooting were released, it was discovered that Lum Clark was the shooter, but "the gun went off without his intending it, the ball striking his wife who was standing to one side," while he was trying "to ward off a blow from Richards".

Clark suffered a "severe wound in the abdomen" and doctors were unable to locate the bullet during surgery. It was reported that her intestines were "perforated sixteen times". Clark lived for nearly a month after the shooting, before dying on October 1, 1906, after a second surgery was performed when her wound became infected. She had a funeral in Staunton, and was buried in an unmarked grave in Thornrose Cemetery. In 1923 a headstone was erected in her honor, commissioned by Hagenbeck-Wallace Circus.

According to news coverage after the shooting, Lum Clark and James Richards were never seen again; it was rumored that they both fled to Mexico to avoid prosecution. Eva Clark insisted until her death that the shooting was an accident.

=== James Richards ===
Based on newspaper records and interviews, it is likely that Clark met James Richards when she worked for Price's Floating Opera Co. in 1893. In the same New York Clipper blurb that reported Clark and her mother joined the company, it was stated that "Joe and Hattie Richards are not with W. C. Clark, as reported, but have signed with Price's Floating Opera Co. for the season." This blurb also connects Richards to Lum Clark via the W. C. Clark shows. This link corroborated by the Staunton Dispatch when the newspaper published new biographical information about James Richardson after an interview with Lum's brother, A. T. "Allie" Clark, who traveled to Staunton after the shooting. The Dispatch reported that, "Richards and Mrs. Clark were orphans who were brought up by the elder Clark just as his own children. They have all been together most of the time all their lives. Richards is a trapeze performer, as is also Mrs. Clark, while the latter's husband is a ticket seller with the show." This adoptive familial link was supported in a 2019 interview with Lum Clark's great-grandnephew, who stated:

"Eva and her 'brother' ... were apparently unrelated runaway children 'adopted' by Lum's father Wiley during the older show's tour of the Midwest. It was common for local children to join traveling circuses, and for the owners of the circus to take them into their 'family' perhaps to avoid legal complications as they moved from town to town with unrelated minors in their shows."

It is likely that Richards re-joined the Clark Shows after performing with Price's Floating Opera Co. and Clark followed him, subsequently getting "adopted" by the elder Clark for convenience in order to carry the young performers over state lines, as noted in the interview. Research shows that Clark continued performing with her mother in the years before her death and was not an orphan. Additional information on James Richards has not been uncovered.

=== Press coverage and inaccuracies ===
Over two dozen newspaper articles covered the shooting at various stages, including the Staunton Daily Leader, the Staunton Spectator and Vindicator, the Alexandria Gazette, the Atlanta Constitution, the Baltimore Sun, the Cincinnati Post, and the Cincinnati Enquirer. Much of the coverage lacked depth and consistency. Clark's name appeared with more than ten variants in coverage across the southeast, with the majority apparent in the Staunton papers. In print, Eva was addressed most often in the following ways: Mrs. J. T. Clarke; Mrs. L. B. Clark; Mrs. L. R. Clark; Mrs. Clarke; Lily Clark; Eva Clark; Mrs. Eva Howard Clark; Annie Clark; and Eva Howard. While some of the variants were acceptable, many were misspelled or inaccurate.

Lum Clark's name was reported with multiple variants, some accurate and some inaccurate, including L. B. Clark; In addition to his known name, James Richards was named within coverage as "Jim Richardson" and "Joe Richards" interchangeably.

== Local lore and contemporary interest ==
Clark story has continued to receive newspaper coverage through 2014, but the reporting did little to fill in biographical gaps or to correct inconsistencies; instead, it perpetuated the uncertainties of previous reporting and the story evolved into modern lore. The first coverage after Eva's gravestone was erected in 1923 was a 1931 Staunton News Leader article that stated Clark's story is "one of Staunton's unsolved mysteries, so far as official records go". A 1959 article in The White Tops discussed Clark's death and re-introduced the folklore aspect of the story, regarding Richards and Lum Clark stating, "apparently neither man ever was found." The White Tops article also introduces a "report that annually at Christmas time someone places a modest wreath on the grave of Eva Clark.

A 1977 News Leader article, "Grave still marked at Christmas," stated that Eva's grave is marked annually during the Christmas holiday season with a wreath, leading to much speculation and lore. According to this article, the "wreath tradition began at the time the stone was placed and has continued. No one seems to know who is responsible." Six years later, a letter to the editor titled "CIRCUS LORE" was published in the News Leader, listing her profession as an "equestrienne" and stating that "every Christmas Day since her death her grave in Thornrose is decorated with a wreath from an unknown source."

A 1999 article in The News Leader, titled "Circus girl lingered in death" remains one of the most comprehensive summaries of the Eva story published in recent years. Consistent with the older coverage, it states that Lum Clark remained a fugitive and was never seen after the shooting, even though he was exonerated. It also contains details that were not listed in the original coverage, including that "others asserted that Richards was drunk and lashed out at [Lum] Clark for the way he'd been treating his wife." It also stated that "Eva and James Richards had been adopted at a young age by none other than Eva's husband's father. The three had grown up together as siblings," which is the first time that this part of the backstory had ever been mentioned since the shooting. The wreath was also mentioned, but the 1999 article says the truth was "uncovered" recently and the wreath is "sent courtesy of 'The Society of Saints and Sinners,' a charitable organization connected with the entertainment industry."

A 2008 newsletter published by the Augusta County Historical Society, Augusta Annals, tells Eva Clark's specious story from the deceased performer's perspective, speaking for her using information from the Staunton coverage of the shooting. In 2008, Don Reid of the Statler Brothers, released a historical novel O Little Town: A Novel, loosely based on the death of Eva Clark.

A 2014 article in The News Leader, reaffirmed much of lore, stating that "her husband disappeared from the circus and was never seen again." The article, which details a 2014 visit to Clark's grave by members of the then-current troupe of Cole Bros. Circus, re-states coverage from the older news articles, focusing again on her tragic death.

=== 2020–21 New research and press coverage ===
In 2020, the first detailed biographical sketch for Clark, titled "Lore No More: Uncovering Eva Clark's Rightful Legacy," was published in Bandwagon: The Journal of the Circus Historical Society, providing information not previously published about the performer's life and career. Written by researcher Aíne Norris, the article details the Clark's early life and career, her relationship with Lum Clark, and death in Staunton. The Bandwagon article also re-introduced the only confirmed photograph of Eva Clark, which was printed as a vignette in the Cincinnati Post on October 4, 1906, after the performer's death. The photo, housed in the bound collection at the Cincinnati Public Library, was originally uncovered by researcher Dawn Tucker. The article introduces additional photos that are likely Eva Clark, including a 1901 photograph from the John Robinson Circus troupe and two photos from the National Police Gazette dated 1903 and 1904 that are listed under the same name, but unconfirmed. Also in 2020, authors and historians Lucinda Cooke and Stacey Baker of the Augusta County Historical Society published "Eva Howard Clark: Life and Death in the Circus (A Tragic Tale of the Daring Young Woman on the Flying Trapeze)" in the Augusta Historical Bulletin, discussing Clark's legacy and history in Staunton, Virginia with additional new research into Cole Bros. Circus.

==== New research about Lum Clark ====
The article also provided previously untold information about Lum Clark, both before his marriage to Eva and after her death. In 1896, Lum Clark was accused of robbing a residence using the aliases "Columbus Harding" and "Cotton Harding," but charges were dismissed due to insufficient evidence. In 1897, prior to his marriage to Eva, Lum Clark was linked to the August 13 murder of William Miller in Cumberland Gap, Tennessee. According to The Indianapolis News, he was arrested in June 1899:

"Joseph Clark, alias Lum Clark, alias Joe Rosser, arrested yesterday afternoon by detectives Garber and Morgan of Indianapolis, is wanted at Cumberland Gap, Tenn., for the murder of William Miller, a distiller of that place, two years ago. Clark's father is the owner of a traveling circus, which was exhibiting at Cumberland Gap at the time Miller was killed. The authorities in Tennessee have been notified, and Clark will be held until they can be heard from. Clark is also accused of killing a colored man at Cairo, Ill., about six months ago. Clark claims that he was here in search of a man who had eloped with his wife. He was heavily armed at the time of arrest."

Additional information about the court case or trial is not listed in the public domain, nor is any information about the accused killing in Cairo. Though Lum Clark's story has remained largely untold, as late as 2014 coverage continued to state that he disappeared from the circus after Eva's shooting and was never seen again. However, recent research proves that he did not leave the circus life or remain in Mexico for long. He returned to the United States after approximately a year in exile and rejoined his siblings in Louisiana in his uncle, M. L. Clark's show. He married a Louisiana French woman, Eugenia Ricaud, in 1908. In 1908 he was linked with the L. R. Clark Combined Shows, and in 1909 he took charge of Greater Electric theater outfit, purchased by his brother, Allie Clark. In 1932, a gorilla from Lum Clark's animal farm freed a python from its cage and brought it back to the gorilla pen and the story was covered in multiple news outlets. A 1965 issue of Bandwagon: The Journal of the Circus Historical Society revealed an incident in the early 1920s associated with Lum Clark:

"In the early 1920's Lum Clark was working on the show as a "patch" (fixer) and ran into some trouble, in a little town near Lexington, KY. A towner was helping raise the center poles when a guy line snapped causing the pole to fall while the man still had it on his shoulder. He was pushed to the ground and the pole broke his neck, killing him. The young man's father happened to be on the lot at the time. M. L. told Lum to get the father and keep him away from a lawyer, who would surely bring a plaster service. Accordingly Lum found the father and took him off in a rig to Lexington and bought him a suit of clothes and then proceeded to make the rounds of local saloons. However Lum got drunk and lost the man, who contacted a mouthpiece at once."

He eventually retired from the circus and settled in Tuscaloosa, Alabama. He died in 1936 and is buried in Tuscaloosa Memorial Park.

==== Press coverage ====
In 2020, the News Virginian published an article, "Past the lore: Norris, Tucker discuss their research about the life and career of Eva Clark," which marked the first contemporary coverage that focused on the performer's life, instead of her death. The story was picked up by the Cincinnati Enquirer in 2020 and in a 2021 special feature on WHSV-TV-3. Eva's story was featured on the Which Murderer? podcast episode Clowns & Circus Murders in 2021. In 2025, Eva was included in the episode Circus Tragedies and Mysteries of the South on the Southern Mysteries Podcast.
