= Barry Lubin =

American circus performer (born 1952)

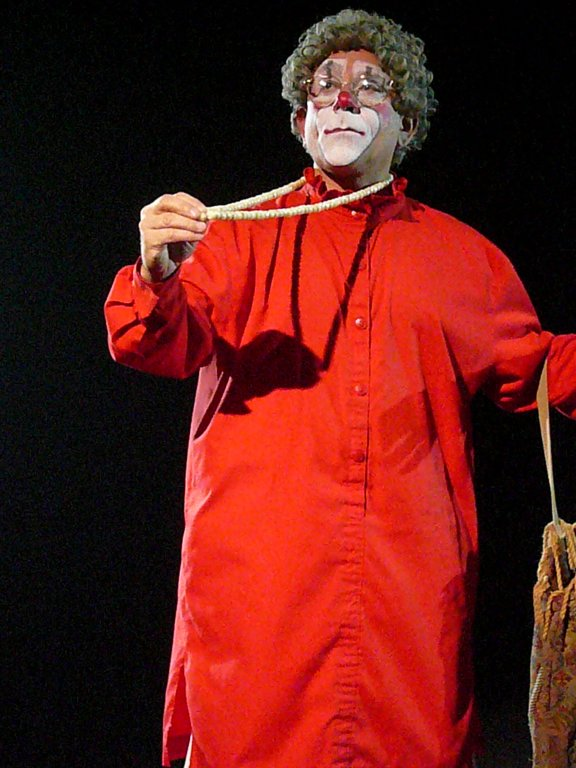
- Lubin as Grandma
- Born: July 3, 1952 (age 74); Atlantic City, New Jersey
- Years active: 1975-2012
- Known for: Grandma (clown)
- Spouse: Roberta Lubin
- Children: 2

Barry Lubin (born July 3, 1952) is an American former circus performer best known for his Grandma the Clown character, a headline act at the Big Apple Circus in New York City for 25 seasons from 1982 until his 2012 retirement and relocation to Sweden. Lubin's return to the Big Apple Circus in late 2017 was cut short in January 2018 when he admitted to having pressured a sixteen-year-old circus performer to pose for pornographic pictures in 2004.

== Early life ==
Lubin was born on July 3, 1952, in Atlantic City, New Jersey, to Edythe Weinberg Lubin, a homemaker, and George Simon Lubin, an audiovisual engineer. He grew up in nearby Ventnor City, where he was known in school as a "class clown". He graduated from Atlantic City High School and went on to college, intending to establish a career as a television director, based on some of his high school experiences with TV technology.

== Career ==
In 1974, Lubin auditioned at Boston Garden for the Ringling Bros. and Barnum & Bailey Circus's Clown College. The next year, Lubin created the Grandma character at the circus's winter quarters in Florida. The character was designed with an iconic white wig, baggy red dress, and a pearl necklace.

After he left Ringling Bros., Lubin partnered with Dick Monday in 1980 to do stand-up comedy. Their acts included A Couple Guys Who Gotta Do a Show and Pass The Popcorn.

In 1982, Lubin joined the Big Apple Circus, where his Grandma character became the star of the show. In addition to performing, he became the show's Director of Clowning and Production Consultant in 2001.

In 1998, Lubin briefly retired to spend more time with his daughters, but he returned by November 2001. In 2008, Lubin interrupted his time with the circus to undergo chemotherapy for thyroid cancer. This incident was documented in the 2010 PBS documentary Circus, which focused on the Big Apple Circus. By the time Lubin retired from the Big Apple Circus in January 2012, the Grandma character had been seen by more than nine million customers over her 25 seasons with the show.

After retiring in January 2012, Lubin moved to Europe, where he continued to perform. He was a star performer at a winter circus festival in Aachen, Germany, and also taught physical comedy in a Semester at Sea program for students from the University of Virginia. In 2013, he returned his Grandma act to the United States for a three-day show at the Westchester County Center in White Plains, New York as part of a tour with the Royal Hanneford Circus. Lubin also performed in shows in China, Russia, Sweden and Antarctica while living in Europe.

Following the sale of Big Apple Circus after its bankruptcy, it hired Lubin to headline its 40th anniversary show beginning in Fall 2017. The news prompted a former aerialist to contact the new management on January 19, 2018, about an incident involving Lubin in 2004 when she was 16 years old. Her previous attempt to alert the circus in 2012 had no results because Lubin was not with the circus at that time. She said that Lubin had offered her a role with the circus if she modeled for his personal photography business. She went to Lubin's trailer for two photo sessions during which he successfully pressured her into allowing him to take photos of her genitals. Afterwards, Lubin paid her $200 and secured her some freelance work with the circus. Following the accusations, Lubin was immediately placed on leave by the circus and he chose to resign the same day. On January 23, 2018, Lubin released a statement that said the allegations were true, acknowledged that his actions were wrong, and apologized for them.

== Recognition ==
In 2002, Lubin was inducted into the International Clown Hall of Fame and the Sarasota Ring of Fame in 2012, the highest honor in American Circus. In 1999, he was the fifth person to receive the Legend of the Parade Award of Macy's Thanksgiving Day Parade, where he appeared over 15 times. In 2007, he received the Lou Jacobs Lifetime Achievement Award from ClownAlley.

He has performed twice (1977 and 2008) at the International Circus Festival of Monte-Carlo, as well as at the International Circus Festivals in Budapest, in Izhevsk and Moscow, Russia. In addition, Lubin is one of only two American clowns to appear at the Wintercirckus of Circus Krone in Munich.

== Personal life ==
Lubin has two daughters, Danielle and Emily, with his first wife, Roberta, a former performer for Big Apple. In 2008, Lubin underwent chemotherapy for thyroid cancer. Upon his retirement from the Big Apple Circus in 2012, he moved to Stockholm, Sweden with his companion, Ann Hageus, a chiropractor he met in 1990 when she worked for the same circus.
