= Philip Lailson =

British circus proprietor

- Born: Philip Lailson
- Occupation: Showman
- Known for: Horsemanship, Circus street parades
- Notable work: Lailson's Circus
- Awards: Circus Hall of Fame (1962)

Philip Lailson was a showman and circus proprietor who organized the first circus parade in America in 1797. Lailson led a multinational circus troupe of fourteen performers and constructed a vast amphitheatre with a 90-foot dome in Philadelphia, where he staged pantomimes and circus acts from 1797 to 1798. He later brought the concept of the equestrian circus to Mexico in 1802, where he was last traced in 1809. Lailson was inducted into the International Circus Hall of Fame in 1962.

== Biography ==
Lailson began his circus career in equestrian acts, highlighting his horsemanship. After touring Scandinavia, Philip Lailson arrived in America from Stockholm in 1796. His arrival, four years after John Bill Ricketts's American debut, marked the start of their rivalry. Landing at Newport, Rhode Island, in July 1796, his troupe debuted in Boston on August 11, 1796. Lailson's Boston appearance, coinciding with Ricketts's, marked America's first instance of two circuses performing in the same town at once. He led Lailson's Circus, a company of fourteen performers from diverse backgrounds—French, German, Irish, and Italian. Among the performers were two women and a young child of five.

In 1797, Lailson announced the circus's arrival in Philadelphia, by leading America's first recorded circus parade. Lailson and his troupe promoted the circus by parading through Pennsylvania's capital in costume and on horseback.

On Prune Street on present-day Locust Street near Independence National Historical Park, Lailson constructed a vast amphitheatre with a 90-foot dome. Only a few blocks separated Philip Lailson's domed amphitheatre from Ricketts' Chestnut Street venue. His circus opened in Philadelphia on April 8, 1797, hosting pantomimes and circus acts. He later toured Alexandria, Virginia, in September and then followed his rival J. B. Ricketts to New York City in December. He returned to Philadelphia in March 1798 until July 8, 1798. After selling his equipment and amphitheatre in Philadelphia, he moved on to the West Indies.

Lailson brought the concept of the equestrian circus to Mexico in 1802. He was last traced to Mexico in 1809.

== Legacy ==
Philip Lailson originated the tradition of the circus parade in America.

Lailson was inducted into the International Circus Hall of Fame in 1962.
