= Albert Fratellini =

Circus clown (1886–1961)

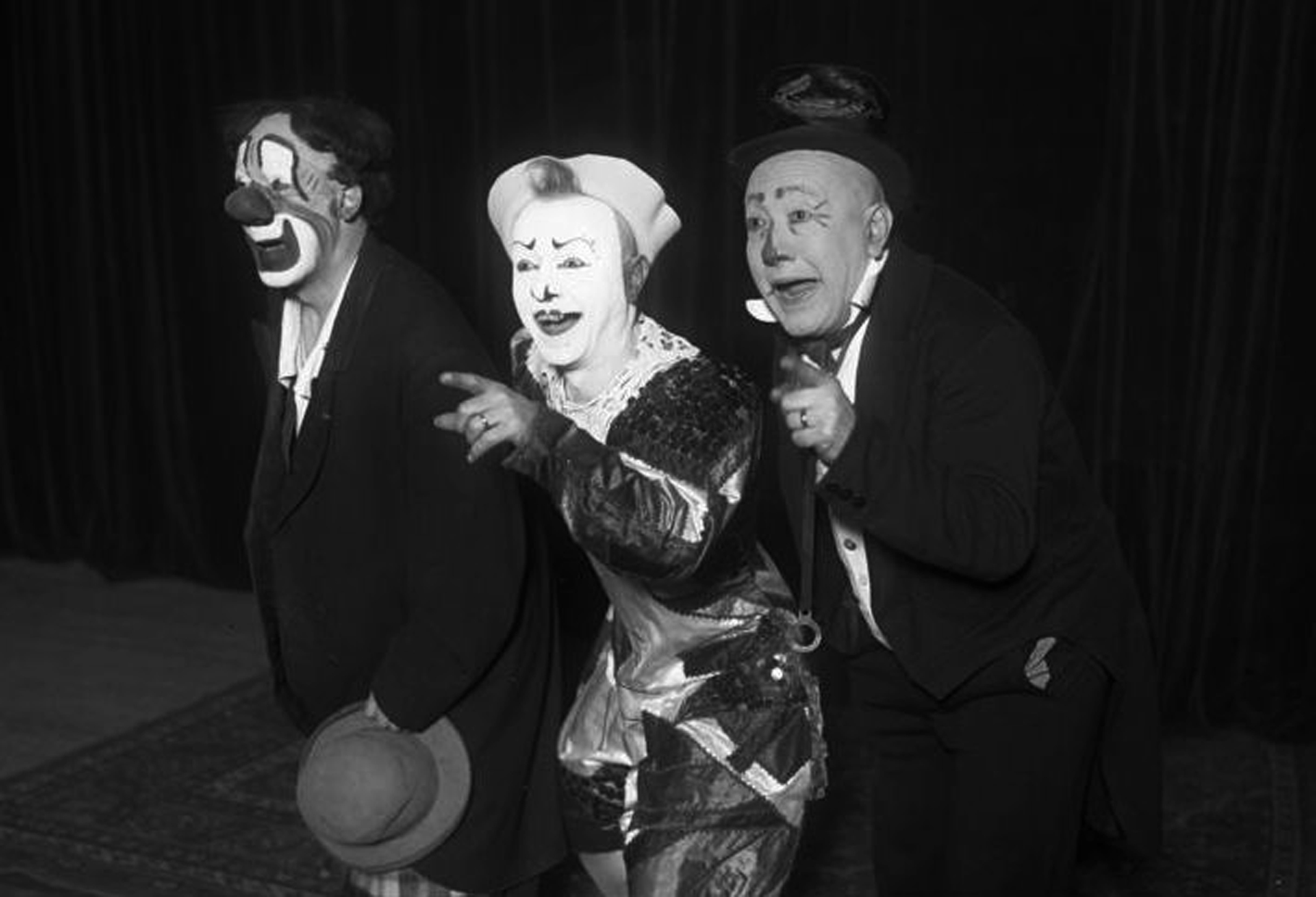
Albert Fratellini, left

Albert Fratellini was a famous circus clown who helped to redefine the role of the Auguste clown type. He was a member of the Fratellini Family. Albert was born in Moscow, Russian Empire, in 1886. He died in Épinay, France, in 1961. He had two brothers: François Fratellini (1879–1951) and Paul Fratellini (1877–1940).
