= François Fratellini =

French circus clown (1879–1951)

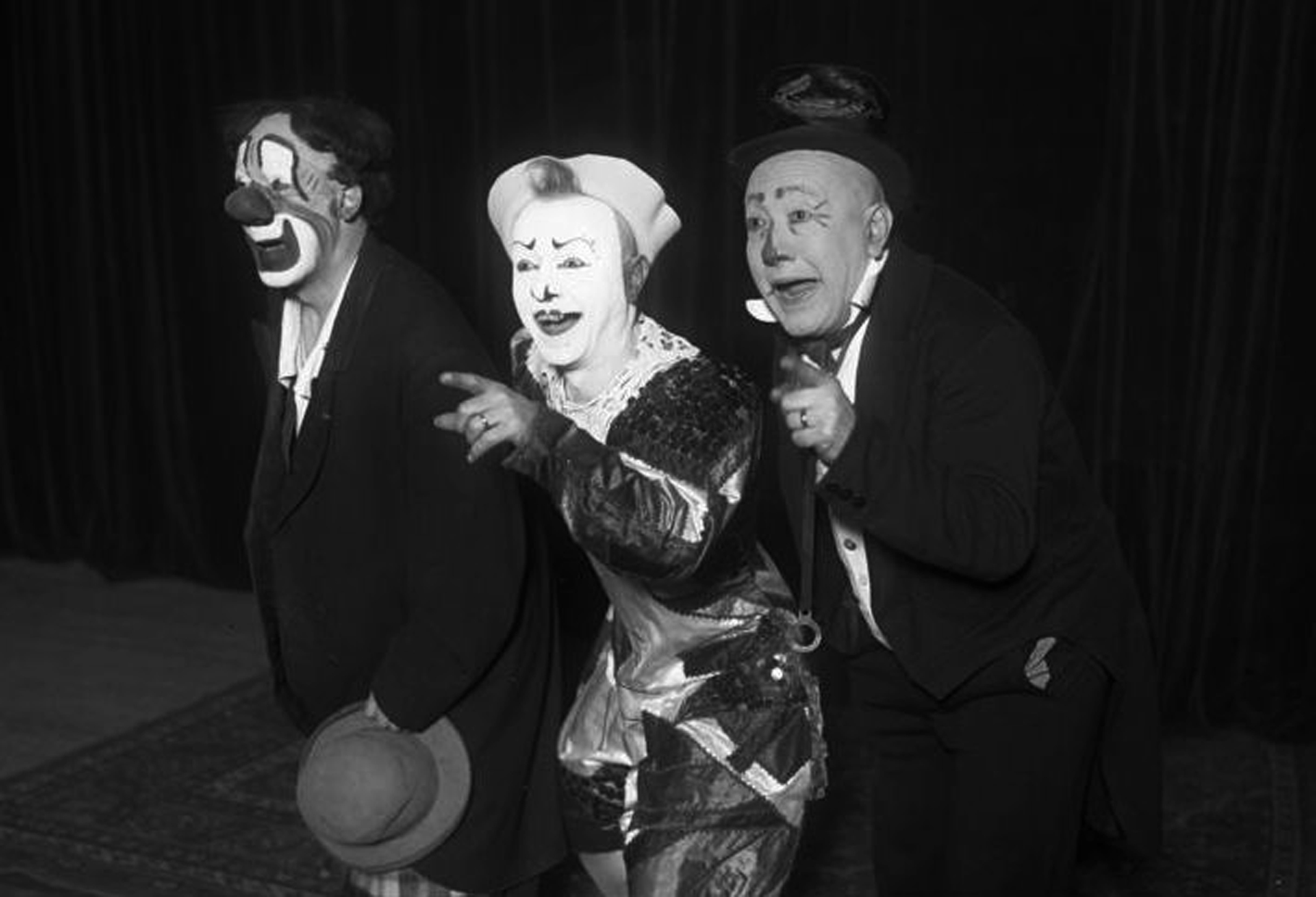
- François Fratellini, centre
- Born: François Fratellini; 1879; Paris, France
- Died: 1951 (aged 71–72); Paris, France
- Occupation: Circus clown
- Relatives: Paul Fratellini and Albert Fratellini (brothers)

François Fratellini (1879–1951) was a French circus clown. He performed as an elegant Whiteface. He was a member of the Fratellini Family. François was born in Paris, in 1879, and died there in 1951. He had two brothers: Paul Fratellini (1877–1940) and Albert Fratellini (1886–1961).
