= Lou Jacobs =

German circus performer

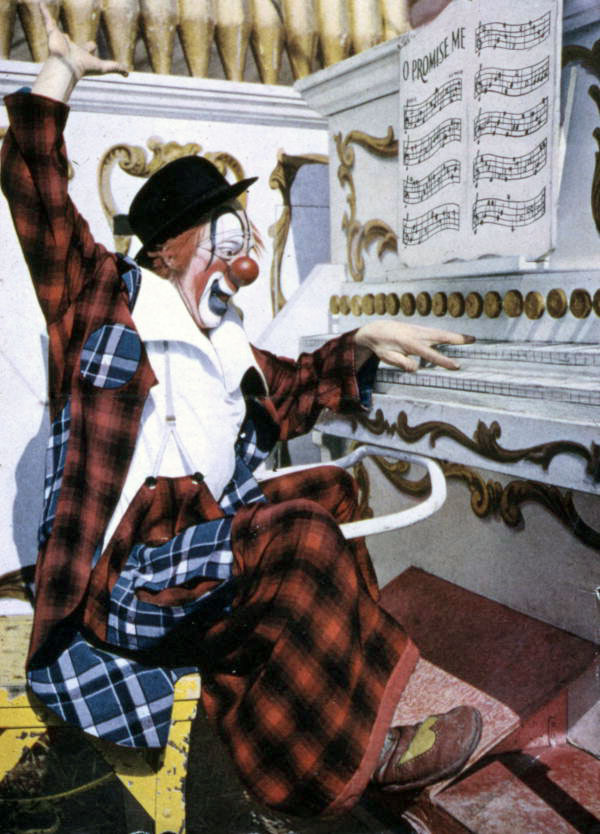
- Jacobs pounding away on a fake calliope
- Born: Johann Ludwig Jacob; January 1, 1903; Bremerhaven, Germany
- Died: September 13, 1992 (aged 89); Sarasota, Florida
- Resting place: Sarasota Memorial Park
- Occupation: Circus clown
- Years active: 1925–1988
- Spouse: Jean Rockwell (1953 – 1992, his death)
- Children: Dolly, Lou Ann

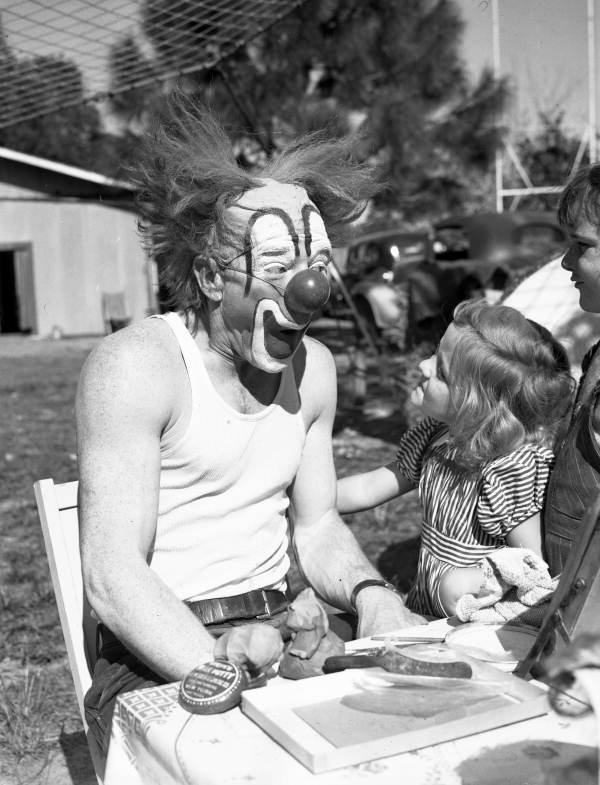
Lou Jacobs in makeup, 1941

Johann Ludwig Jacob (January 1, 1903 – September 13, 1992), professionally known as Lou Jacobs, was a German-born American auguste clown who performed for Ringling Bros. and Barnum & Bailey Circus for more than 60 years. He was inducted into the International Clown Hall of Fame in 1989. He is credited with popularizing the clown car, which has been a staple of circus clown acts ever since. He is also often cited as the originator of the red rubber ball nose, which is used by many clowns today. Jacobs was the first living person to have his portrait appear on an American postage stamp.

== Career in US ==
In 1923, Lou Jacobs came to the U. S. on a steamship. His older brother Karl, had already made it to the U. S. and worked in the Keith Orpheum Theater as a contortionist. He saved up $150.00 to pay for his brother's boat fare. When Jacobs arrived in New York, he had only two dollars and didn't speak any English. Yet, he landed a part in a Belgian acrobatic act that paid $25.00 a week. After almost two years of performing in fairs, outdoor exhibits, and winter vaudeville, Jacobs teamed up with Michael Morris, a British contortionist in late 1924. They did a comedy act that satirized the trapeze acts, a broomstick was their “trapeze.”

Fortunately for Jacobs, Morris had a contract with Ringling Brothers and Barnum and Bailey Circus. Morris was able to bring him into the circus with his act for the 1925 tour. As the year progressed, Jacobs spent more time with the clowns. He eventually got into costume and makeup and worked in some of the production numbers. Starting out as a whiteface clown, he changed to an auguste (clown that has white just around the mouth and eyes) after John Ringling gave him a full-time position as a clown in the 1926 campaign. Jacobs wasted no time in developing his costume. It was a checkered pink and lavender suit with baggy pants and a 12-inch-high (300 mm) collar. He wore big shoes and carried a small umbrella attached to a 10-foot (3.0 m) handle.

Some of Jacobs's early sketches were a satire on the Dempsey-Tunney prizefight, the burning house gag, and the clown wedding. Even though Jacobs excelled in comedy sketches and satires, he was best known for developing several mechanical contraptions. He made himself a one-man band by mounting a bass drum on his back with a pair of sock cymbals on top which crashed on motion. The mallet was attached to the bass drum and activated by a rope connected to Jacobs's right ankle. He wore a special cap with bells rigged on it. To top it off, Jacobs played the harmonica while keeping the bass drum, cymbals and bells going.

Jacobs's most notable mechanical device was the midget car. This act took him about four years to perfect. The first prototypes were made in 1944. After going through some difficulty getting the cars to run, George Wallenda, the famed wire walker, advised him to use a washing machine motor. He also helped Jacobs tailor the small car to his folded-up contorted body by helping him build several cardboard mock-ups. Once they began road testing the car, they discovered that Jacobs had a vision problem after he ran into a tree. The midget car finally made its debut in 1946, only to get scrubbed from the program due to stalling problems.

The act was reentered in the 1947 campaign. Jacobs enhanced the visual contrast between his six-foot-one-inch frame and his tiny twenty-three inch car by making himself a bigger pair of shoes. However, the shoes impaired his vision. He accidentally ran into Jimmy Armstrong, a fellow clown. That collision broke the steering arm to the car, causing another collision into a stage in the center ring. Jacobs could not get out of the car due to the extent of the damage. He had to be towed from the arena while inside the car and was eventually freed with a hacksaw backstage.

In 1948, the perfected midget car was reentered and used in a sketch that became an all-time classic. Jacobs opened the act by racing the loud honking car into the center ring. The car would start to sputter and backfire as he pulled up to a makeshift gas station. Watching Jacobs unfold out of the car was an act all by itself. Once he was out, the gas station attendant, played by Frankie Saluto, insisted that the car was not parked close enough to the pump. Jacobs whacked Frankie over the head with a mallet and a balloon welt rose on his head. The car would sputter and backfire as Jacobs tried to move it closer. He then removed the radiator cap, a snake lunged out and a geyser of water followed. Jacobs sat on the geyser only to have water squirting from the top of his head. When he stopped the flow with his hand, the water squirted out of his mouth. Finally, the car was pushed closer to the pump. Frankie climbed inside the pump and Jacobs threw in a bomb. The explosion sent up a dummy dressed like Frankie and it floated down under a parachute. Jacobs closed the act by making a speedy exit in the midget car in an attempt to evade the pursuing cop played by Jimmy Armstrong.

Jacobs' performance of his clown car act is featured in the 1952 Cecil B. DeMille movie The Greatest Show on Earth.

== Personal life ==
In 1953 he married Jean Rockwell, a former model and circus aerialist. They had two daughters: Dolly, who became a well-known acrobat and trapeze artist, and Lou Ann, an elephant trainer.

== Honours ==
In 1966 he had the distinction of being the only living American to have his image put on a U.S. postage stamp.

== Later career ==
On November 11, 1967, Irvin and Israel Feld and Judge Roy Hofheinz, Jr. pooled their money and bought RB&B&B Circus from John Ringling North for 8 million dollars. The official signing and transfer of ownership was ceremoniously carried out at the ruins of the old Coliseum in Rome. Irvin Feld realized the important role clowns played in the overall success of the Circus. When he acquired the Circus, there were only 14, all over fifty. Irvin Feld wanted to infuse some fresh blood into the Clown Alley. He did this by starting a Clown College in the summer of 1968.

After the school experienced limited success in its inaugural term, Irvin Feld commissioned Bill Ballantine to direct the next class. The first person Bill wanted on his faculty was Lou Jacobs. Bill was well acquainted with Jacobs because he performed with him as a clown in the 1947 and ’48 campaigns. This was not the first time Jacobs taught clowning. He was James Stewart’s tutor when he played a clown in the 1952 Cecil B. DeMille movie, The Greatest Show On Earth. The teaching position at the Clown College had a farther reaching impact because he taught hundreds of young men and women.

Bill Ballantine described Jacobs as an “unselfish and a natural-born teacher.” He was known for his patience and brought out the best in his pupils. They called him “Papa Lou.” His method of instruction was to teach the beginner material that had already been written, then, after the student acquired a feel for the art, he could start writing his own material. Jacobs had an inexhaustible supply of clown sketches for his students. He wrote down every clown sketch he had seen, heard of, or thought of and kept them all in a little black book. There were well over fifty years of material in it.

== Retirement and later life ==
In 1988, after 64 years, Lou Jacobs finally retired from the Circus, but continued teaching at the Clown College. On April 23, 1989, he was one of the first six clowns to be inducted into the recently formed Clown Hall of Fame in Baraboo, Wisconsin. His fellow inductees were: Felix Adler, Otto Griebling, Emmett Kelly, Mark Anthony, and Red Skelton. On September 13, 1992, Lou Jacobs died at age 89 peacefully in his sleep in Sarasota, Florida. Funeral services were held four days later at Sarasota’s First United Methodist Church. The church was packed with circus people from all over the country.

He married Jean Rockwell, a fashion model and an aerialist in 1953. They had two daughters who became accomplished circus stars in their own right. Lou Ann and Dolly Jean performed as show girls with RB&B&B Circus and Billy Lee's Sarasota Sailor Circus. Lou Ann trained elephants with Tommy Hanneford's Royal Hanneford Productions.
