= Paul Fratellini =

French-Italian circus clown (1877–1940)

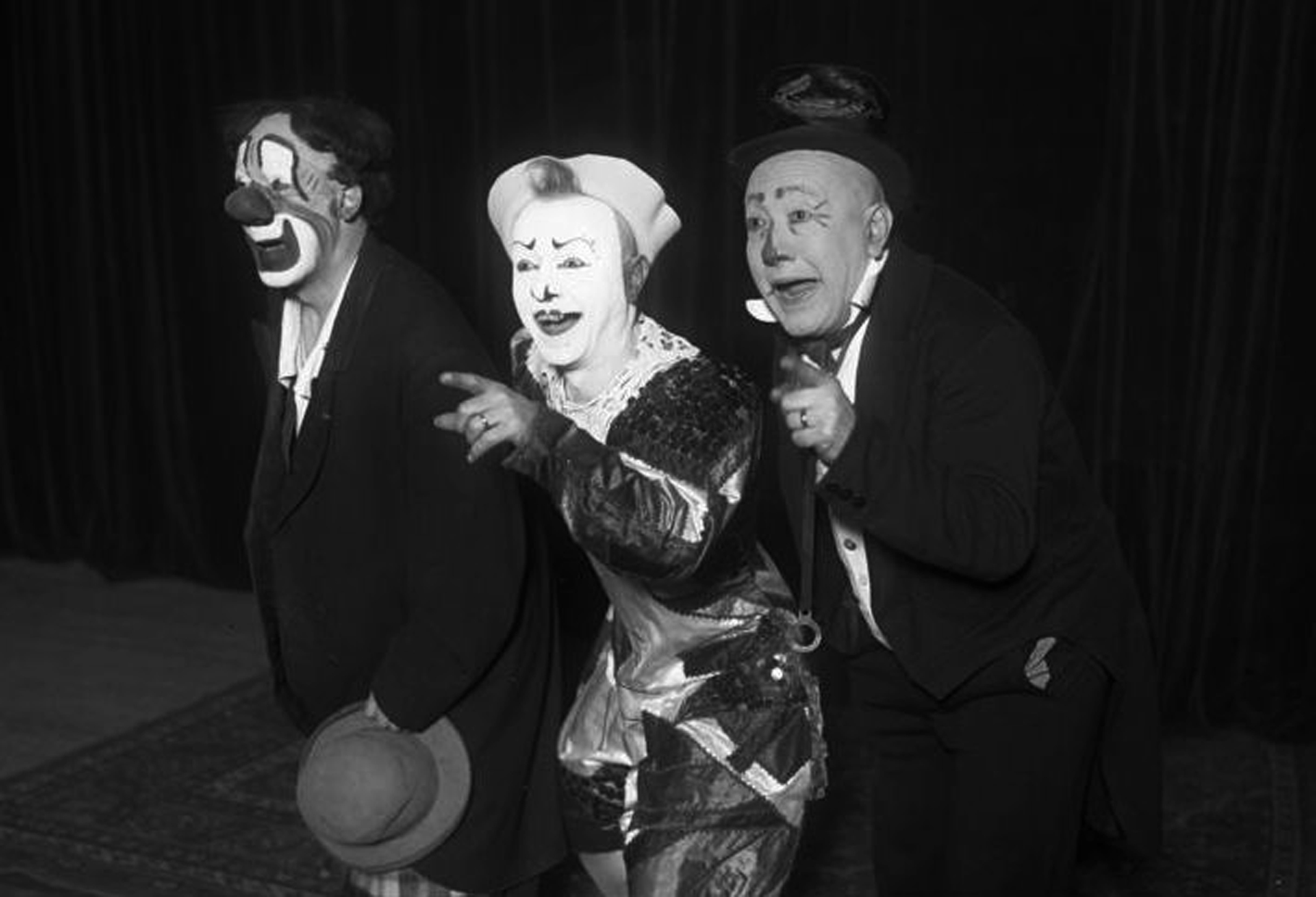
Paul Fratellini, right

Paul Fratellini (1877–1940) was a famous French-Italian circus clown. He was a member of the Fratellini Family. Paul Fratellini was born in Catania and died in Perreux, France. His brothers were François Fratellini and Albert Fratellini.

Paul's son Victor and granddaughter Annie Fratellini followed in his footsteps. In addition, his daughter Violette married Charlie Cairoli, bringing together two great rival clowning families.
