= Albert Hodgini =

Circus performer (1884–1962)

Albert Joseph Henry Hodgini, Sr. (1884–1962) was a circus performer.

== Biography ==
He was born in 1884 to an English family circus troupe, the Hodges, that Italianized their name to make it more exotic for their act. He attended a military and riding school in Germany and appeared with the Albert Schumann Circus in Berlin.

He had as his children: Albert Joseph Henry Hodgini, Jr. and Harriet Hodgini Mazel-Szanto.

He died in 1962.

== Legacy ==
In 1981 the Albert Hodgini Troupe was inducted into the International Circus Hall of Fame.

Albert Hodgini is featured in the book "The Circus Age" by Janet Davis (p. 114-117), including photos of him in drag and with his wife. He played "the Original Miss Daisy" in drag with Ringling Brothers from 1908 to 1914 and was so good at it, that he got a few marriage proposals from men who thought he was a real woman.
