= Annie Fratellini =

French circus artist, singer, film actress and clown (1932–1997)

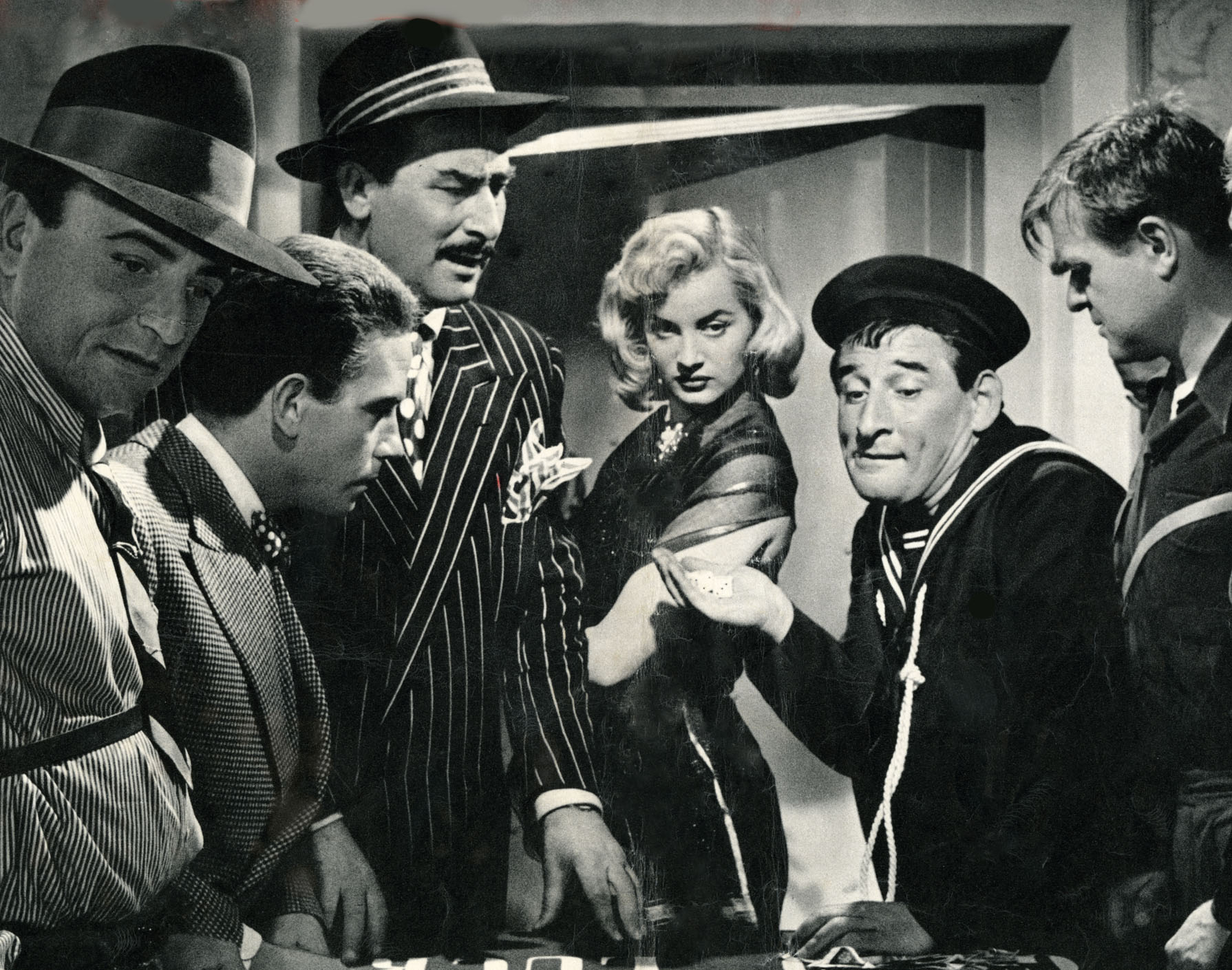
- Fratellini (centre) in Rascel-Fifì (1957)
- Born: Annie Violette Fratellini; November 14, 1932; Algiers, French Algeria
- Died: July 1, 1997 (aged 64); Neuilly-sur-Seine, France
- Occupations: Circus artist; actress; singer; multi-instrumentalist; clown
- Years active: 1934–1987
- Spouses: Pierre Granier-Deferre (m. 1954; div. 19??); Pierre Étaix (m. 1969)
- Children: 1

Annie Violette Fratellini (14 November 1932 – 1 July 1997) was a French circus artist, singer, film actress and clown.

== Biography ==
She was born Annie Violette Fratellini on 14 November 1932, in Algiers, French Algeria, where her parents, who were circus performers, were touring. She was the fourth generation of one of Europe's most illustrious clown dynasties, the Fratellini Family, a French circus family of Italian descent. Her father was Victor Fratellini, a clown and acrobat; her mother, Suzanne (née Rousseau), was the daughter of Gaston Rousseau, the director of the Cirque de Paris, a huge circus building located Avenue de la Motte-Picquet in Paris that was active from 1906 to 1930. Her grandfather was Paul Fratellini, one of the Fratellini brothers, the legendary clown trio that was the Toast of Paris (and Europe) between the two world wars.

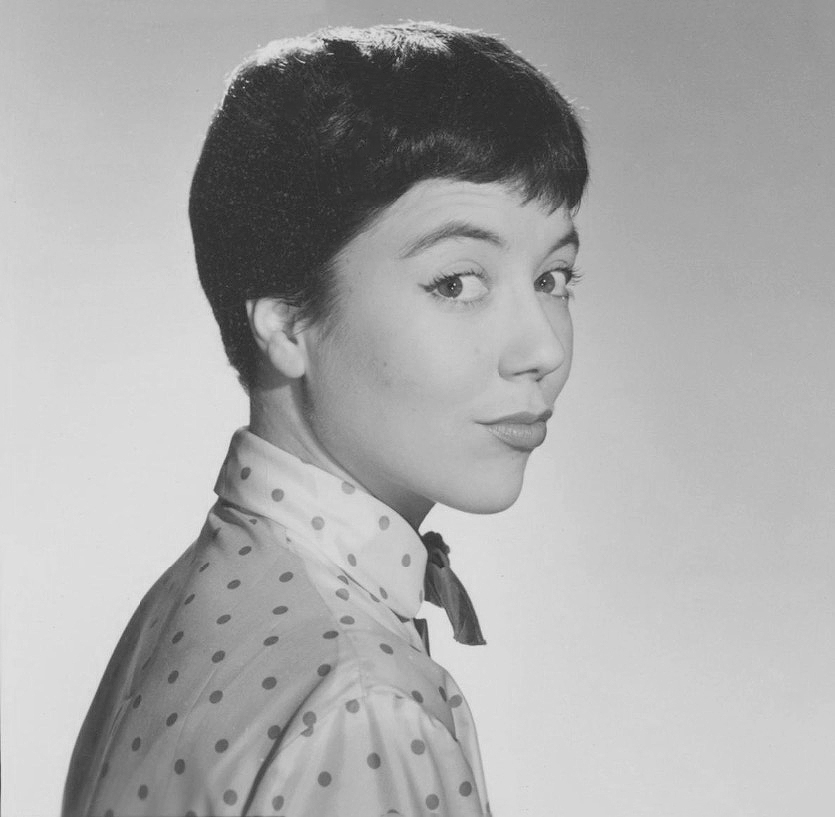
Annie Fratellini in 1965

Although she made her debut in the ring at age 13 at the famous Cirque Medrano in Paris, she eventually ran away from the circus when she was 18 years old, and begun a music-hall and recording career as a musician and singer. She also became a film actress, appearing notably in 1965 in La Métamorphose des cloportes a film directed by Pierre Granier-Deferre (1927–2007), whom she had married in 1954. They had one daughter, Valérie.

In 1969, she starred in Pierre Étaix's Le grand amour. They fell in love and married that same year. Pierre Étaix (1928–2016), who had been a comedian and Jacques Tati's assistant before becoming a filmmaker himself, had a passion for the circus and clowns. Annie Fratellini had an inherited talent for comedy, and Pierre Étaix convinced her to take it seriously. Together, they created a classic European clown duo in which Étaix was the Clown to Fratllini's Auguste (the comic character of the duet). They made their debut on tour with the French Cirque Pinder.

In 1975, Étaix and Fratellini opened the École Nationale du Cirque, one of Paris's (and Europe's) first two professional circus schools, and created the Nouveau Cirque de Paris, an intimate, high-end traveling circus that was the performing arm of the school, and in which they regularly performed their act. Pierre Étaix and Annie Fratellini divorced in 1987, and Annie continued to run the school and the circus, performing her clown act with her daughter, Valérie. The school has become the Académie Fratellini, one of France's two major state-sponsored circus schools.

== Death ==
Annie Fratellini died from cancer on 1 July 1997, at Neuilly-sur-Seine and is buried at the Cimetière de Montmartre in Paris, France, near the other members of her illustrious family.

== Selected filmography ==
Select filmography for Fratellini.

- And Your Sister? (1958)
- All the Gold in the World (1961)
- Le Pas de Trois (1964)
- La Métamorphose des cloportes (1965)
- Le Grand Amour (1969)
