= Otto Griebling =

German-born circus clown

- Born: April 28, 1896; Koblenz, Germany
- Died: April 19, 1972 (aged 75); New York City, US
- Resting place: Sarasota, Florida
- Occupation: Circus clown
- Spouse(s): Hanna (divorced 1948); Anna
- Children: 3

Otto Griebling (April 28, 1896 – April 19, 1972) was a German-born circus clown who performed for many years with the Cole Brothers and Ringling Bros. and Barnum & Bailey Circuses. He was one of four clowns given the title Master Clown by Irvin Feld.

== Early years ==
Otto Griebling was born April 28, 1896, in Koblenz, Germany. There he was introduced to the circus business, as well as ballet and opera. Following the death of his father, his mother emigrated to the United States ahead of her children. His older brother Emil (b. 1894) worked his way overseas on a boat, eventually working on Wall Street. Young Otto worked his way to the United States by boat in 1911.

After arriving in America, Griebling left home after reading an ad seeking apprentice bareback riders. He studied under and worked with Albert Hodgini in Baraboo, Wisconsin, for several years, performing in Hodgini's act in the Sells Floto Circus and other circuses.

Griebling changed his performance area in 1930 after suffering a serious fall. He developed a silent tramp clown character, an act that he would perform as a clown. He would walk around the circus holding a slab of ice asking for Miss Jones. When he didn't find her, he would come around again, this time the ice slab was smaller, finally he would find Miss jones but as he handed the ice to her, it would melt away right in her hand! He signed on as a clown with the Hagenbeck-Wallace Circus in 1932. He was a clown with the Cole Brothers Circus from their first tour in 1935, eventually becoming Cole Brothers' head clown before he joined the Ringling Bros. and Barnum & Bailey Circus in 1951.

Griebling spent the rest of his circus career with Ringling, going on strike in 1956 with Emmett Kelly and later teaching to the first few classes of the Ringling Bros. and Barnum & Bailey Clown College. He appeared as Jimmy Durante's stunt double in the 1962 film Jumbo. In 1970 Otto had his larynx removed due to cancer, but it did not affect his silent act.

== Marriage ==
Otto Griebling, Sr. was married twice. His first wife, Hanna, was a fellow circus performer; they had three children together and divorced in 1948. His second wife, Anna, relocated with him to Venice, Florida, in 1961. She died in 2005. They had the following children:

- Elsa Griebling Gable (?-1971)
- Joan Griebling Simons
- Otto Griebling, Jr.

== Death ==
Griebling died on April 19, 1972, from a stroke following a brief illness for which he was hospitalized at Saint Clare's Hospital in New York City. He was buried at Sarasota Memorial Park in Sarasota, Florida.

== Legacy ==
Griebling was inducted into the International Circus Hall of Fame in 1973. and the International Clown Hall of Fame in 1989.
