= Cole Bros. Circus =

American circus

The Cole Bros. Circus was a medium-sized American circus. It was founded in 1884 as "W.W. Cole's New Colossal Shows", by William Washington Cole. Ownership of this circus was passed around and in 1900 the Circus was bought by two Canadian showmen, Martin and James Down which was when the name was changed to Cole Bros. Circus. In the 1930s, the circus employed two noted animal trainers, Clyde Beatty and Allen King, both of whom traveled in their own railroad cars. During their shows the Cole Bros. Circus would often parade from their 35 large cars in the rail yards to where the circus was being performed. A 1935 image shows the flatcars and stock cars that the circus used to travel. The stock cars had elephants and baggage horses. This scene was seen daily, morning and night, as the circus traveled. 1935 was the first year Beatty was associated with the Cole Bros. Circus and they visited town all across the United States. Another well-known performer with the circus was Bob Strehlau Juggles the Clown. In 1957 the show was renamed Clyde Beatty Cole Bros. Circus and bought by the Acme Circus Operating Corporation, an organization formed by Jerry Collins, Frank McColsky, Randolph Calhoun, and Walter Kernan. The Clyde Beatty-Cole Bros. Circus was then the largest tent show on the road at that time.

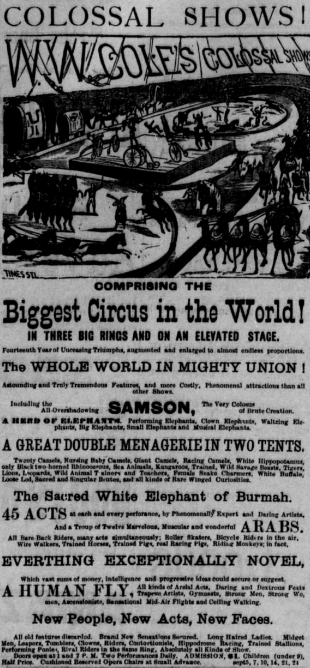
1884 advertisement

By 2014, Cole Bros. Circus was one of the few traditional circuses in the United States that remained under the big top tent. In 2016, the show was essentially defunct, largely in response to animal rights activists advocating against the use of animals for live performances.

In 1940, in Fulton County, Indiana, a fire killed many of the animals in the Cole Brothers circus. Throughout most of the Cole Bros. Circus's time they had many incidents not meeting the minimal federal standards for the care of animals as established in Animal Welfare Act. They failed to provide veterinary care, adequate shelter from the elements, proper food and water, as well as failing to handle the animals in a way that would prevent trauma, and harm, and ensure public safety.

The Circus had a lot of issues providing for one specific elephant named Jewel throughout at least 2004–2011. They frequently were cited by the USDA due to lack of veterinary care and proper food and water for the physically ill elephant. In June 2004 there was even an eyewitness to an elephant handler beating Jewel across the head with a PVC pipe. The circus also had many instances of animals escaping, one of the most recent being in April 2010 when an elephant named Viola ran away from her handlers. There was a frequent amount of animals who ran away or tried to escape this circus from elephants to tigers.

== Alternative names ==
- W.W. Cole's New Colossal Shows
- Clyde Beatty-Cole Bros. Circus
- Cole Bros. Circus
- Cole Bros. Circus World’s Largest Circus Under The Big Top
- Cole Bros. Circus of the Stars

== Performers ==
Many performers traveled with Cole Bros. Circus. In 1908, featured on a herald as performing were the Seven Bostock-Sangers, the Heuman Family, Professor Charles Tinney's Concert Band, and prominently Mlle. De Zizi. On a herald published in 1959, Pinito De Oro, Gallaso, Tonito, 8 Moroccans, Beatty, Flying Palustres and Hugo Zacchini were some other performers highlighted. Some additional performers who traveled and/or performed with the circus over time were the Flying Thrillers, the Imperial Harolds, the Esqueda Family, Harietta, the Nelson Family, J. M. Christiansen, Cese O'Dell, Harold Barnes, Rozina and Estrella.

The aerialist Eva Clark performed with the circus until her death in 1906.

== Advertising techniques ==
The Cole Bros. Circus used many advertising formats in order to draw as much attention and customers as possible. One of the advertising techniques they used the most were heralds. The Cole Bros. Circus heralds often did not have color. These posters often talked about how incredibly enormous the circus was in performance quality and in comparison to other circuses. The posters included quotes such as, "FUN FOR THE WHOLE FAMILY - STUPENDOUSLY PRESENTING THE WORLD'S FAMOUS, BIGGEST AND GREATEST FEATURES", "THIS COUNTRY'S REPRESENTATIVE AMUSEMENT, ENDORSED BY THE CRITICS OF THE UNIVERSE" and "BIGGEST AND BEST CIRCUS IN THE WORLD". Some posters featured lions and said "GREATEST SHOW ON EARTH." They used bright reds and yellows to help advertise the circus.

== Visited by the Cole Bros. Circus (1935) ==
- Benton Harbor, Michigan
- Marietta, Ohio
- Falls City, Nebraska
- Little Rock, Arkansas

== Known for ==
The Cole Bros. Circus, like most other American circuses in the 1930s, would set up side poles, dozens of feet tall, to put a big tent on top. Nevertheless, although intriguingly enormous, this was a common scene. However, in the 1930s the Cole Bros. railroad circus was known for its giant street parade from the railroad yard to the circus grounds.

In 1987, they appeared on Episode 1585 of Mister Rogers' Neighborhood, receiving a Special Thanks in the credits. As part of the episode, several performances segments are shown including jugglers, acrobats, elephants and various clowns, as well as ringleader Jimmy James.

== See also ==
- List of circuses and circus owners
- Clyde Beatty
- William Washington Cole
