= Felix Adler (clown) =

American clown

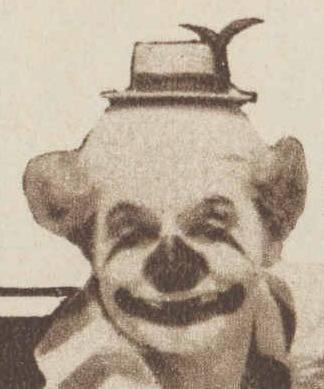
- Born: Frank Bartlet Adler; June 17, 1895; Clinton, Iowa
- Died: February 1, 1960 (aged 64); New York, New York
- Resting place: Springdale Cemetery in Clinton
- Other names: King of Clowns; The White House Clown
- Occupation: Circus performer
- Spouse: Amelia Irwin
- Children: None

Frank Bartlet Adler (better known by his stage name Felix Adler; June 17, 1895 – February 1, 1960), was an American circus performer and entertainer. Known as "The King of Clowns", he performed for Ringling Bros. Barnum & Bailey for 20 years. He was inducted into the International Clown Hall of Fame in 1989.

== Life ==
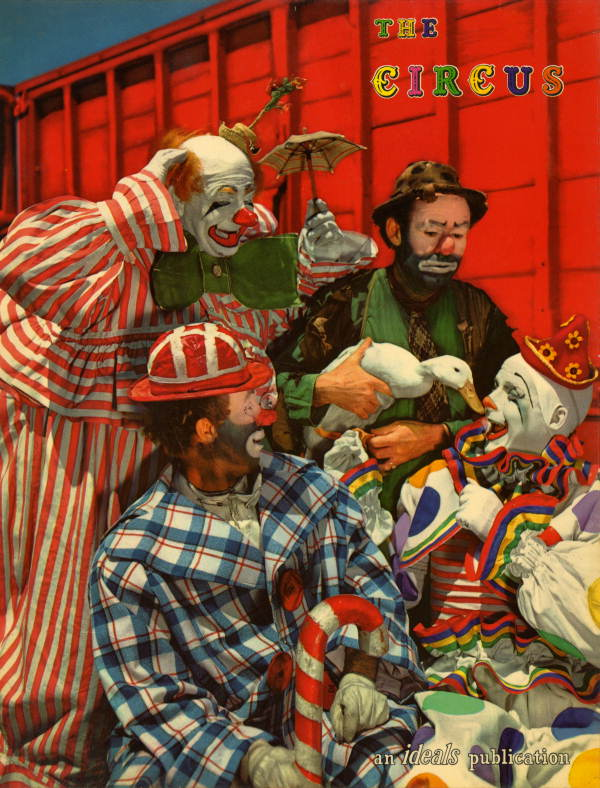
Clockwise from top left: Felix Adler, Emmett Kelly, Harry Dann, and Paul Jerome

Felix Adler was born in Clinton, Iowa on June 17, 1895. He became interested in performing at age 9, when a circus visited his hometown.

Adler and his wife, Amelia, ran the first American husband-and-wife independent circus, and he was the first clown to appear on television.

Amelia Adler appeared, in costume and makeup, as a guest on April 10, 1955 episode of the American television quiz program, What's My Line? Adler also appears as a clown in the 1952 film The Greatest Show on Earth.

In addition to his "King Of Clowns" moniker, Adler was known as "The White House Clown" for his number of command performances before United States Presidents.

His outlandish costumes often featured a huge grossly exaggerated posterior, made from two inflated beach balls held in place by a brassiere-like canvas sling.

Identified in the annals of Clowndom as a "Whiteface" clown, his exclusive "face" was easily differentiated from other clowns by a sparkling rhinestone embedded in the tip of his red putty nose.

During his career, Adler performed before millions of circus fans in the United States.

His image was placed onto at least three classic Ringling Bros. and Barnum & Bailey Circus posters, and a commercial mask resembling this face was created and sold by Verne Langdon.

He died at Saint Clare's Hospital in New York on February 1, 1960, following surgery on an ulcer. He is buried in Springdale Cemetery in Clinton, Iowa.

== Recognition ==
Adler was once photographed by American designer Charles Eames for the latter's visual slide presentation accompanied by circus music, a photograph which today retains fame in the form of a cover for the compact disc Circus Clown Calliope! Vols. 1&2.

He was inducted into the International Clown Hall of Fame in 1989.

Felix Adler is also honored by Clinton's Children Museum, it being named after him. The museum is one of only 5 in Iowa and is a staple in the Clinton & Fulton communities.
