= List of clowns =

This is a list of notable clowns.

== Circus-style ==
- Lulu Adams - early 20th century British female clown
- Albert Alter - American clown
- António Branco – Batatinha (literally Little Potato), from Portugal
- Arthur Vercoe Pedlar – "Vercoe", an English clown
- Barry Lubin – "Grandma", star clown of the Big Apple Circus
- Bim Bom – clown duo of early 20th Century Russia
- Carequinha – Brazilian clown and actor, born in a circus to a circus family Brazil
- Cepillín – Mexican clown
- Cha-U-Kao - French clown, performer at the Moulin Rouge
- Charlie Bell – American clown, Ringling Bros. circus
- Charlie Cairoli – Italian-born British clown
- Pinto Colvig - American clown who later became famous as the voice of Goofy.
- Daniel Rice (1823–1901) – American clown of the 19th century and principal inspiration for Uncle Sam.
- David Shiner – Tony Award-winning American born mime and circus clown who has appeared on Broadway and with several European circuses
- Demetrius Nock – "Bello Nock," star clown in Ringling Brothers Barnum and Bailey Circus
- Dimitri – Swiss clown and mime
- Emmett Kelly – American tramp clown
- Frankie Saluto – American clown, Ringling Bros. circus
- The Fratellini Family – family of French clowns
- George Carl – American clown who performed mainly in Europe.
- Glen "Frosty" Little – America's last living Master Clown and longtime "Boss Clown" with the Ringling Brothers and Barnum and Bailey Circus
- Greg and Karen DeSanto – husband and wife clown/comedy team
- Grock – Charles Adrien Wettach (1880–1959), Swiss clown
- Joe Jackson Sr. and Jr. – tramp clown entree with a breakaway bicycle
- Johann Ludwig Jacob Lou Jacobs (1903–1992) – American Master Clown. Credited with inventing the clown car gag.
- Josep Andreu i Lasserre – Charlie Rivel European clown
- Jose de Jesus Medrano – Chuchin (1953–1984), Mexican clown and performance star
- José Vega Santana – Remi (1958–) – "Puerto Rico's Greatest Clown"
- Michael Halvarson – Swedish clown and star pickpocket entertainer who has appeared in Cirque du Soleil Kooza
- Mikhail Nikolayevich Rumyantsev – Karandash (1901–1983), Soviet Clown and clowning teacher.
- Nicolai Poliakoff – Coco the Clown longtime star clown of the Bertram Mills Circus
- Oleg Popov (1930–2016), Russian clown, student of Karandash
- Otto Griebling – (1896–1972), American Master Clown with the Cole Bros. and Ringling circuses

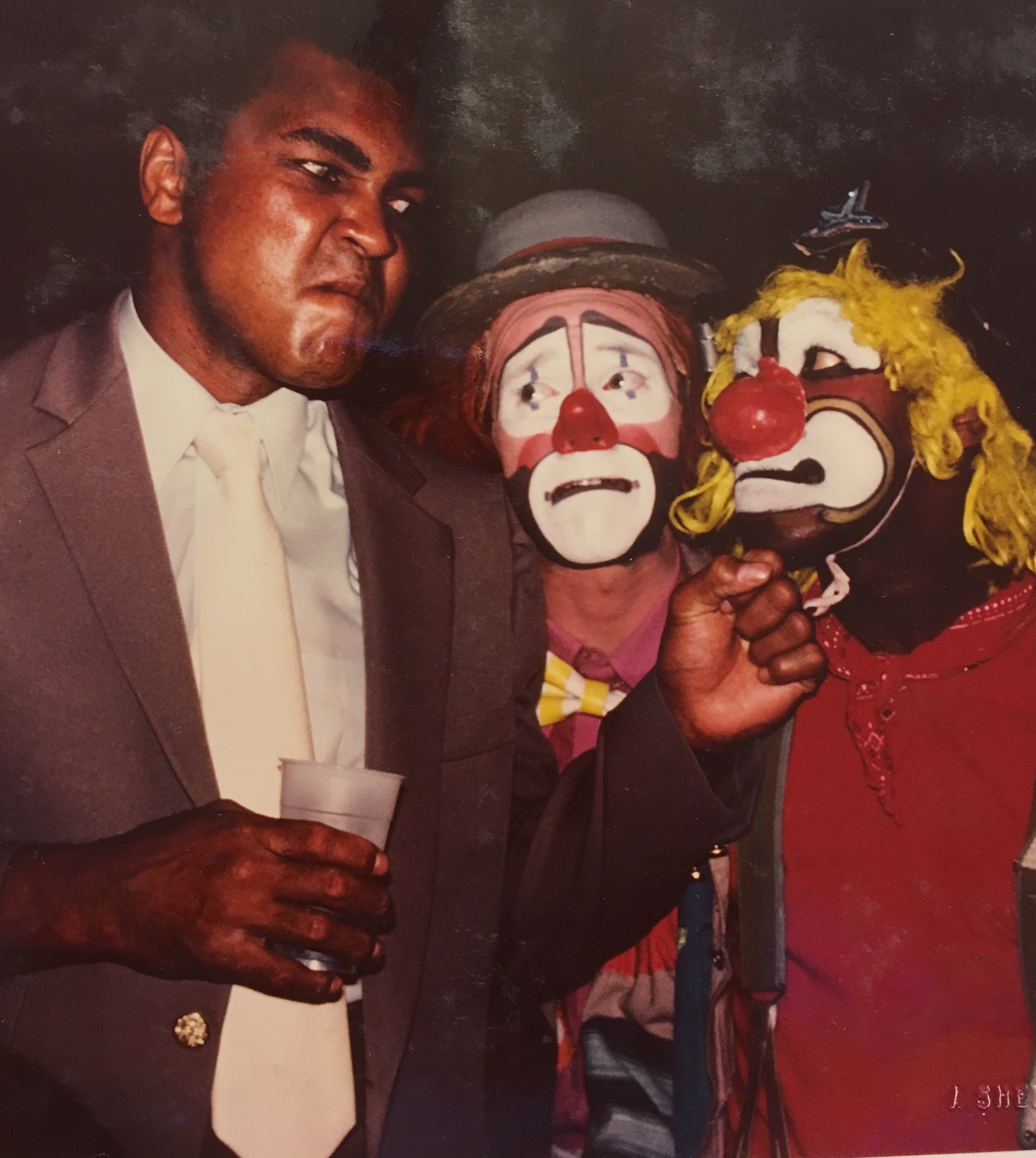
Muhammad Ali with clowns Charlie Frye and Skeeter Reece in 1980

- Paul Hunt – gymnast clown
- Pierre Étaix (1928–2016), French clown, comedian and filmmaker
- Pogo the Clown - American serial killer John Wayne Gacy, who volunteered as a clown at hospitals
- Rafael Padilla – Cuban-born clown, performing in France as "Chocolat"
- Roly Bain (1954 – 2016) English priest and clown who preached and performed as Holy Roly. He helped set up the organisation Holy Fools.
- Sergey Pavlov – "Lalala", Russian clown, director and actor
- Skeeter Reece – American clown
- Steve Smith – "T.J. Tatters", longtime director of Ringling Clown College
- Tiririca - Brazilian clown who started his career in the circus, later becoming a singer, gaining fame on TV and becoming a politician
- Vicki Gabereau – Rosie Sunshine, ran as a candidate in the 1974 Toronto mayoral election
- Yuri Nikulin – Russian clown and actor
- Jack Perry and Doug McKenzie – Zig and Zag Australian television clowns

== Rodeo ==
- Flint Rasmussen – seven-time winner of Man in the Can award.
- Johnny Tatum – American rodeo clown
- Quail Dobbs – American rodeo clown
- Slim Pickens – American rodeo clown and film actor.

== Film ==
- Abbott and Costello (William (Bud) Abbott, 1897–1974; Louis Costello, 1906–1959) – American comedy duo specializing in the white clown (straight man)/red clown (comic) relationship
- Ben Turpin (September 19, 1869 – July 1, 1940) – cross-eyed comedian, best remembered for his work in silent films
- Buster Keaton (October 4, 1895 – February 1, 1966) – "The Great Stoneface"
- Charlie Chaplin (April 16, 1889 – December 25, 1977) – British born comedian. His principal character was "The Little Tramp"
- Chester Conklin (January 11, 1886 – October 11, 1971) – American comedian and actor
- Harry Langdon (June 15, 1884 – December 22, 1944) – American silent film comedian and mime
- Jacques Tati (October 9, 1908 – November 5, 1982) – French comedian, mime and filmmaker; played the socially inept Monsieur Hulot
- Keystone Cops – incompetent group of policemen created by Mack Sennett for his Keystone Film Company between 1912 and 1917
- Laurel and Hardy – comedy duo in film
- Martin and Lewis – American comedy duo, comprising singer Dean Martin (as the "straight man") and comedian Jerry Lewis (as his stooge)
- The Marx Brothers – team of sibling comedians that appeared in vaudeville, stage plays, film and television
- Peter Sellers (September 8, 1925 – July 24, 1980) – English comedian and actor; played Inspector Clouseu
- Roscoe "Fatty" Arbuckle (March 24, 1887 – June 29, 1933) – actor, was involved in the "Fatty Arbuckle scandal"
- Shaggy 2 Dope – DJ of the Insane Clown Posse, Detroit-based hip-hop group with a fan army of "schizophrenic wizards" called the juggalos and star of underground film Big Money Hustlaz
- Slim Pickens – rodeo clown and film actor
- Snub Pollard (November 9, 1889 – January 19, 1962) – silent film comedian, popular in the 1920s
- The Three Stooges – slapstick comedians
- W.C. Fields (January 29, 1880 – December 25, 1946) – American comedian and actor
- Violent J – leader of the Insane Clown Posse, a Detroit-based hip-hop group and star of Big Money Hustlaz underground film.
- Jim Varney - Actor of Ernest P. Worrell

== Television ==
- Lucille Ball – I Love Lucy, The Lucy-Desi Comedy Hour, The Lucy Show, Here's Lucy
- Bassie – clown on the Dutch "Bassie & Adriaan" television series, played by Bas van Toor
- Benny Hill – The Benny Hill Show
- Milton Berle – Texaco Star Theater, Berle's Buick Hour
- Blinky the Clown – played by Russell Scott as the star of "Blinky's Fun Club" in Colorado, Denver.
- Bozo the Clown – franchised character played by many local television performers and on cartoons, based on the character created in 1946 by Alan W. Livingston for Capitol Records' record-reader series
- Bubbles the Clown – clown doll that appears on BBC test cards F, J & W.
- Charlie Chalk – main character of the British children's TV series of the same name.
- Clarabell the Clown – regular character from the Howdy Doody television program, originally played by Bob Keeshan of Captain Kangaroo fame.
- Der Clown - German TV clown
- Doink the Clown – gimmick used by several wrestlers in the 1990s. Doink began as a heel wrestler in the evil clown archetype, but later Doinks portrayed the character as a babyface who loved to entertain the children in the crowd.
- Dink the Clown – midget sidekick of Doink the Clown.
- Flunky the Clown – Character of comedy writer Jeff Martin on Late Night With David Letterman .
- Herman the Clown - main character of Finnish series Pelle Hermanni.
- Homey the Clown – character from the In Living Color television program, whose famous catchphrase was "Homey don't play that (or dat)".
- John Michael Howson – 'clown' from Adventure Island.
- Nasse Setä – Character of Finnish comedian Vesa-Matti Loiri
- Loonette the Clown - main character of Canadian series The Big Comfy Couch.
- Mr. Noodle – character created by Bill Irwin for the "Elmo's World" segment of Sesame Street
- Mr Tumble – character on Something Special, played by Justin Fletcher
- Patati Patatá – Brazilian TV
- J. P. Patches – Seattle children's television mainstay for decades.
- Paul Reubens – Pee-wee Herman, Pee-Wee's Playhouse.
- Peppi & Kokki - Two Dutch clowns who starred in their own children's TV series.
- Pinky Lee – The Pinky Lee Show
- Pipo de Clown – main character of the Dutch children's TV series of the same name.
- Piñón Fijo – Argentine TV
- Red Skelton – The Red Skelton Show
- Roberto Gómez Bolaños - Better known as Chespirito, he created and played El Chavo and El Chapulín Colorado
- Rowan Atkinson – Mr. Bean
- Jim Allen – Rusty Nails (1957–1972), Pacific Northwest children's television clown, and model (in part) for Matt Groening's "Krusty" character on the television program The Simpsons
- Sid Caesar – Your Show of Shows and Caesar's Hour
- Soupy Sales – The Soupy Sales Show
- Yucko the Clown – The Howard Stern Show, known for rude observations, obscenities and public intoxication
- Os Trapalhões - Didi, Dedé, Mussum and Zacarias, from the TV show of the same name.
- Zig and Zag (Australian performers)

== Theatrical ==
- A. Robins – vaudeville's "The Banana Man" and "One Man Music Shop"
- Alan Clay – international clown teacher and performer; author of Angels Can Fly, a Modern Clown User Guide
- Alex Tatarsky – American vaudeville-style bouffon performer based in New York and Philadelphia
- Alex the Jester – "King of Jesters," speaks a contemporary version of the medieval gibberish language Grammelot.
- Andy Kaufman – American comic and practitioner of anti-humor
- Avner Eisenberg – also known as Avner the Eccentric, a "Broadway" clown
- Bill Irwin – Tony Award-winning clown known for his new vaudeville-style performances
- Blue Man Group – trio of silent characters that perform covered in blue paint
- Clark and McCullough – Bobby Clark and Paul McCullough started as circus clowns and progressed to be stars of stage and screen
- Sylvester the Jester – The Human Cartoon
- Dario Fo – Capo Comicio, creator of "Mistero Buffo" and "Accidental Death of an Anarchist"; recipient of the 1997 Nobel Prize in Literature; uses Arlecchino stage persona, political activist
- Ed Wynn – The Perfect Fool
- Eric Davis – Cirque du Soleil clown and creator of Red Bastard
- Geoff Hoyle – stage clown, started in the Pickle Family Circus with Bill Irwin and Larry Pisoni
- George Carl – longtime star of the Crazy Horse Saloon in Paris
- George Washington Lafayette Fox, American stage clown during the 19th century
- James and Jamesy, Canadian clown duo
- Jango Edwards – American clown and entertainer in the European cabaret tradition
- John Gilkey – Cirque du Soleil clown
- Joseph Grimaldi – credited with being "the first whiteface clown" — in an homage to Grimaldi, circus clowns began referring to themselves and each other as "Joey"s, and the term 'joey' is now a synonym for clown
- Marceline Orbes (1874–1927) – performed in Europe and for many years at the New York Hippodrome.
- Morro and Jasp – Canadian clown duo
- Mump and Smoot – Canadian "clowns of horror"
- Olsen and Johnson – stars of Broadway's Hellzapoppin'
- Puddles Pity Party (Michael Geier) – American traditional popular singer and YouTube celebrity who performs as a whiteface clown. Billed as the "sad clown with the golden voice."
- Richard Pochinko – founder of "Canadian Clowning" style
- Richard Tarlton – actor and clown in the Elizabethan theatre in England
- Richard Usher – 19th-century clown, performed at Astley's Amphitheatre
- Robert Armin – actor and clown in Shakespeare's company
- Sergey Pavlov – Russian clown "LALALA", creator of "LALALA SHOW"
- Slava Polunin – Russian-born clown and creator of "Slava's Snowshow"
- Spike Jones and his City Slickers – American musical act featuring slapstick circus-style comedy
- Thomas Monckton – award-winning physical clown
- Tommy Cooper – British comedy magician
- W. C. Fields – vaudeville comedy star
- Will Kempe (fl. c 1589–1600) – actor dancer and clown who worked with Shakespeare; famously jigged his way from Norwich to London in 1600
- Wolfe Bowart – stage clown touring internationally with his productions LaLaLuna and The Shneedles

== Fictional ==
- Adam the Clown – from the video game Dead Rising. Equipped with two chainsaws that he juggles, he is a boss in the game.
- Binky the Clown – from the Garfield comic by Jim Davis.
- Buggy the Clown – an antagonist of the manga One Piece
- Buttons the Clown – a central character from the 1952 film The Greatest Show on Earth, played by James Stewart
- Calvero – clown character played Charlie Chaplin in the film Limelight
- Captain Spaulding – from the horror films House of 1000 Corpses and The Devil's Rejects
- Chuckles the Clown – Mary Tyler Moore Show background character who was trampled to death in an episode
- Colly Wobble, a clown toy in CBeebies TV show Moon and Me
- Crackers the Clown, played by Peter Brocco – "bad-guy" clown in the Adventures of Superman episode titled "The Clown Who Cried".
- Dodo Delwyn – once a famous Ziegfeld star, is reduced to playing clowns in burlesque and amusement parks in 1953 film The Clown; played by Red Skelton
- Dr. Rockso – the Rock & Roll Clown from Metalocalypse
- Fatso the Clown – clown statue in The 70s Show episode titled "Fun It"
- Fizbo the Clown - Cam Tucker's clown character from Modern Family.
- Frenchy the Clown – character of the national lampoon comic Evil clown comics series.
- Fun Gus the Laughing Clown - cursed character in the cosmic/folk horror novel, "The Cursed Earth" by D.T. Neal (Nosetouch Press, 2022).
- The Ghost Clown – evil hypnotist clown featured in the Scooby-Doo, Where Are You! episode titled "Bedlam in the Big Top"
- Gamzee Makara – clown-like Highblood Troll and one of the antagonists of the webcomic Homestuck
- Geiru Toneido – minor antagonist in Phoenix Wright: Ace Attorney – Spirit of Justice
- I Pagliacci, (The Clowns) – tragic opera by Ruggiero Leoncavallo prominently features Arlecchino as a character
- Jack – advertising icon for the fast food company, Jack in the Box
- Jack Point – from the Judge Dredd Megazine's The Simping Detective series
- Jojo – main character on the Disney Channel's Jojo's Circus
- The Joker – supervillain often called the "Clown Prince of Crime" created by DC Comics
- Kefka Palazzo – main antagonist of Final Fantasy VI
- Killer Klowns – from the horror films Killer Klowns from Outer Space
- Koko the Clown – from Max Fleischer's Out of the Inkwell series of animated cartoons.
- Krusty the Clown – television clown on the Fox animated television series The Simpsons
- Lawrence "Moe" Curls – minor character in Phoenix Wright: Ace Attorney – Justice for All
- Mr. Magic Pierrot – a villain of the week in the fourth season of the Sailor Moon anime series. Some clown-like monsters called "Pierrot" also appear in the Sailor Moon musicals and in the live-action series.
- Murder the Clown - from the Goosebumps Most Wanted book "A Nightmare on Clown Street", also appeared in the 2015 Goosebumps film.
- Pennywise the Dancing Clown (also known as "It") – shape-shifting monster in Stephen King's It and its adaptations
- Pierrot Bolneze – from Yakitate! Japan, clown, bread judge and master of ceremonies, he's also the crown prince of Monaco according to the series
- Rajoo – circus clown and the central character in Raj Kapoor's film Mera Naam Joker
- Rollo the Clown – played by William (Billy) Wayne, the "good-guy" clown in the Adventures of Superman episode titled "The Clown Who Cried".
- Rollo the Clown – from the 1991 film The Little Engine That Could, based on the children's book of the same name.
- Ronald McDonald – McDonald's fast-food restaurant chain's advertising clown character, first portrayed by Willard Scott.
- Sacarrolha - protagonist in a long-running Brazilian comic strip, created by Primaggio Mantovi.
- Shakes the Clown – title character of the film of the same name.
- Simeon Saint – primary antagonist in Ace Attorney Investigations 2: Prosecutor's Gambit
- Splinters – title character in a newspaper comic strip by William Steinigans, which ran between 1911 and 1912.
- Stan – clown name of the character Louison in the 1991 French film Delicatessen.
- Sweet Tooth – sociopathic serial killer who is a primary protagonist/antagonist in theTwisted Metal franchise.
- Tricky the clown from the Newgrounds series Madness Combat
- Violator – serial killer and one of the enemies from the Spawn franchise.
- Vulgar the Clown – protagonist of the 2000 motion picture Vulgar
- Wobble – roly-poly clown from the BBC children's TV show Playbus (later Playdays)
- Yorick – court jester who featured as the subject of a lengthy soliloquy in Shakespeare's Hamlet

== See also ==
- Evil clown
- List of jesters
