= Circus clown =

Clown performing or appearing in a circus

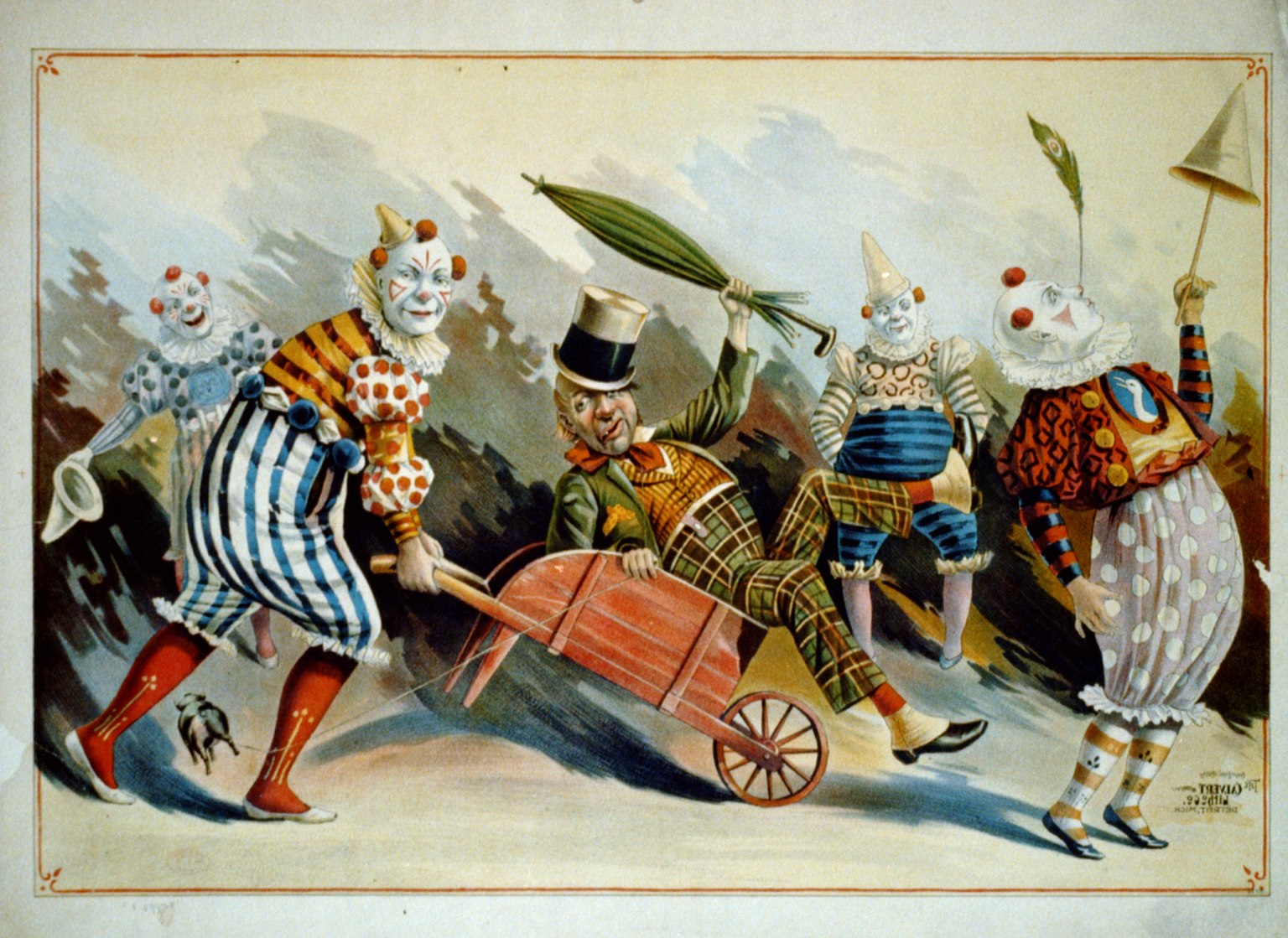
A portrait of clowns at a circus

Circus clowns are a sub-genre of clowns. They typically perform at circuses and are meant to amuse, entertain and make guests laugh.

== Traditional types ==
There are traditionally three basic types of clowns that appear in the circus: the whiteface, the auguste and the character. A fourth type, the tramp or hobo clown, is often recognized separately, though similar to the other three types.

Absolute definitions of what constitutes each clown type varies, with performers encompassing an extremely wide range of styles, from the classical to the innovative.

=== The Whiteface Clown ===
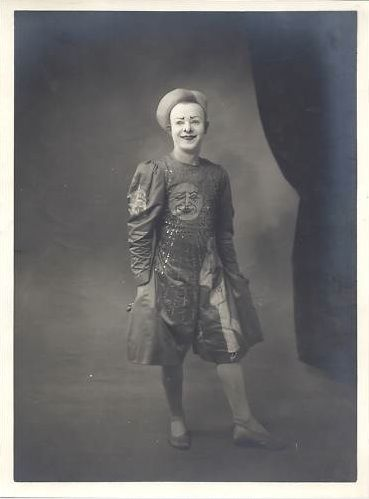
François Fratellini in whiteface makeup

The whiteface (or white clown) is the oldest of the clown archetypes. In modern times, when whitefaces perform with other clowns, they usually function as the leader of the group. Whiteface clowns use "clown white" makeup to cover their entire face and neck, with none of the underlying flesh colour showing. Features are then usually painted on in either red or black.

The whiteface clown is traditionally costumed more extravagantly than the other two clown types. They often wear the ruffled collar and pointed hat which typify the average person's idea of a "clown suit".

Notable examples of whiteface clowns in circus history include François Fratellini and Felix Adler.

Canio, the protagonist of Ruggiero Leoncavallo's famous tragic opera Pagliacci, is typically dressed as a whiteface clown. He is a classic trope of the "sad clown" (or jester) who laughs on the outside, but is secretly melancholic due to a grievance or a depressed state of mind.

=== The Auguste ===
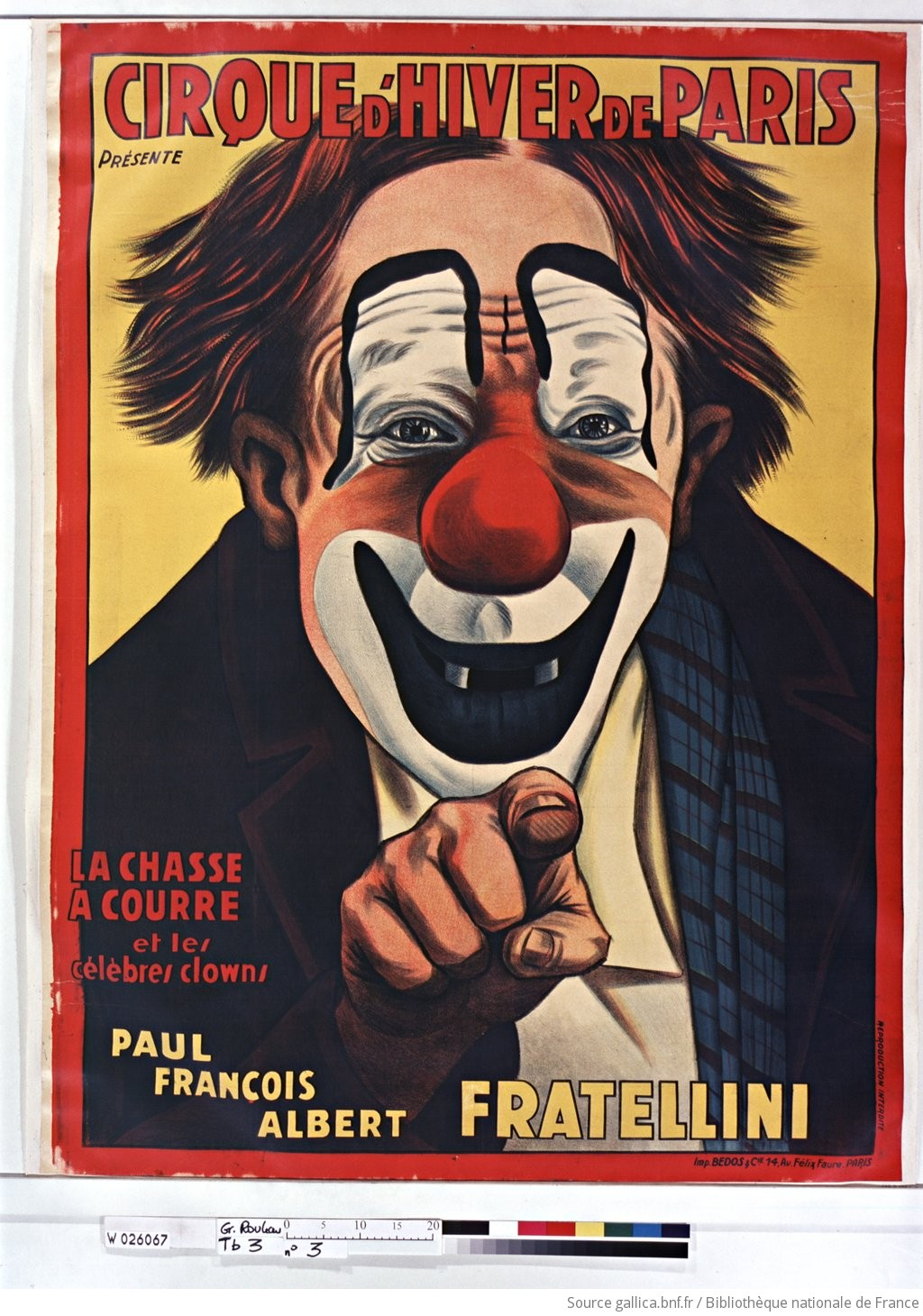
Poster for the Cirque d'Hiver in Paris with famous clown family the Fratellini's

Accompanying the white clown, there is often another clown variety known as an Auguste or red clown. In strict classical European circuses of the past, the augustes were never described as clowns because, technically, they were not instigators but recipients of the comic doings. The augustes are the ones who get the pies in the face, are squirted with water, are knocked down on their backside, sit accidentally in wet paint, or have their trousers ripped off.

The base color for the Auguste face makeup is some variation of red, pink, or flesh tone. The eyes and the mouth are encircled in white and the features are highlighted, traditionally in red and black. The Auguste is usually costumed in baggy plaids accented with colorful polka dots or loud stripes. They boast wide-collared shirts, long neckties, unruly colored wigs and oversized noses and shoes.

Notable examples of augustes in the circus history include Albert Fratellini, Lou Jacobs, Greg and Karen DeSanto, Coco the Clown, and Charlie Rivel.

=== The Character Clown ===
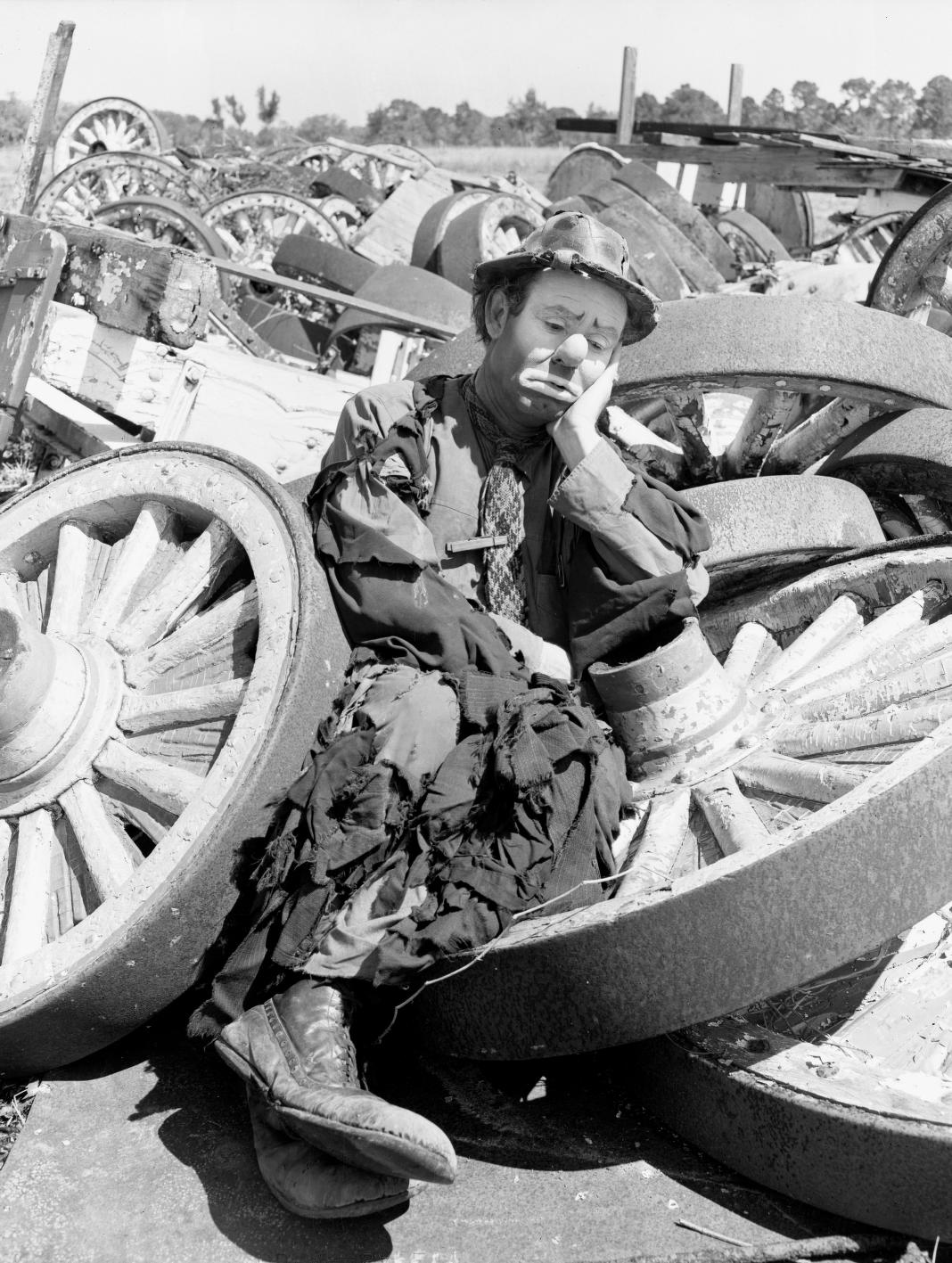
Emmett Kelly as his hobo-clown character, Weary Willie

The character clown adopts an eccentric character of some type, such as a butcher, a baker, a policeman, a housewife or hobo. Prime examples of this type of clown are the circus tramps Otto Griebling and Emmett Kelly. On film, Red Skelton, Harold Lloyd, Buster Keaton and Charlie Chaplin would all fit the definition of a character clown. (Note: Nowadays, the hobo or tramp clown is often considered a separate class and is treated as such in competitions at clown conventions.)

The character clown makeup is a comic slant on the standard human face. Their makeup starts with a flesh tone base and may make use of anything from glasses, mustaches and beards to freckles, warts, big ears or strange haircuts. The most prevalent character clown in the American circus is the tramp or hobo clown with a thick five-o'clock shadow and wearing shabby, crumpled garments.

When working in a traditional trio situation, the character clown will play "contre-auguste" (a second, less wild auguste), siding with either the white or red clown. Sometimes they are more cunning and less dim than the auguste.

Notable examples of character clowns in the circus include, Dev Chaube, Barry Lubin, Bill Irwin, David Shiner, Geoff Hoyle, Charlie Cairoli, Oleg Popov, and Bello Nock.

Examples of the contre-auguste character in non-circus trios include Larry Fine of the Three Stooges and Chico Marx of the Marx Brothers.

== Gags ==
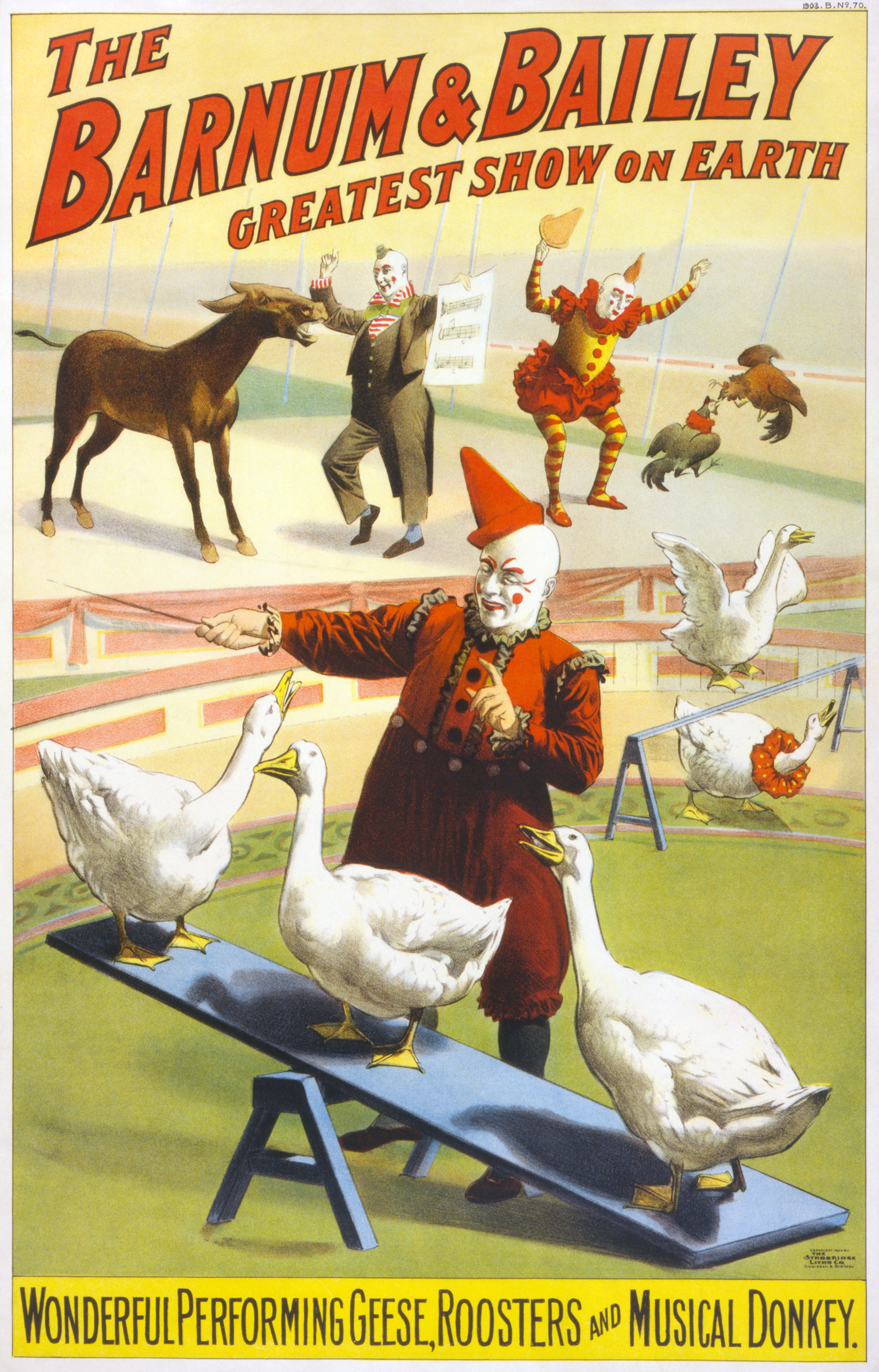
Circus advertisement depicting a clown act, 1900

The American circus term for a clown's act is "gag"; Europeans refer to it as an "entrée", and amateur clowns sometimes refer to it as a "skit" or "sketch". Gags are the clown's written and rehearsed performances. They can take place in the ring (a ring gag or production gag), on the track (a track gag or a walkaround) or in the seats. They can be done solo, with the ringmaster, with other clowns or with audience volunteers. They have a beginning, middle and end, finishing with a "blow-off". Gag may also refer to the specialized or gimmicked props clowns may use.

Gags can use many different types of blow-off (ending), but some of the most popular are the confetti bucket, the long shirt, a trousers drop or the time-honoured "all clowns exit running". Contemporary indoor shows may also end a clown gag with a simple blackout.

== Lingo ==
Basket animal
A costume made with a basket in the middle, looking as if the performer were riding a horse or other animal. Suspenders hold the costume around the performer's waist.
Blow off
The visual "punchline" of a clown gag or joke
Boss clown
The clown responsible for coordinating the clowns and the various gags in a show
Caring clown
Non-circus term used to refer to clowns who specialize in hospital visits
Carpet clown
A clown who works among the audience.
Charivari
A raucous acrobatic clown routine, typically done by a large group of clowns, consisting of a series of fast-paced acrobatic maneuvers and comedy jumps off of a mini trampoline, over a vaulting horse and into a mat
Circus Report
Name of a bi-weekly circus trade magazine
Chase
A quick run around the hippodrome track, usually with one clown chasing another
Clown alley
The clowns' dressing and prop area
Come in
The period an hour before showtime when the public is entering the arena before the circus begins. Elephant and camel rides are offered for a fee during come-in; butchers are selling their wares, and clowns are on the arena floor and in the seats. Some clowns specialized and only performed during come-in.
First of May
A term also used in the carnival, meaning a novice performer in his first season on a show. Shows used to leave winter quarters for their opening spot on the first of May, and there are always some new workers hired on the first of May who have never worked shows before
Hippodrome track
The oval area between the rings and audience
Joey
A mischievous whiteface clown (derived from Joseph Grimaldi, a famous pantomime clown in 18th-19th century England). Some sources say it only refers to an acrobatic clown, others say it is a non-circus term and was never used by professionals. The clown character used in Punch and Judy shows is traditionally called Joey.
Knockabout act
Comedy act involving physical humor and exaggerated mock violence
Producing clown
The clown who writes, directs and procures props and costumes for a gag
Production gag
A large-scale ring gag
Shows
The overall production that a clown is a part of, it may or may not include elements other than clowning, such as in a circus show. In a circus context, clown shows are typically made up of some combination of ring gags, track gags, walkarounds and chases.
"Stars and Stripes Forever"
The band reserved this Sousa march as a signal that an emergency had come up calling for the clowns to come running out from the Alley directing public attention away from the emergency or for the audience to be evacuated.
Suitcase gag
A visual pun that is carried inside of a suitcase and used during walkarounds. The set-up is written on the front and the suitcase is opened to reveal the punchline.
Trouper
A person who has spent at least one full season with the circus, and whose response to the demands of life and work on the road are those of a seasoned veteran. Also used in vaudeville (and in theatre in general) to mean a veteran performer.
Walkarounds
A clown feature in which they stroll the hippodrome track performing very brief visual gags that can be easily picked up, moved and performed again for another section of the audience

== Notable examples ==
=== Historical ===
==== Joseph Grimaldi ====
Joseph Grimaldi was one of the greatest English pantomime clowns. His father, Giuseppe Grimaldi (died 1788), was an Italian dancing master and pantomimist. Joseph's stage debut was at 3 years old in a dance at Sadler's Wells, London's famous variety theatre. Grimaldi never performed in a circus ring, but spent most of his life performing in full-length pantomimes.

He had the most to do with the development of the pantomime character of Clown. Grimaldi used a substantial amount of colour to his mouth, cheeks, and eyebrows over his painted white face. The most striking aspect of his make-up were large red triangles. His image was followed closely for the next 50 years by most British clowns.

Grimaldi was known as a master in the use of expressions of the body and face, unique sense of comic timing, imaginative byplay, and his overall comic abilities. He was famous and influential enough in his time to have had Charles Dickens write his biography.

Today clowns are often called Joeys in honour of Joseph Grimaldi. (See above in "Circus clown lingo".)

==== John Bill Ricketts ====
John Bill Ricketts, an Englishman who brought the first modern circus to the United States, began his theatrical career with Hughes Royal Circus in London in the 1780s coming over from England in 1792 to establish his first circus in Philadelphia.

He built a circus building in Philadelphia in the fall of 1792 in which he conducted a riding school. After training a group of Pennsylvania horses, he began on April 3, 1793, a series of exhibitions two and three times a week.

His advertisements referred to the equestrian exhibition as Ricketts Circus. Probably because of his interest in horses, George Washington attended several performances of Ricketts's circus. Performances included not only equestrian exhibitions, but clowns and music and later rope walkers were added.

==== Matthew Sully ====
Matthew Sully, a prominent English Harlequin, tumbler and singer at Sadler's Wells Theatre in London, joined Ricketts' company in the summer of 1795. He became particularly well known for his hit song, "Four and Twenty Periwigs." Later that fall, they were joined by the man recognized as the first "American-born" circus clown and professional dancer, John Durang. Much of what we know about Ricketts's enterprises we owe to Durang's detailed memoirs. The new clown was an accomplished actor and acrobat, and his variations on the classic comedy riding act "Tailor's Ride to Brentford" were extremely popular.

==== Jean Baptiste Casmiere Breschard ====
Jean Baptiste Casmiere Breschard, Circus of Pepin and Breschard, reintroduced the circus clown to America in 1807 after a number of years in which no circuses are documented as performing in the United States.

==== Joe Pentland ====
Joe Pentland was another popular early singing clown and one of the first to get top billing. He worked with Aron Turner's Circus, and then with Sands & Lent. He is one of those often credited with creating still another variation on the tailor's ride, called "The Drunken Sailor." Posing as a drunken sailor, Pentland emerged from the stands offering to ride an ornery horse, and was greeted with various hoots and cheers. After several hilariously unsuccessful attempts, he stripped down to his leotards and rode with consummate skill.

A later version of the act was wonderfully described by Mark Twain in Adventures of Huckleberry Finn, and other variations on it survive today in several contemporary equestrian routines, particularly those of the Hanneford family.

==== Tony Pastor ====
Tony Pastor, often called the "Father of Vaudeville", also began his career in the circus as a singing clown and acrobat before he opened his variety theatre in New York in 1881. Finally, circus pioneer Dan Castello, W. C. Coup's first partner, was not only a courageous owner and frontiersman, but also a renowned singing and riding clown.

==== Dan Rice ====
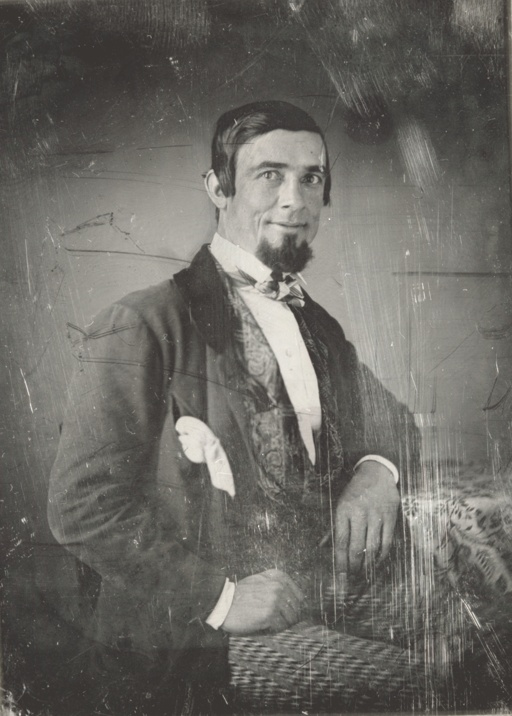
Daguerreotype Portrait of Dan Rice

However, the first American clown to achieve genuine star status was a jockey, gambler and strong man who used to catch cannonballs on the back of his neck. He was born as Daniel McClaren, but he is better known by his mother's maiden name of Rice.

Born in New York City, Dan Rice gained 19th century fame with many talents, most of which involved him clowning in circuses. In addition to his 'clowning' talents, he was an animal trainer, songwriter, commentator, political humorist, strong man, actor, director, producer, dancer, and politician. He ran for Senate, Congress, and President of the United States - dropping out of each race.

He changed the circus into what it is today by mixing animals, acrobats and clowns. His first break came in 1841 when he got a job of presenting a pig named Sybil who could do many tricks including the ability to tell time. From there he moved on to singing and dancing and got caught up in the popularity of the 'negro song', singing in blackface. He was said to sometimes go too far and make the song coarse. Gaining fame and popularity he changed styles once again he starred in various parodies of works by William Shakespeare, including that of "Dan Rice's Version of Othello" and "Dan Rice's Multifarious Account of Shakespeare's Hamlet" He would perform these with various songs and dialects showing just how versatile he was.

Expanding his horizons he went into producing his own shows and often had more than one tour going on at the same time. He wanted to move on from his circus clowning and reinvented himself as a gentleman. He started to take up politics and would often have Democratic undertones in his shows. He was then regarded as not only a multi-talented performer, but a smart and noble man who was to be looked up to. He won the affection of many newspapers and publicists including that of a then unknown Mark Twain and Walt Whitman. Mark Twain paid him homage in his description of a circus in Huckleberry Finn, and it is likely a boyhood Twain actually saw Rice perform when his circus came to Hannibal for a show.

His shows became more famous than any of the other shows touring at the time including that of rival, P. T. Barnum. During the 19th century, his name was synonymous with theater. At a time, Dan Rice was more of a household name than Abraham Lincoln. He reinvented the theater into a vaudevillian style before there was vaudeville. He was a very patriotic person later influencing the likes of George M. Cohan. He was also one of the main models for "Uncle Sam".

With changes in circus and popular culture after the Civil War, his legendary talents under the big top have gradually slipped into almost total historical obscurity; biographer David Carlyon (2001) called him "the most famous man you've never heard of".

While Dan Rice's talking and singing clown was taking America by storm, a new type of clown was emerging on the British pantomime stage, one that would have a more lasting influence on contemporary American circus clowning.

==== George L. Fox ====
George Lafayette Fox was America's first great whiteface clown. Known as the "American Grimaldi", Fox introduced Joseph Grimaldi's violent slapstick and topical satire to the American stage. He transformed it into a distinctly American style of humor reflecting the events of his day and influenced circus clown well into the 20th century.

In 1867, he created his masterpiece, Humpty Dumpty, giving over 1,000 performances on Broadway. His character in this production was a distinctive American anti-hero and helped Humpty Dumpty become the most popular pantomime productions of the time.

The slapstick form known as pantomime had been a Broadway staple since before the Civil War, but it reached a peak of popularity during the 1860s and 70's. These shows placed figures from Mother Goose stories in wildly varied settings, always finding an excuse to transform them into the clown characters of traditional commedia dell'arte (Harlequin, Columbina, etc.). Popular songs were loosely inserted whenever the audience needed a breather. Lavish sets and athletic clowning were expected, along with elaborate ballets. By far the most popular of these pantomimes was Fox's Humpty Dumpty.

The plot had young Humpty and his playmates turn into harlequinade characters and romp through a candy store, an enchanted garden and Manhattan's costly new City Hall. Fox's mute passivity set him apart from the raucous clamor surrounding him, and audiences took the little man to their hearts. Humpty Dumpty was revived several times. Fox eventually gave 1,128 performances in the title role, becoming the most highly paid actor of his time. He initiated the tradition of Wednesday matinee's to take advantage of the show's appeal to children.

He is considered by many to be the funniest man of his time. His white face character became an important part of popular American imagery, being used in advertisements and children's books long after his death. He is considered an influence on early film comedians including Laurel and Hardy, Charlie Chaplin, Buster Keaton, and the Marx Brothers.

He was removed from the stage during his last performance, and taken to an insane asylum where he died three years later, possibly as a result of poisoning from his lead-based white make-up.

==== Frank "Slivers" Oakley ====
Frank Oakley, also known as Slivers (1871–1916) was the most popular circus clown of his generation. Born in Sweden, both of Oakley's parents were concert singers. At the age of 14 he began to practice as a contortionist and at 16 he joined his first circus. His parents convinced him to enroll at the University of Michigan but two years later Oakley was back under the big top.

His first show was Andrew MacDonald's Circus, but in 1897 he joined the Ringling Bros. Circus. Before the turn of the century Oakley performed with the Barnum & Bailey Circus, followed by three seasons with the Adam Forepaugh & Sells Bros. Circus (1900–02). Oakley returned to the Barnum & Bailey Circus for four seasons (1903–07), where he reportedly earned up to $1,000 a week.

Slivers was famous for working solo in the ring. His featured gag was a one-man baseball game in which he played all the positions of both teams. Among his classic walkarounds was a gag in which he rode around the hippodrome track atop two giant lobsters.

He went on to perform in other circuses, in vaudeville and was featured (sometimes partnered with Marceline Orbes) in the massive shows at the New York Hippodrome.

He married vaudeville singer Nellie Dunbar in 1902 and they had one daughter, Ruth.

With the coming of motion pictures and the superstardom of Charlie Chaplin Slivers was supplanted as an American comedy icon. When other offers had dried up he tried to return to Ringling where he was offered only $75.00 a week to perform walkarounds.

He committed suicide, dying by gas asphyxiation, on March 8, 1916 in his room in New York City. Oakley had fallen for Viola Stoll, a young vaudeville actress, and remained infatuated even after she was arrested and incarcerated for stealing his late wife's jewelry. When he tried to have her paroled from Bedford Reformatory by proposing marriage, she rejected him.

=== Other famous American circus clowns ===
- George Carl - American clown who found great success in Europe. Performed "Royal Command Performance" for the Queen at the Palladium in London. He also received the coveted Golden Clown award from Princess Grace (Grace Kelly) at the International Circus Festival of Monte-Carlo.
- Otto Griebling - Prolific and influential Master Clown with the Cole Bros. and Ringling circuses
- Joe Jackson Sr & Jr. - famous tramp clown entree with a breakaway bicycle
- Lou Jacobs - an original founder and teacher in the Ringling Bros. and Barnum & Bailey Clown College
- Emmett Kelly, Sr. - performer who created the tramp clown character "Weary Willie". His son, Emmett Kelly Jr., performed a similar character.
- Glen "Frosty" Little - master clown and longtime "boss clown" with the Ringling Brothers and Barnum and Bailey Circus

=== Famous international circus clowns ===
- Lulu Adams - British clown
- Thomas Barry - British clown
- Charlie Cairoli - longtime performer with the Blackpool Tower Circus
- Coco the Clown (Nicolai Poliakoff) - longtime star clown of the Bertram Mills Circus, after making a name for himself in his native Soviet Union as a master clown
- Grock
- Yuri Nikulin - Russian clown and actor
- Oleg Popov - clown from the Soviet Union
- Remi - clown from Puerto Rico
- Charlie Rivel - Spanish Catalan circus clown
- Zig and Zag (Australian performers)

=== Contemporary American circus and circus-style clowns ===
- Barry Lubin - "Grandma", star clown of the Big Apple Circus
- Jeff "Gordoon" Gordon - "Le Clown Gordoon", star clown with the Big Apple Circus
- David Shiner - Tony Award-winning, American-born mime and circus clown and theater director who has appeared on Broadway and with several prominent circuses including Cirque du Soleil
- Benedikt Negro - Cirque du Soleil clown
- Steve "TJ Tatters" Smith - longtime director of Ringling Clown College, guest director with Big Apple Circus
- Greg and Karen DeSanto - husband and wife clown/comedy team
- John Gilkey - American clown and comic juggler who has appeared with the New Pickle Circus and Cirque du Soleil
- Eric Davis - American clown and comedian who has performed with Cirque du Soleil
- Michael Halvarson - Swedish clown and star pickpocket entertainer who has appeared in the Cirque du Soleil production Koozå

=== Famous former circus clowns ===
- Tod Browning - film director whose work includes several silent films with circus themes as well as the film Freaks
- Pinto Colvig - writer, animator and voice-over artist; the original Bozo the Clown
- Federico Fellini - one-time clown turned film director; used clowns and circus themes in many of his films
- Alejandro Jodorowsky - worked as both a circus clown and puppeteer before finding his calling as a cult filmmaker. Like Federico Fellini, he uses clowns and circus themes in some of his films.
- Emmett Kelly - actor who often appeared in classic "hobo clown" costume and make-up. Once, when called upon to be a villain in a film (The Fat Man, 1951), he refused to appear in his "Weary Willie" hobo persona, opting instead to portray a whiteface clown.
- Bassie and Adriaan - a Dutch clown and acrobat duo that travelled around with a circus and subsequently made a TV show based around the act.

== See also ==
- History of circus
