= Sergey Pavlov =

Sergey Pavlov or Sergei Pavlov may refer to:

- Sergey Alexandrovich Pavlov (born 1958), Russian actor, director
- Sergei Aleksandrovich Pavlov (born 1955), Russian football manager
- Sergei Nikolayevich Pavlov (born 1962), Russian football manager and former goalkeeper
- Sergei Pavlovich Pavlov (1929–1993), Soviet youth leader, politician and diplomat
- Sergey Pavlov (chess player) (born 1987), Ukrainian chess player
