= Salisbury International Arts Festival =

Salisbury International Arts Festival (founded in 1974) is an annual multi-arts festival that delivers over 150 arts events each year in and around the city of Salisbury, England. Events include concerts, comedy, poetry, dance, exhibitions, outdoor spectacles, and commissioned works.

The festival makes use of the surrounding landscape, hosting events in settings including the ancient circles of Stonehenge, Old Wardour Castle, the Wiltshire chalk downs, and Salisbury Cathedral. Every four years a new director is chosen to deliver the annual festival.

In 2018 the festival organisers amalgamated with Salisbury Playhouse and Salisbury Arts Centre to form Wiltshire Creative.

== 2016 ==
- Festival director: Toby Smith
- Festival dates: 27 May – 11 June 2016

This year there was a focus on Aotearoa New Zealand described as 'a distant land defined by Māori culture and its fusion with European and contemporary Pacific island traditions'. Featured artists included Trygve Wakenshaw, Corey Baker Dance, writers Witi Ihimaera and Fiona Farrell, theatre performances of Beards! Beards! Beards! (Show Pony), The Bookbinder (Trick of the Light) and The Pianist (Thomas Monckton). The music line up was the Modern Maori Quartet, New Zealand String Quartet, Benjamin Baker (violinist) and Jonathan Lemalu. Visual art was represented by Benjamin Work, The Glorious Children of Te Tumu and Caro Williams, Call and Response.

== 2015 ==
- Festival director: Toby Smith
- Festival dates: 22 May – 6 June 2015

In his second year as Festival Director, Toby Smith continued a four-year journey tracing the passage of the sun from night to day. Focusing on the glorious Eastern dawn, the arts and culture of the Middle East took centre stage this year. Some of the finest Middle-Eastern artists brought music, poetry, film and photography inspired by their rich cultural history, as well as the usual variety of brilliantly talented UK artists.

== 2014 ==
- Festival director: Toby Smith
- Festival dates: 23 May – 7 June 2014

The 2014 Ageas Salisbury International Arts Festival marked the start of a four-year journey that will go on to track the passage of the Sun across night and day, from an eastern sunrise to a western sunset. This was the year of the midnight sun, inspired by the theme of contrast in lightness and dark, in particular the fire and ice of Nordic lands.

== 2013 ==
- Festival director: Maria Bota
- Festival dates: 24 May – 8 June 2013

In 2013 Ageas Salisbury International Arts Festival celebrated the arts of Catalonia with powerful, feisty and witty work from the area around Barcelona.

== 2012 ==
- Festival director: Maria Bota
- Festival dates: 25 May – 9 June 2012

The themes for the 2012 festival were Brazil's rich cultural heritage, the Olympics and fire. Celebration was in the air as 2012 marked both the 40th anniversary of the festival and the Queen's Diamond Jubilee. Salisbury International Arts Festival staged the Fire Garden at Stonehenge in July 2012 as part of the Cultural Olympiad, attracting 10,000 visitors. Ageas became principal sponsor of the festival and its full name was amended to Ageas Salisbury International Arts Festival.

== 2011 ==
- Festival director: Maria Bota
- Festival dates: 20 May – 4 June 2011

The main themes for the 2011 festival were China, dance and physical form and air, with birds and kites flying high throughout the festival.

== 2010 ==
- Festival director: Maria Bota
- Festival dates: 21 May – 5 June 2010

The main themes for the 2010 festival were Russia, stories, stone and chalk. Inspired by the Wiltshire White Horses cut into the landscape, the theme of the horse also appeared throughout the programme.

== 2009 ==
- Festival director: Maria Bota
- Festival dates: 22 May – 6 June 2009

Salisbury International Arts Festival 2009 was named 'Tourism Event of the Year' at South West Tourism's 'Tourism Excellence Awards'. The first year of new festival director, Maria Bota, saw a series of themes—'India’, ‘spirit’ and ‘water’—woven throughout the programme. East met West in a programme of events from the festival's featured artist Kuljit Bhamra—composer, producer and virtuoso tabla player. 2009 also saw an expanded programme of outdoor events with activities scattered throughout the city, enabling audiences to stumble upon the festival in unexpected and unanticipated ways.

== 2008 ==
- Festival director: Jo Metcalf
- Festival dates: 23 May – 8 June 2008

== 2007 ==
- Festival director: Jo Metcalf

This festival focused on the themes of Latin America, movement and water. There were many acts from many countries in Central and South America including Mexico, Guatemala, Paraguay, Chile and Venezuela. Also, in this year, the festival formed a partnership with the Living River Project to bring water-themed events to Salisbury.

== 2006 ==
- Festival director: Jo Metcalf

The 2006 festival programme reflected the theme of 'Relate': how people connect with one another locally and as a global community. There was a strong artistic emphasis on storytelling, recurring motifs relating to the environment and atmosphere, and images of wings, clouds, birds, fairytales, myths, and dreams. These themes were exemplified in the Aboriginal Cultural Showcase, which featured a wide range of indigenous Australian artists, many of whom were visiting the UK for the first time.

== 2005 ==
- Festival director: Jo Metcalf

This was Jo Metcalf's first festival. Memorable events from the 2005 festival include the making of a sand mandala in the Cathedral Close and a performance by Tibetan monks at Stonehenge. There was also a strong literature programme this year.
