= Slackwire =

Acrobatic circus act

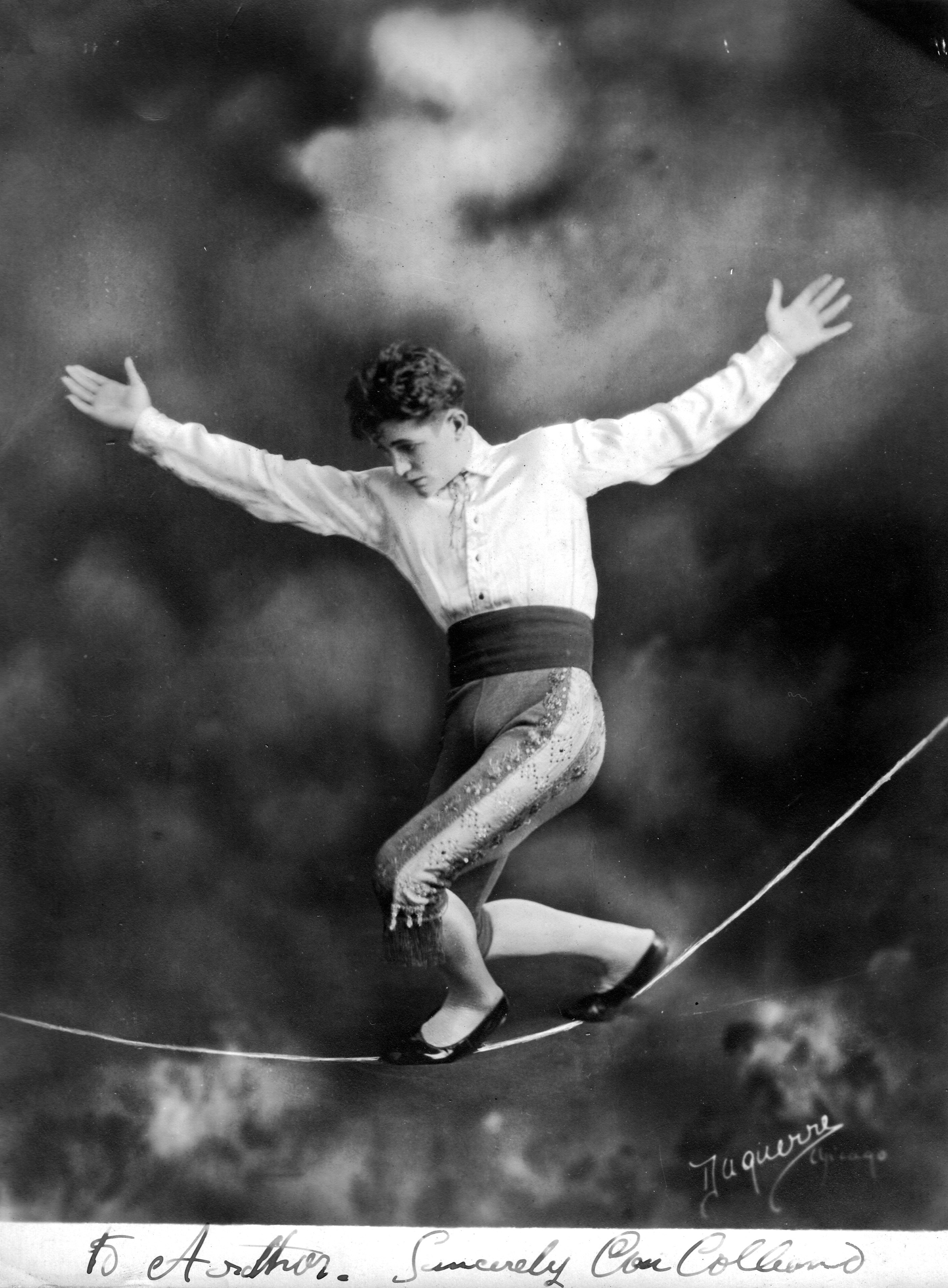
Con Colleano on a slackwire, circa 1920

Slackwire (or slack wire) is an acrobatic circus act that involves the balancing skills of moving along a flexible, thin wire suspended in the air, connected to two anchor points. Slackwire is not to be confused with slacklining.

== Description and setup ==
Usually slackwire utilizes a steel wire 4–8 mm (3/16–5/16 in) in diameter fixed between two anchor points. It can have two single stands with two extending wire pieces each to install the apparatus in an arena, or two A-frame stands with one extending wire piece for each. It can also be mounted between two trees at an appropriate distance apart, or fixed to a ceiling or any points which are strong enough to hold a performer's weight.

Wire walking artists usually use soft shoes made of leather.

=== Slack rope ===
A slack rope (or slackrope) is very similar to a slackwire. The difference between a slack rope and a slackwire is in the characteristics of rope and wire. A slack rope usually utilizes a rope 10–20 mm (3/8–13/16 in) in diameter. The slackwire and slack rope each have advantages and disadvantages for doing stunts. For example, it is easier and more comfortable to do "sliding" tricks on a wire than on a rope. On a slack rope a performer can walk without shoes, a feat that is painful on a slackwire. In addition, a slack rope can be used similarly to a cloud swing.

=== Technique of balance and angle of slackwire ===
The performer balances or moves on the wire while needing to control the wire beneath him from moving abruptly side to side, making continual adjustments. This skill is similar to balancing a stick on one’s head or on a finger. Each slackwire performer usually uses their own preferred angle of slack and length of the wire.

The slack angle is the V-shaped angle created when a performer stands in the middle of the walking part of the wire. The angle depends on how long or short the wire is relative to the distance between two anchor points. This also affects the amplitude of the wire's swing side to side. Some slackwire artists change the angle of the wire during their act.

The degree of ease or difficulty for a performer to move the wire is dependent upon how thick the wire or rope is. The heavier the wire or rope, the more inertia is required to move it laterally, and the more force is needed to control its movement or to bring it back to a place of rest.

=== Skills ===
A wide range of skills and stunts can be performed on the slack wire or slackrope.

Beyond standing and walking, artists can also do turns, lying down, knee stands, sliding, forward and backward rolls, splits, handstands, cartwheels, and headstands. Props such as a ladder, chair, unicycle, bicycle, and even a rola bola have been incorporated into some acts.

Some more advanced slackwire stunts are done while the wire is swinging, including standing, handstands, and walking. Slackwire balancing skills also can be combined with tricks as various kinds of juggling, balancing a stick on the performer’s head, playing a musical instrument, etc. Some of the same skills can be seen in cloud swing or trapeze acts as well.

==== Jumping rope on a slack wire ====
Jumping rope has been performed on the tightrope and slackline, but is difficult on a slackwire because the wire moves when the performer jumps up, and there is no way to control the swing and position of the wire when landing. This makes such stunts as somersaults and acrobatic tumbling virtually impossible. Jumping rope on a slackwire was first accomplished in 1985. The only person to accomplish the stunt is Sergey Pavlov. Sergey has been able to complete up to seven consecutive jumps.

== Similarities and differences ==
=== Slackwire vs. tightrope ===
Slackwire and tightrope appear to be very similar skills to walking and balancing on a thin wire or rope. In fact, the technique of balance is very different between them.

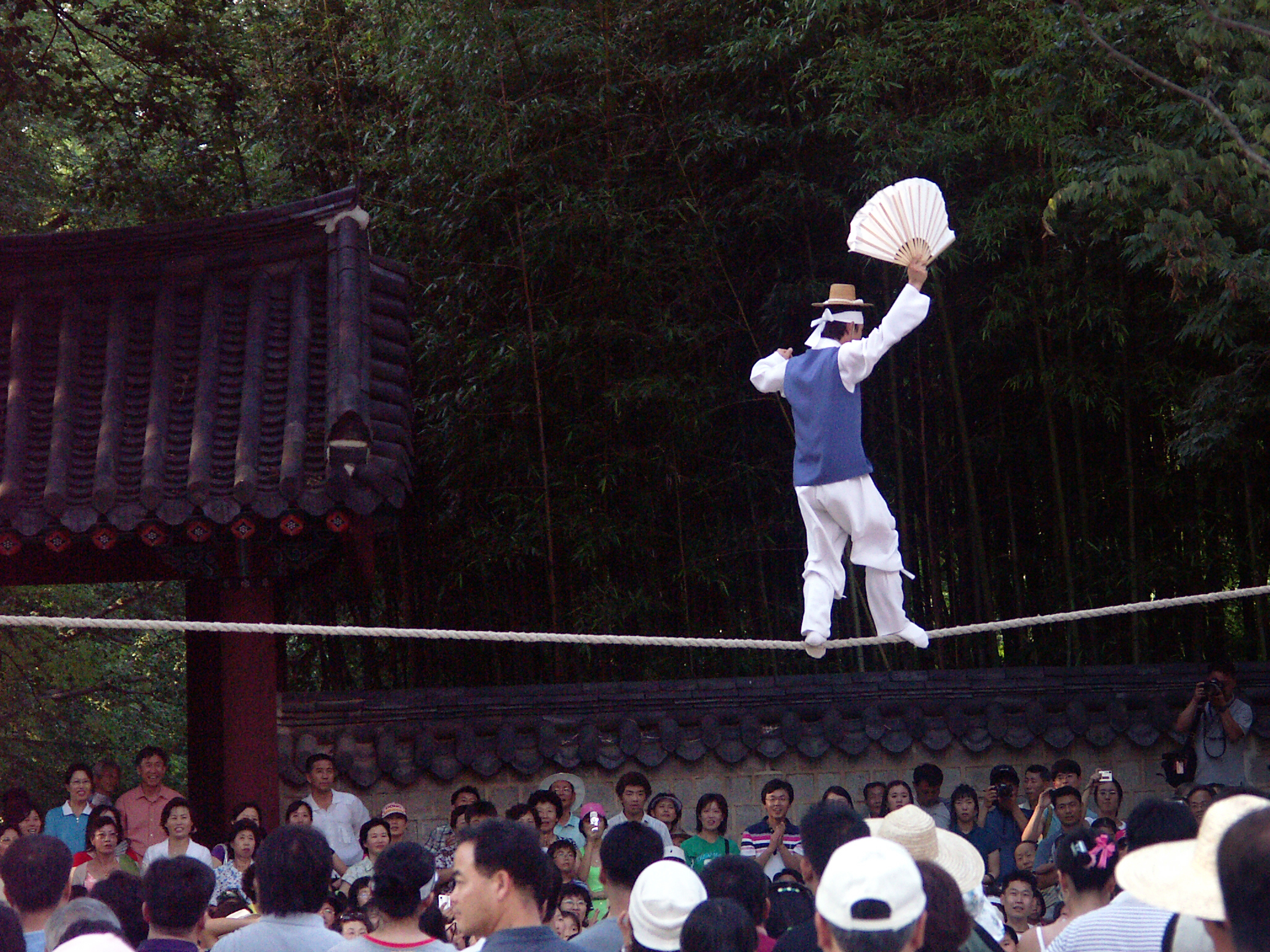
Tightrope performance (Korea)

Slackwire and tightwire/tightrope require different balancing techniques: tightrope performers keep their balance by shifting their weight over the rigid tight wire, while slackwire performers use a precise swinging motion to move the relaxed slackwire under their center of mass. Because of this, an artist who works on a tightrope cannot easily make a transition to the slackwire, and vice versa. They need to spend time to train themselves to balance in this different manner.

Some tightwire artists demonstrate a stunt called “the swings”, where the artist takes the position on the wire, then his assistant reduces the tension of the wire and the artist demonstrates swings. This stunt involves multiple skills to maintain balance. After the demonstration the assistant adjusts the wire back to its original tightness.

The same stunt can also be demonstrated on a slackline.

=== Slackwire vs. slackline ===
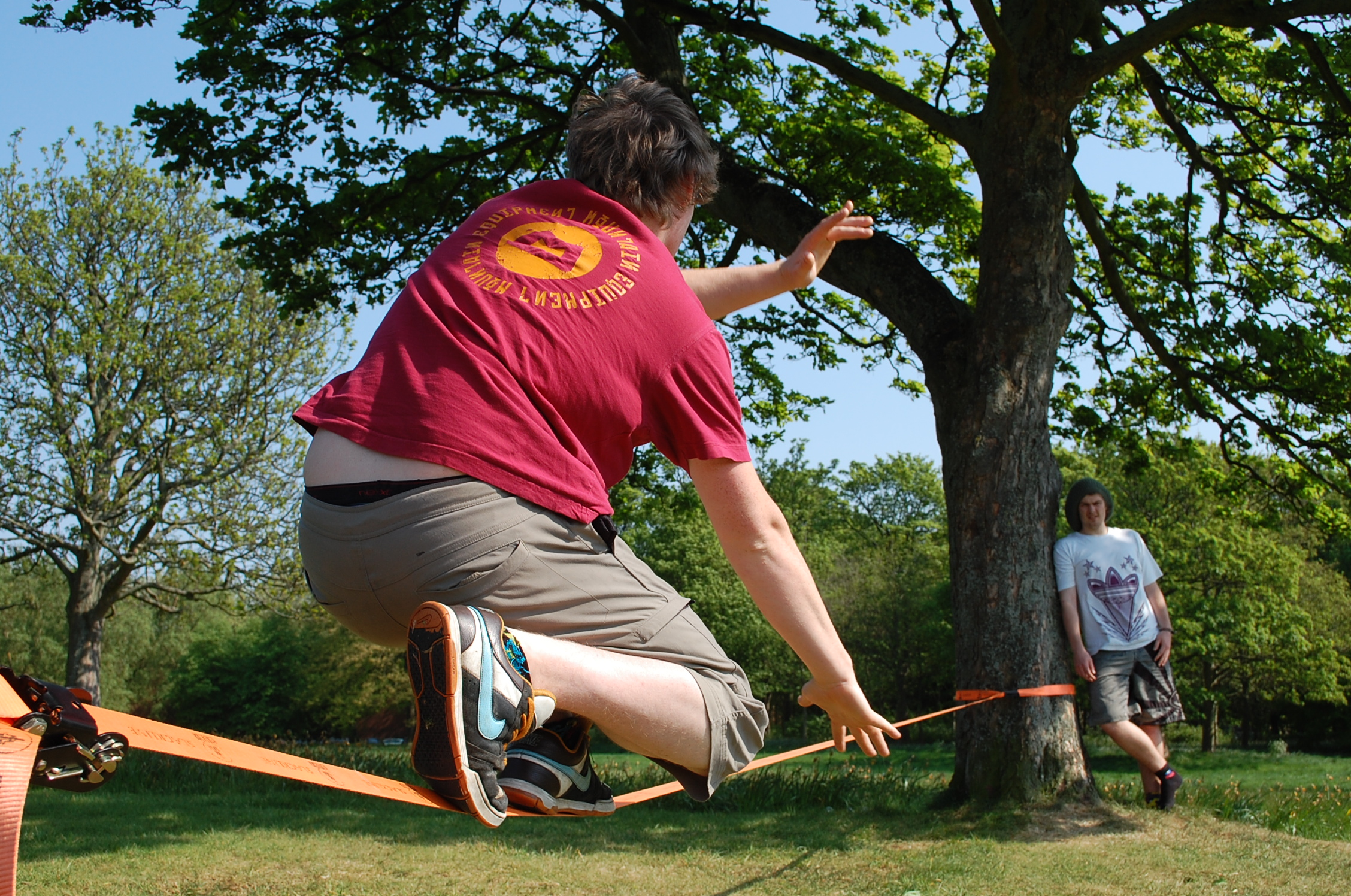
Slacklining in a park

Slackwire and slackline are not the same; they are different kinds of apparatuses that require different techniques of balancing.

- Slackwire utilizes a steel wire 4–8 mm (3/16–5/16 in) in diameter, while slackline utilizes a nylon webbing/strap approximately 20–51 mm (0.8–2 inches) in width.
- A slackwire has a loop and can be used like a swing; a slackline has no loop. The line is stretched tight between two anchor points like a tightrope and can only swing within a very small amplitude.
- A slackline can be used like a trampoline, allowing for an easy landing on the line after a jump. In contrast, a slackwire cannot be used like a trampoline, because when a performer jumps up from the loop of wire it will swing away with no way to anticipate its location upon landing.
