= Chuchin =

Surname and nickname

Chuchín is the name of José de Jesús Medrano (1948–1984), a Mexican clown. Chuchin or Chuchín may also refer to:

== Surname ==
- Feodor Chuchin (1883–1942), Soviet official, philatelic author and founder of Soviet philately
- Tossaporn Chuchin (born 1993), Thai footballer

== Nickname ==
- Antonio Soto Díaz (1949–2016), Puerto Rican politician nicknamed El Chuchín

== Other ==
- El Chuchín, nickname of Antonio Soto Díaz (1949–2016), Puerto Rican politician
