= Funny Bones =

1995 film by Peter Chelsom

- Theatrical release poster
- Directed by: Peter Chelsom
- Written by: Peter Chelsom; Peter Flannery
- Produced by: Peter Chelsom; Simon Fields
- Starring: Oliver Platt; Lee Evans; Richard Griffiths; Oliver Reed; George Carl; Leslie Caron; Jerry Lewis
- Cinematography: Eduardo Serra
- Edited by: Martin Walsh
- Music by: John Altman
- Production company: Hollywood Pictures
- Distributed by: Buena Vista Pictures Distribution
- Release dates: 24 March 1995 (United States); 29 September 1995 (United Kingdom)
- Running time: 128 minutes
- Countries: United Kingdom; United States
- Language: English
- Box office: $532,268 (US); 52,088 admissions (France)

Funny Bones is a 1995 comedy-drama film from Hollywood Pictures. It was written, directed and produced by Peter Chelsom, co-produced by Simon Fields, and co-written by Peter Flannery. The music score was by John Altman, and cinematography by Eduardo Serra. Funny Bones was released in the United States on 24 March 1995.

Set in Las Vegas and Blackpool, England, the film stars Oliver Platt, Jerry Lewis, Lee Evans, Leslie Caron, Richard Griffiths, Sadie Corre, Oliver Reed, George Carl, Freddie Davies and Ian McNeice.

== Plot ==
Tommy Fawkes is the son of British comedy legend George Fawkes. After his own Las Vegas comedy act flops with his beloved father in the audience, Tommy returns to Blackpool, the English seaside resort where he spent the summers of his childhood.

Disguised with a new identity, Tommy intends to seek out unique performers and purchase their acts. During this time, Tommy encounters his father's old comedy partners, Bruno and Thomas Parker. Once great performers, they now work as ghouls on a ghost train at Blackpool Pleasure Beach Circus.

Bruno's son Jack is a brilliant comic, but psychologically troubled. He has also been manipulated by a corrupt policeman known as Sharkey into stealing valuable wax eggs from smugglers. Tommy meets Jack's mother Katie, and even though Tommy is in disguise, she suspects that he is somehow connected to the family.

Tommy eventually realises that his father stole his original act from the Parker brothers. He then reveals himself to be Tommy Fawkes and Katie tells him that Jack is his half-brother. Tommy phones his father about the revelation and George gets on the next plane to Blackpool.

As part of their reconciliation, George arranges for the Parkers to top the bill at a Blackpool Tower Circus event. However, Jack is still hounded by Sharkey and cannot perform. During an elaborate Egyptian act, Katie gets rid of Sharkey via a sarcophagus, which is then kidnapped by the smugglers. The wax eggs (the Chinese inscription on egg is read "Eight Immortals") contained a mystical, ancient Chinese rejuvenating powder. Jack had previously placed the powder within a makeup tin, which Bruno and Thomas accidentally use, helping them to perform brilliantly.

Toward the end of the show, Jack is seen being chased by a policeman and climbing a giant flexible pole to escape. The pole rocks side to side and Jack spins around on the flexing pole, and smacks the climbing policeman in the face. The policeman begins to fall and is revealed to be Tommy.

In the last moments, Jack clasps Tommy's hand and saves him, both now wildly swinging around at the end of pole. The circus audience claps wildly with relief. Jack yells to Tommy, "I think they're beginning to like you." Jack laughs and Tommy, suddenly no longer afraid, waves at the audience spinning past and laughs joyfully.

== Cast ==
- Oliver Platt as Tommy Fawkes
- Lee Evans as Jack Parker
- Richard Griffiths as Jim Minty
- Oliver Reed as Dolly Hopkins
- Leslie Caron as Katie Parker
- Jerry Lewis as George Fawkes
- Ian McNeice as Stanley Sharkey
- Terence Rigby as Billy Mann
- William Hootkins as Al
- Ticky Holgado as Battiston
- Olivier Py as Barre
- Ruta Lee as Laura Fawkes
- Harold Nicholas as Hal Dalzell
- George Carl as Thomas Parker
- Freddie Davies as Bruno Parker
- Sadie Corré as Poodle Woman
- Christopher Greet as Lawrence Berger
- Peter Gunn as Nicky
- Peter Martin as Skipper

== Release ==
Funny Bones opened on 14 screens in the United States on 24 March 1995 grossing $26,946 in its opening weekend ranking 18th. It went on to gross $532,268. It opened on 15 screens in the United Kingdom on 29 September 1995 and grossed £35,293 in its opening weekend ranking 14th.

=== Home media ===
Funny Bones was released on DVD on 2 September 2003.

== Reception ==
In Empire, Andrew Collins gave the film 4/5 stars, writing: "Although Evans for many will be the film's selling point (and he turns in a delightfully demented performance, if a touch lax of Northern accent), it is the downbeat, timeless originality of Chelsom and Peter Flannery's story that marks it out for immortality. Not just a patronising pop at old-school vaudeville entertainers (although the freakshow audition scene is cruel fun), it is a beautifully written thesis on the in-built tragedy of laughter and the pain of nostalgia: 'Why do all the best things in life belong to the past?' A tower de force."

A.L. Kennedy wrote in The Observer: "Funny Bones is steadfast in its exploration of every possible type of funny: funny that's stupid, skilful, angry, delighted, intellectual, insane; funny that's subjective, personal, insightful; funny that plays with body parts and stares at death, defies it; funny that defies life – its losses, its wounds, its despair; stolen, denied, abandoned and rediscovered funny. It's all here."

Leonard Klady wrote in Variety: "Homage, memory and unabashed zaniness infect Funny Bones. It’s a tour de force for filmmaker Peter Chelsom, who chronicles a complex saga of vaudeville and shtick, pathos and absurdity. One can only quarrel with the density of the effort, which stuffs far too much story and sideshow into its modest frame. ... Funny Bones is an amusement park ride whose demands are often exhausting. But the experience culminates on a heady, spiritually satisfying note."

On Rotten Tomatoes, the film has an approval rating of 60%, based on 20 reviews.
