= Batatoon =

- Genre: Children; Game show Music; Talk show
- Presented by: Batatinha; Companhia
- Country of origin: Portugal
- Original language: Portuguese

Production
- Production location: Lisbon
- Production companies: Miragem (1998–2001); Hop (2001–2008)

Original release
- Network: TVI
- Release: November 30, 1998 – March 2008

Batatoon is a Portuguese television program aimed at children that aired on TVI in various forms from 1998 to 2007. The show was presented by António Branco Batatinha and Companhia until 2002, after which Companhia left and the program left weekday afternoons.

== History ==
Batatoon premiered on November 30, 1998, near that year's Christmas vacation period, as means to fill in a gap in the afternoon schedule. It was initially set to last for three months, but given the success it had in its early weeks, it became a permanent fixture of the schedule. By 1999, it was airing on weekdays at 4:30pm. The program started with Batatinha travelling to the studio using his miniature gray Porsche, in a format that combined cartoons with live studio segments, which had kids from a school in the audience. Recordings of the program were already booked up until February 2000.

During 1999, the program would end an hour later (at 7pm) during the Easter and summer holiday periods. The strategy worked, especially in April, where it surpassed RTP1's ratings.

For the second anniversary of the program, Batatinha said in an interview on Público that he was afraid that the program would cancel and that kids would migrate to Canal Panda. The program also imitated a moment from the first Portuguese series of Big Brother where Marco kicked another contestant. An extract of the gag aired on TVI's Jornal Nacional, which caused accusations that the program had anti-educational goals. This also coincided with Batatoon's 500th edition, which, instead of following the usual format, was a pre-recorded circus special at the Atlas Circus; both Batatinha and Companhia would also receive messages via the internet. Miragem, which produced the program, was dissolved in December 2001, and one of its two shareholders, Henrique Oliveira, founded HOP! and claimed Batatoon as his.

The program disappeared in its most recognizable form in mid-2002. There were several possible theories, one of them being the fact that the target audience for the program was reduced compared to older demographics. TVI continued carrying cartoons but only in the morning, ending its practice of airing them in the afternoon. In September, Media Capital sold its magazine to Zero a Oito and shifted it from a weekly publication to a monthly one. Later that year, a new version, Super Batatoon, appeared, airing on weekend mornings instead of weekday afternoons, and with Batatinha alone. This launch coincided with the new Batatoon CD. The new version still celebrated the fourth anniversary of the original program in late November, while still maintaining a leading position among children's programs, and announcing a new set for 2003.

Batatoon was revived on 23 July 2006, after an absence of nearly two years, and again, on weekend mornings. Most of the side characters from the original show returned, as well as the appearance of guest stars. The new format ended in March 2008.
