= James and Jamesy =

Canadian clown duo based in Vancouver

James and Jamesy are a Canadian clown duo, created by Aaron Malkin and Alastair Knowles with director David MacMurray Smith. Based in Vancouver, British Columbia, Canada, they produce theatrical and other clown performances, blending theatre, physical comedy and dance, which typically include significant audience participation, breaking of the 4th wall and improvisation on the part of the performers.

The duo also teach physical comedy, clowning and physical theatre classes and workshops in Vancouver and around the world.

Established in 2012, the duo has performed across the UK, USA and Canada, with notable highlights including sold out performances at the Edinburgh Festival Fringe in 2017, and a 5 week run Off Broadway at New York's SoHo Playhouse in 2018. As of 2020, their shows have sold over 60000 tickets and been performed more than 500 times globally.

== Origins ==
Aaron Malkin and Alastair Knowles met while working with a group of physical comedians and clowns in 2012 in Vancouver. Alastair's character (a.k.a. Jamesy), was improvised as part of the group work, and Malkin's character (James) was formed in reaction to, and to act as interlocutor for Jamesy.

The two describe their shows as ready to perform but also "incomplete" and "works in progress", since they rely heavily on improvisation, audience participation and interaction.

== Shows ==
=== O Christmas Tea: A British Comedy ===
Performed since at least 2016, the show mixes "Monty Python, Mr. Bean and Dr. Seuss". The show has since become a Christmas tradition, and the duo have toured and performed it on the west coast every December since (with the exception of 2020, due to COVID-19 restrictions).

As of 2021, the 23 city Christmas tour includes Vancouver, Seattle and Edmonton.

=== James & Jamesy in the Dark ===
Debuted in May 2014, the work starts with an unlit stage. Two strangers meet, each with a chair, and both attempting to place the chair on stage and then leave - and instead, they encounter each other and proceed from there. Trying to describe what goes on is "nearly impossible" - since the performance depends deeply on audience participation, improvisation, and courageous breaking through the fourth wall.

The show was inspired by an after dark performance the two were hired to perform in 2014 at a music festival.

The show has won numerous accolades and has been extremely well received by critics, with CBC reviewer Iris Yudai calling James and Jamesy "One of the most popular Fringe duos ever"

=== High Tea ===
Performed since at least 2015. The audience acts as a third character, Malkin describes the show as "having no fourth wall".

=== 2 for Tea ===
Performed in sold out performances at the Edinburgh Festival Fringe in 2017.

---

The duo also perform individually under the James and Jamesy banner, and have had significant success with solo shows and performances, including Malkin's performances in Thunderfoot (nominated for Best Comedy at the Just for Laughs festival) and Dandelion, and Knowles' performance in INK.

== Awards ==
- Canadian Comedy Awards - Live/Best Live Ensemble, 2016
- 22 time "Best of Fest" winners on the International Comedy Circuit as of 2021
- 3 times Impresario Award winners at the London Fringe Theatre Festival (Ontario)
