= Sergei Pavlov (footballer) =

Russian footballer and manager

Personal information
- Full name: Sergei Nikolayevich Pavlov
- Date of birth: 20 January 1962 (age 64)
- Place of birth: Saratov, Russian SFSR
- Height: 1.88 m (6 ft 2 in)
- Position: Goalkeeper

Team information
- Current team: FC Nizhny Novgorod (U-19 GK coach)

Senior career*
Years	Team	Apps	(Gls)
1979–1987	FC Sokol Saratov	172	(0)
1988–1989	FC Iskra Smolensk	50	(0)
1990	FC Kryvbas Kryvyi Rih	25	(0)
1991	FC Terek Grozny	40	(0)
1992–1994	Stahl Brandenburg		
1994–1995	FC Chernomorets Novorossiysk	42	(0)
1996	FC Sokol-PZhD Saratov	17	(0)
1997	FC Nosta Novotroitsk	39	(0)
1998	FC Salyut Saratov	18	(0)
1999–2001	FC Khopyor Balashov	64	(0)
2003	FC Kristall Smolensk	1	(0)

Managerial career
- 2002: FC Kristall Smolensk (caretaker)
- 2003: FC Kristall Smolensk
- 2004–2005: FC Tom Tomsk (assistant)
- 2006–2007: FC Sokol-Saratov
- 2010: FC Saturn-2 Moscow Oblast (director of sports)
- 2011: FC Olimpia Gelendzhik
- 2012: FC Zvezda Ryazan (assistant)
- 2018–2020: FC Tom Tomsk (GK coach)
- 2020: FC Smolensk
- 2021–: FC Nizhny Novgorod (U-19 GK coach)
- * Club domestic league appearances and goals

Sergei Nikolayevich Pavlov (Russian: Серге́й Николаевич Павлов; born 20 January 1962) is a Russian professional football coach and a former player. He is the goalkeepers' coach for the Under-19 squad of FC Nizhny Novgorod.
