= Lulu Adams =

British circus performer and pioneering female clown (1899–1982)

- Born: Louise Craston; 5 October 1899; Mechelen
- Died: 7 September 1982
- Other name: World's Only Female Clown
- Occupations: Clown, circus performer, clown, actor
- Employer: Ringling Bros. and Barnum & Bailey Circus
- Spouse: Albert Adams
- Parents: Joe Craston (father); Martha Cashmore (mother)
- Relatives: Victoria Craston

Lulu Adams (5 October 1899 - 7 September 1982), born Louise Craston, was a British circus performer. She was billed as the first female clown in the United Kingdom, and she was the first to perform in the Ringling Bros. and Barnum & Bailey Circus.

== Early life ==
Louise Craston was born into a circus family. Her grandmother and namesake, Louisa Manley, was the first tightrope walker to perform at the Brighton Hippodrome. Her mother, Martha Cashmore, was a tightrope walker also practiced equestrian vaulting and dog training. And Joe Craston, a famous clown and acrobat, was her father.

== Career ==
At age twelve she began performing musical acts alongside her sister Vicky. Their act combined comedy with the musical performance. She played the bagpipes as well as several other instruments while she danced and sang. She typically performed with her face greasepainted white, and wore a white wig under a white conical hat. She performed in a Scottish themed musical show called The Three Crastonians with her siblings Vicky and Joe, and also performed with her family as part of Hengler's Circus in Glasgow.

While travelling as part of The Three Crastonians, Lulu met her husband-to-be, Albert Victor Adams, in 1927. Albert worked as a clown and theatre manager. Lulu left her siblings (who renamed themselves The Crastonians) to focus on her duo act with her new husband, and the two were known as Albertino and Lulu. In 1939 they began touring the United States with the Ringling Brothers and Barnum & Bailey Circus.

When World War II broke out, Albert was recalled to the British Army Reserve. They returned to the United Kingdom and Lulu joined the British Red Cross as a nurse. As part of the Entertainments National Service Association, the couple entertained enlisted soldiers and evacuated children.

In 1948 they returned to the United States to again tour with Ringling Brothers and Barnum & Bailey Circus. When her husband died suddenly during a radio appearance on April 6, 1948, Lulu Adams was left to finish the tour alone.

== Post-career ==
She retired in 1962 after touring with circuses throughout England and the United States. After her retirement, she remained active, running a bed and breakfast in Brighton with her sister while also designing costumes and dolls. Her rag dolls were made from scrap fabric and trinkets, and popular enough to sell on commission.

Her papers and personal artifacts are held by the National Fairground and Circus Archive.
