= Russell Scott =

American clown

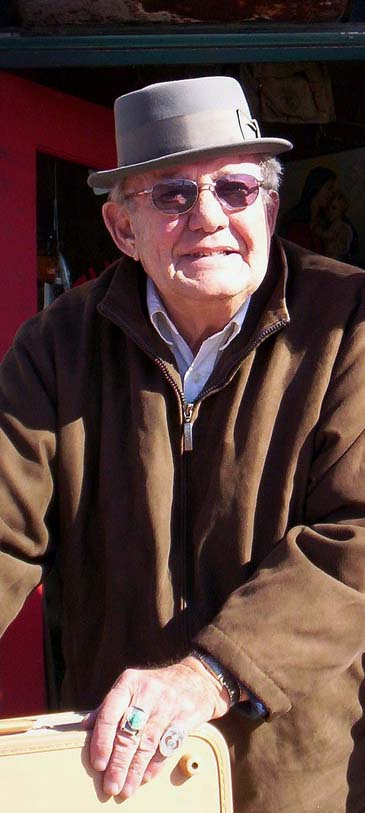
- Scott in 2005
- Born: June 30, 1921; Enid, Oklahoma, U.S.
- Died: August 27, 2012 (aged 91); Morrison, Colorado, U.S.
- Other name: Blinky the Clown
- Occupations: Entertainer, Television personality.
- Known for: Blinky's Fun Club
- Spouse: Gwenna Scott
- Children: 3

Russell Scott (June 30, 1921 – August 27, 2012), also known as Blinky the Clown, and simply Clown, was an American clown, television personality, and presenter who starred in a Denver, Colorado television program called Blinky's Fun Club. Having spent 41 years on television in character, Scott holds the record as the longest-running television clown in history, as well as the longest-running children's television host in the United States.

== Entertainment career ==
Born in Oklahoma, Russell Scott inherited his love of the circus from his father and began his entertainment career as Sears-O the Clown, performing in Colorado Springs, Colorado. Changing his character's name to Blinky, his success brought him to the attention of television station KKTV. Blinky's Fun Club began in 1958, originating from the KKTV studios. In 1966, the show moved to KWGN in Denver and remained there until ending its run in 1998. Scott performed in more than 10,000 episodes, giving him the longest career of any children's TV personality in the U.S. and the second longest in the entire world.

In 2004, he was inducted into The Silver Circle of the Heartland Chapter of the National Academy of Television Arts and Sciences. In 2005, he was inducted into the Broadcast Professionals of Colorado's Broadcast Pioneers Hall of Fame. In 2006, he was the subject of a documentary titled Blinky, produced and directed by Brian Malone.

After his television career ended, Scott owned and operated a store called Blinky's Antiques and Collectibles on South Broadway in Denver, Colorado. After 22 years, the shop closed in 2008.

Scott died on August 27, 2012, at the Bear Creek Nursing Center in Morrison, Colorado, from complications of pneumonia. He was 91 years old.
