= Gordoon =

Le Clown Gordoon is a New American Circus-style clown character created and portrayed by Jeff Gordon. He has performed most notably with the Big Apple Circus but has also appeared with Cirque du Soleil, Ringling Bros. and Barnum & Bailey Circus, and several other circuses as well as at the Walt Disney World Resort near Orlando, Florida.

Out of makeup, Jeff Gordon also appeared alongside fellow Ringling Brothers and Barnum & Bailey Clown College graduate Bill Irwin in the Broadway production of Largely New York.

A "Producing Clown", Gordoon is the creator of the "Toilet Paper Gag" (wherein the clown blows billowing rolls of toilet paper high up into the air with the use of a powerful leafblower) that has since been appropriated by legions of clowns all over the world.

== Bibliography ==
- Francis, Delma (2006). "It's a gang of clowns and more." Minneapolis Star Tribune. April 7.
- Schultz, Paul (2000). "Nose to Nose with a 'Fun' Clown." New York Daily News.
