= Charlie Rivel =

Spanish circus clown

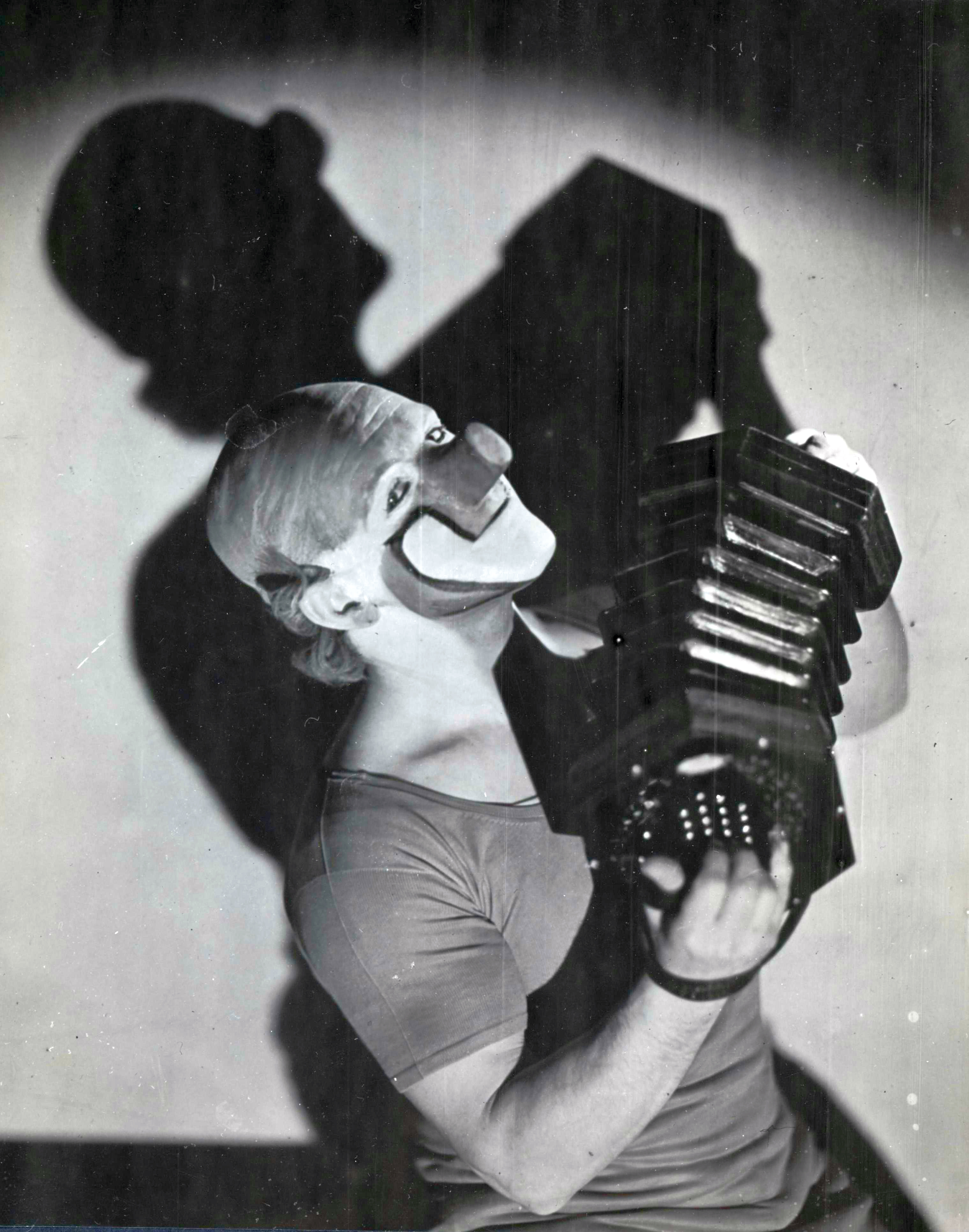
- Charlie Rivel (1943)
- Born: Josep Andreu i Lasserre; April 23, 1896; Cubelles (Barcelona), Spain
- Died: July 26, 1983 (aged 87); Sant Pere de Ribes (Barcelona), Spain
- Occupation: Circus clown

Josep Andreu i Lasserre (April 23, 1896 – July 26, 1983), best known as Charlie Rivel, was an internationally known Spanish circus clown. He was born in Cubelles (Barcelona), Spain. His parents Pere Andreu Pausas (Catalan) and Marie-Louise Lasarre (French), were circus artists as well.

== Career ==
He debuted at the age of three in a group of siblings known as "Los Pepitos". Later he formed the group Trío Rivels with his brothers Polo Rivel and René Rivel. He took his artistic first name from Charlie Chaplin whom he encountered first in 1910. Each respected the other. Legend has it that Chaplin later asked him: "Is it you who imitate me or I who imitate you?". He later discovered his definitive routine, featuring a chair, a guitar and a long jersey.

In 1970, he appeared in Federico Fellini's film The Clowns. He performed in the interval act for the Eurovision Song Contest 1973 in Luxembourg.

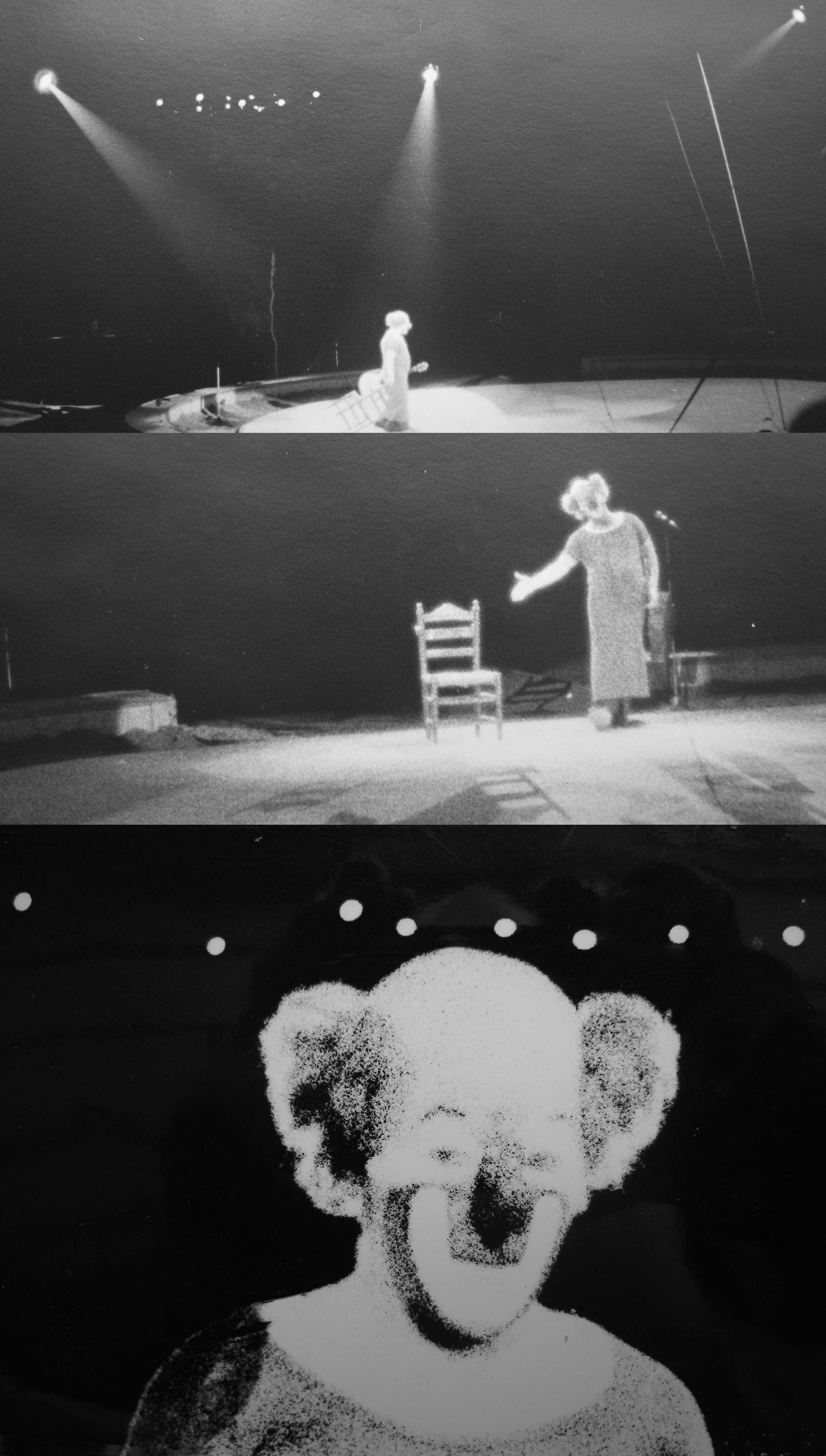
Charlie Rivel, in Vienna, Austria, in 1972.

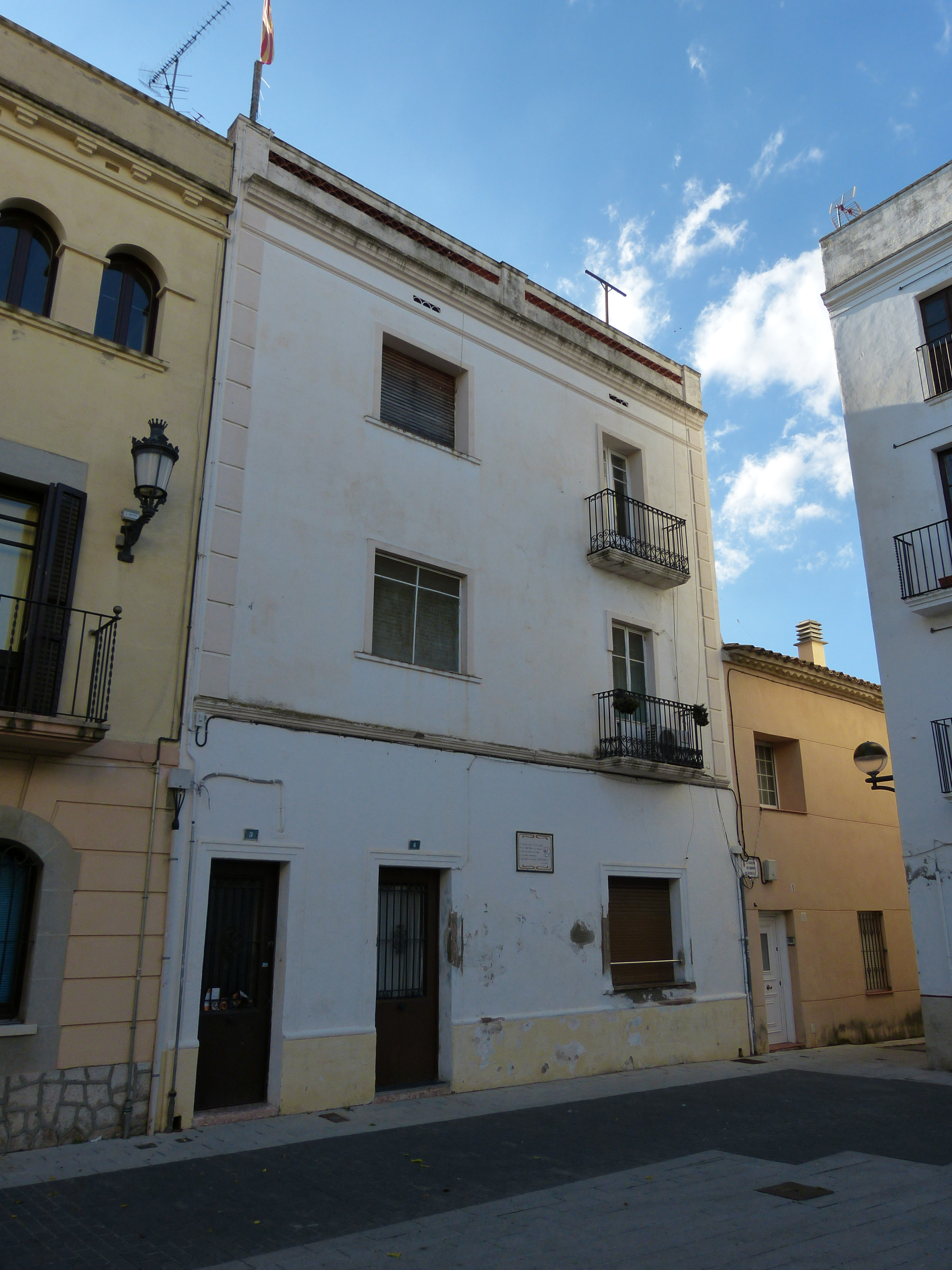
Charlie Rivel's birthplace house. Cubelles, (Barcelona), Spain.

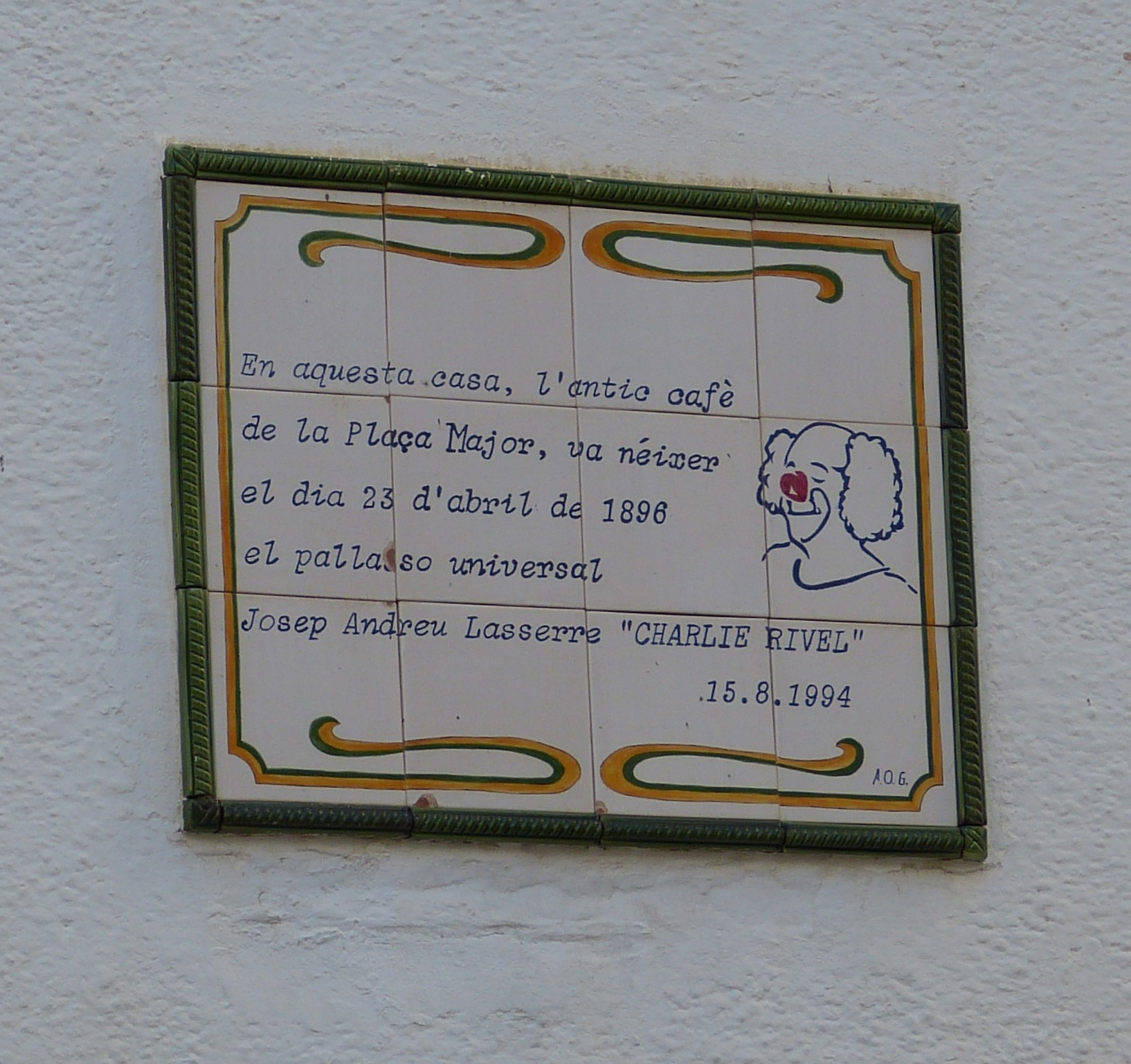
Plaque on Charlie Rivel's birthplace house.

== Representation in popular culture ==
The Charlie Rivel Hall in Cubelles is a museum dedicated to him. A statue designed by Joaquim Ros i Sabaté honors him in the Joan Brossa gardens in Barcelona. There is also a park dedicated to him in Vigo (Pontevedra).

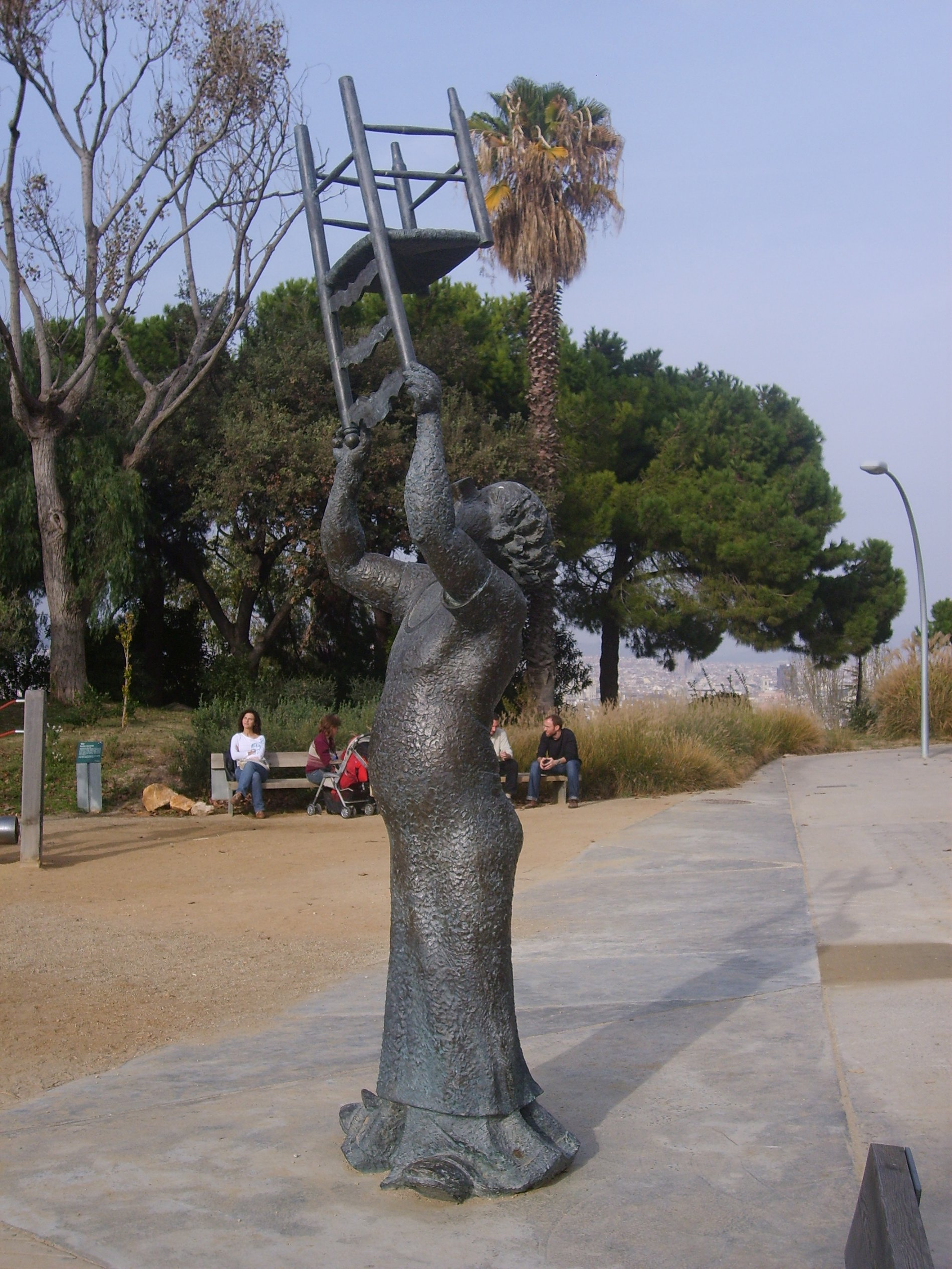
Monument to Charlie Rivel in the Joan Brossa gardens. Barcelona, Spain.
