= Benedikt Negro =

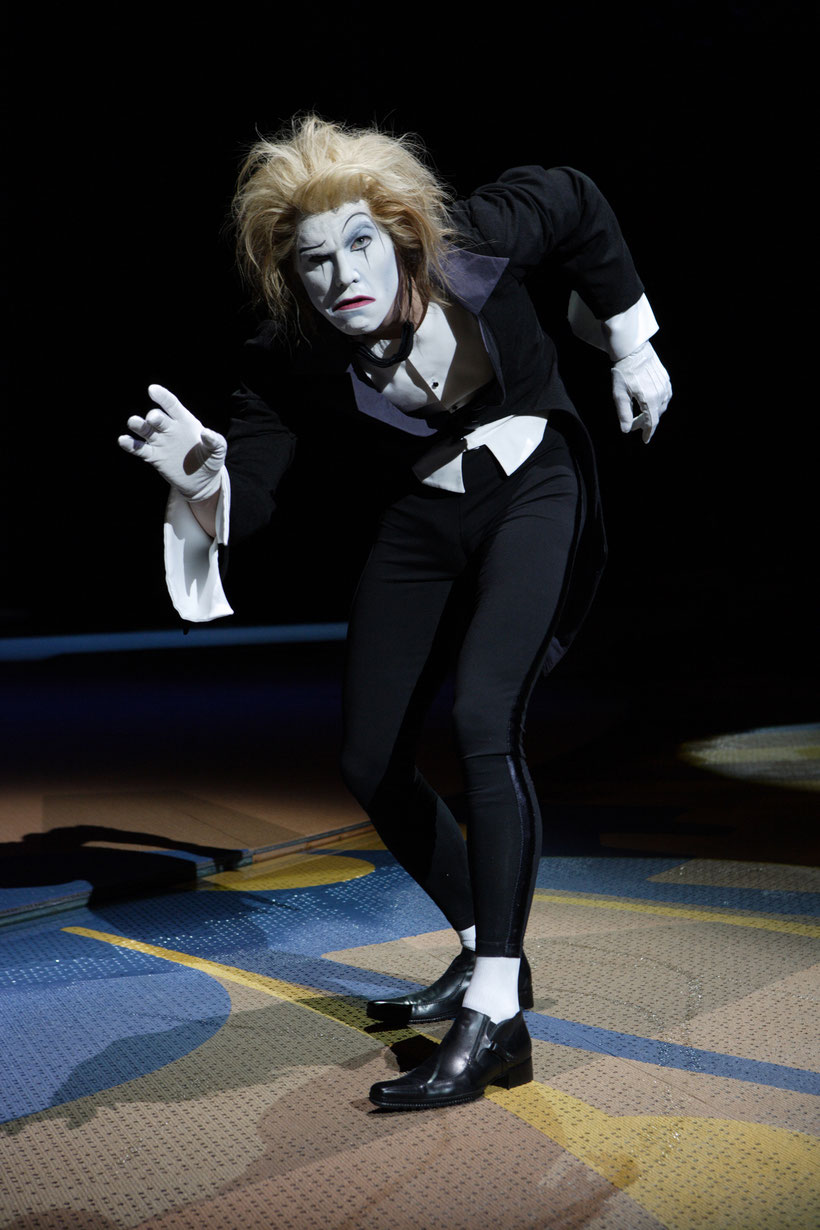
- Born: Benedikt Plümpe; Xanten, Germany
- Occupations: Mime, clown, actor

Benedikt Negro (né Plümpe) is a German pantomime, mime, clown, and actor best known for his lead performance in Cirque du Soleil's O and the film Cirque du Soleil: Worlds Away.

Benedikt joined the cast of O in 2003 and has played the role of Le Vieux (French for "the old man") continuously since then. He occasionally also performs as one of the two clown characters in the show.
