= Louison =

Louison is both a surname and a French masculine/feminine given name. Notable people with the name include:

- Shemel Louison (born 1990), Grenadian footballer
- Louison Bobet (1923–1983), French cyclist
- Louison Moreau (before 1668–after 1692), French opera singer
