= Blinky's Fun Club =

Children's television program

Blinky's Fun Club is a children's television program blending such elements as vaudeville, puppetry, and animation that first aired on CBS-Affiliated station KKTV in Colorado Springs, Colorado from 1958 to 1966 and then on KWGN-TV in Denver, Colorado, from 1966 to 1998. In 1998, William Ross, KWGN's general manager at the time, would cancel the series after a combined 40 year run (nine years on KKTV, and 32 years on KWGN) on Colorado television.

== Program synopsis ==
The star of Blinky's Fun Club was Blinky the Clown, played by Russell Scott. In the early 1980s additional characters began to appear regularly, including Otis and Zelda, played by husband and wife acting duo Michael Berg and C.J. Prince. Children appeared on each show to celebrate their birthdays and were sung "Happy Birthday to You" (sung as Birf-Day) by Blinky.

Over 10,000 episodes, taped at KWGN's studios, initially located at Lincoln and Speer in Denver, later in Greenwood Village, aired during the show's three decades on the air. The station reportedly saved tapes of only 10 shows. KCNC and KUSA reportedly were able to get a few of the episodes out of the trash, and put them in their libraries.
