= Alex the Jester =

Comedian

Alex O'Brien Feldman is an American born theatrical clown and comedian.

== Biography ==
Feldman performs under the stage name "Alex the Jester" in the style of a medieval court jester, a tradition which combines music, juggling, prop comedy and stage magic. While performing at the Just for Laughs international comedy festival in Montreal, Canada, Feldman began speaking a contemporary version of the medieval gibberish language Grammelot as part of his act.

In November 2009, Feldman was selected by the US State Department to entertain in Russia as a cultural ambassador. He has also toured the United States, Canada, Australia, New Zealand, Singapore, Belgium, Bermuda, Japan, China, and Mexico. Feldman currently lives in Somerville, Massachusetts and is married with two children, Desi, and AJ.

== Training ==
Feldman studied performance at the Dell'Arte International School of Physical Theater in California.

== Performance philosophy ==
Feldman wrote: "Audiences care less about what you do. They care more about who you are." Feldman's use of physical comedy to develop his character has been slowly built through a trial and error process.
