= George Carl =

American entertainer (1916–2000)

- Born: George Carl; May 7, 1916; Ohio, U.S.
- Died: January 1, 2000 (aged 83); Las Vegas, U.S.

Comedy career
- Years active: 1934–2000
- Medium: Vaudeville, television, film
- Genres: Clown, Eccentric dancer

George Carl (7 May 1916 – 1 January 2000) was a vaudevillian style comic, clown and eccentric dancer. Carl was born in Ohio, and he started his comedy career traveling with a variety of circuses during his teenage years. In time, Carl became internationally famous as a clown and visual comedian. Johnny Carson, a fan of Carl's, invited him to appear on The Tonight Show on March 21, 1985, when Carl was 69. His appearance was so well received that he was asked back within weeks for a second appearance which also received raves from viewers. He appeared again on May 27, 1986, doing essentially his same act and received great laughter from an obviously appreciative audience.

With hardly any props, except for a microphone, a mic stand, his hat, and sometimes a harmonica, Carl would seemingly accidentally become tangled up in the mic cord, get his thumb stuck in the microphone stand and, through a flurry of silent bits, wind up accomplishing nothing at all in the time spent onstage.

At the age of 79, Carl made his screen debut in the 1995 film Funny Bones starring Jerry Lewis. He played an old music-hall comedian, one of the Parker brothers, who never spoke until a scene in which his character explains the reason performers perform: "Our suffering is special. The pain we feel is worse than anyone else. But the sunrise we see is more beautiful than anyone else. The Parkers is ... like the moon. There's one side forever dark. Invisible. As it should be. But remember, the dark moon draws the tides also."

Comedians using similar visual material include Charlie Frye, Bill Irwin, Geoff Hoyle, Barry Lubin, Chipper Lowell, Peter Shub, Rob Torres, Dandy Danno and Avner the Eccentric.

Carl died of cancer in Las Vegas on January 1, 2000.
