= Chuchín =

Mexican clown

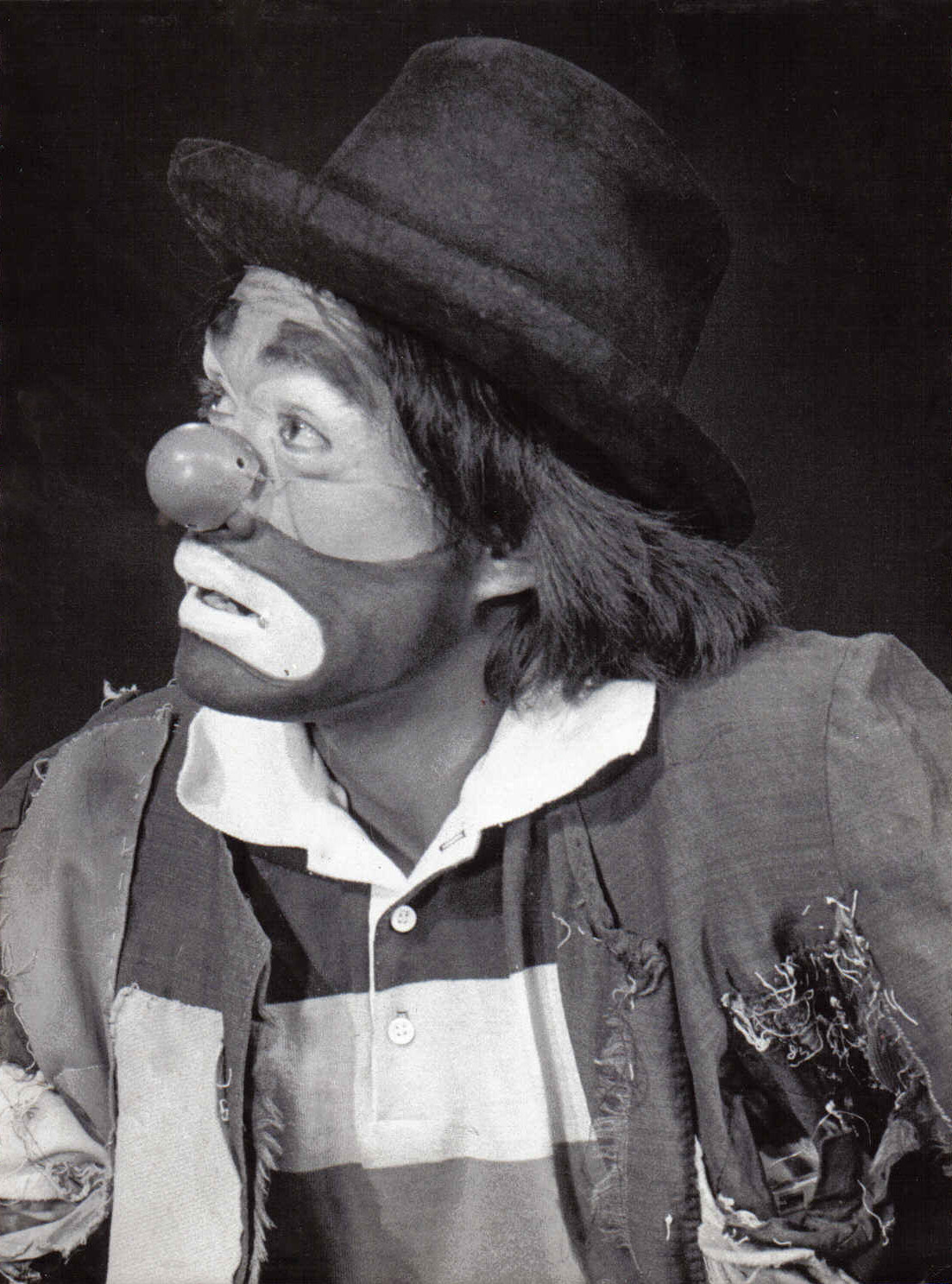
Chuchin The Clown looking sad

José de Jesus Medrano Murillo (February 19, 1948 – May 29, 1984), better known as Chuchín, was a Mexican clown and star attraction of many circuses in Mexico from the late 1960s to 1984, when he died while on tour in Africa. He toured Peru as the Circo Bell's Main attraction. Chuchin appeared in the 1983 Mexican film Esta y L'otra con un solo boleto. While performing at the Royal Show, Chuchin fell to his death on May 29, 1984, in South Africa. Ironically, his fall occurred not during his high-wire bicycle act, but rather as he was descending from the platform after completing the act.

In 1982, Chuchin toured with Circo Atayde as the most famous acrobatic and singing circus clown in Mexico. At the time, circus Atayde had resolved never to present any performer as the star of their show, because the star of their show was the name Atayde. Chuchin was recognized by the Mexican press while on his presentation at The Arena Mexico in Mexico City. From then on, Chuchin was the first person or performer name other than Atayde's name to be presented as the star of their show.

Jose de Jesus Medrano's son Mizrraim Jesus Medrano currently performs under the name Chuchin in honor of his father. Witness.co.za (1) ess.co.za (2)
