= Batatinha =

Portuguese clown

António Branco (born 1957), is a famous Portuguese clown who performs as Batatinha (meaning "small potato"). In the early years of his career, Batatinha worked with another famous Portuguese clown named Palhaço Croquete. Since their separation, he has worked with Companhia.

Batatinha had a show with Companhia on Portuguese national television (RTP) called Vamos ao Circo. Shortly after they had a daily show called Batatoon on the Portuguese television station TVI that lasted from 1998 until 2002, when Batatinha and his colleague Companhia had a public spat live on TV (though they refuse to admit that physical aggressions were exchanged). In 2003, Batatinha and Companhia parted ways and since then Batatinha has performed solo.

In January 2011, the pair was reunited on TV and solved their differences and united once again as the popular clown duo. In 2011, Batatinha participated on the RTP television show Último a Sair, a spoof of reality-TV shows in character as the clown.
