= Peter Shub =

Peter Shub (born May 12, 1957, in Philadelphia, Pennsylvania, U.S.) is an American actor, clown and vaudeville show director who moved to Europe in the 1980s. He has worked with a number of distinguished international organizations and artists and went on tour with well known circuses such as the German Circus Roncalli, the Big Apple from New York and the Canadian Cirque du Soleil. He has won a Silver Clown of Monte Carlo award (International Circus Festival of Monte-Carlo) and went on tour with his own show (German: „Fuer Garderobe keine Haftung“) as well as with other vaudeville shows throughout Europe. He has been called a "legend", a "modern master", and a "fixture of the German Varieté world."

== Life ==
Peter Shub was born in 1957 in Philadelphia, Pennsylvania. He spent his childhood in New York City and later studied sociology at Temple University in Philadelphia. It was here that he met a street artist, a magician, whose work fascinated Shub to such an extent that he moved to Europe after receiving his degree.

He studied at the drama schools Ecole de Etienne Decroux (1980–83) and Ecole Phillipe Gaulier (1982-84) in Paris and soon discovered a talent for making people laugh and became a clown instead.

During his career he has worked in a variety of circuses. He gives workshops all over the world, mostly in Europe, and has also appeared in a number of shows.

== Projects ==
- Tour of his show Nice-Night-For-An-Evening in Germany, Austria and Switzerland
- Tour of his show Fuer Garderobe keine Haftung

== Awards ==
- Silver clown of Monte Carlo (International Circus Festival of Monte-Carlo) (1993)
- Silver clown in Paris (Cirque de Demain Festival) (1985)
- Jury Award in Cannes (International Theater Festival)
- First place Virginia Mime Festival (1983)
- Swiss Club Comedy Award
