= John Gilkey =

- Born: California, United States
- Occupations: Actor, comedian, clown, juggler
- Website: johngilkey.com

John Gilkey is an American actor, director, comedian, juggler and clown.

Gilkey is a native Californian and best known for his work with Cirque du Soleil productions such as Iris, Quidam, Dralion and Solstrom. He was also cast in Varekai in 2003 as one of the main clowns.

Gilkey also worked as a consultant on the animated films Ratatouille and La Luna.

In 2012, John Gilkey established The Idiot Workshop in Hollywood, California. From these classes Gilkey selected a handful of students and formed a new comedy troupe called Wet the Hippo. The group went on to tour California and Las Vegas and received a nomination for Best Comedy in the 2013 Hollywood Fringe Festival.
