= Michael Halvarson =

Swedish comedian, illusionist and stage magician

- Born: July 30, 1976 (age 49); Stockholm, Sweden
- Occupations: Comedian, illusionist, stage magician
- Website: michaelhalvarson.com

Michael Halvarson (born 30 July 1976 in Stockholm) is a Swedish comedian, illusionist and stage magician. His performances combine comedy, magic and stage pickpocketing. He performed in Cirque du Soleil’s touring production Koozå and has appeared on Swedish television in SVT’s Helt magiskt (2011). In 2012 he guested BBC One’s series The Magicians and appeared as “The Trickster” in The Illusionists in Singapore.

== Career ==
Halvarson made his professional stage debut at age 17 at Wallman's Golden Hits in Stockholm. He later performed in comedy clubs, variety shows and on radio and television across the Nordic region. His international profile rose with Koozå; reviews noted his pickpocket/clown routines by name.

In 2011, Halvarson was one of the featured magicians—alongside Joe Labero and Charlie Caper—in SVT's Saturday-night series Helt magiskt. The programme attracted broad press coverage; one segment featuring a guillotine illusion drew discussion in Swedish media.

In 2012 he guested BBC One's The Magicians (series 2). The same year he appeared in The Illusionists during its Singapore run at Marina Bay Sands, billed as “The Trickster”.

=== Later career ===
In the years following his television appearances and work with The Illusionists, Halvarson continued to perform internationally.

In 2015, he was announced as the main act for the New Year gala at the Hôtel de Paris in Monte Carlo.

In 2018, Swedish Radio reported that he would again perform with Cirque du Soleil in Monte Carlo.

In 2024, he appeared in Big Apple Circus's Hometown Playground at Lincoln Center in New York, where Broadway.com described him as "the comedy pickpocket".

== Style ==
Critics have described Halvarson's stage persona as a deft pickpocket/clown figure integrated between larger set-pieces in Koozå.
