= Thomas Monckton =

New Zealand entertainer

Thomas "Thom" Monckton is an entertainer from Patea, South Taranaki, New Zealand. Monckton trained for two years at New Zealand's circus school CircoArts and two years at the physical theatre school Lecoq in Paris. He has worked around New Zealand as a solo artist and as an actor with the Ugly Shakespeare Theatre Company. He is now based in Europe. Monckton's solo silent work of circus and clown, The Pianist, has been performed in Finland, Scotland, England, New York and various cities in New Zealand. It won the 2014 Total Theatre Award for Best Circus Show at the Edinburgh Fringe Festival. His previous show, Moving Stationery, was the big sell-out hit of the 2012 Wellington Fringe, sweeping the awards and going on to win Monckton a Best Actor gong at that year's Chapman Tripp Theatre Awards. His production Only Bones, has been performed in Finland, Belgium, England, New Zealand, France, China, Czech Republic, and in Mexico. An acclaimed piece of physical theatre, Only Bones v1.0 the Best in Physical Theatre NZ Fringe 2015 and Best in Fringe at both New Zealand and Auckland Fringe Festivals in 2019. In Autumn 2017, Monckton premiered physical comedy The Artist, which has toured Europe, Australia, and New Zealand. Its final season will be at Sydney Festival in January 2023.

In March 2022, Monckton demoed a new work The King of Taking at BATS Theatre. The comedy has since toured to Dunedin, Nelson, and Auckland in New Zealand. It is headed to Adelaide Fringe in 2023.
