= Sergey Alexandrovich Pavlov =

Russian actor and clown

- Born: Sergey Alexandrovich Pavlov; Russia
- Occupations: actor, television director
- Years active: 1976–present

Sergey A. Pavlov (Russian: Серге́й Александрович Павлов) (born 1958, USSR) is a Russian actor, clown, television director, writer and composer

== Biography ==
1980 – Sergey Pavlov was a student of "Clown Studio" in Moscow Circus on Tsvetnoy Boulevard

1980–1984 learning in "National State College of Circus & Variety Arts" (Clown department)

1984–1987 working in "Moscow Stage Circus"

1987–2004 "Mosconcert" (Moscow Concert Company) with act "Music clown”

1994 TV Director Courses – He graduated from the "Moscow Institute Advanced Studies of Television & Radio" (Russian: Московский Институт Повышения Квалификации Работников Телевидения и Радиовещания)

== The Clown Character LALALA and Show ==
On 1984 Sergey Pavlov has created a clown character LALALA (idea, designing ... by S. Pavlov) Also he is an author, director of his clown/eccentric acts: “The Tangle”, “Little Violin”, “Conductor”, Dance “LALALA” (tap dancing), The Song "Quack-Quack", "Eccentric Slack Wire"...

Later S. Pavlov created his LALALA SHOW. This is a physical comedy one-man show where he uses universal skills.

=== LALALA SHOW performed ===
- 1989 – Just for laughs – (International Festival) Montreal / Canada
- 1989 – OLYMPIC CULTURAL OF BARCELONA ' 92 (International Festival) Spain
- 1994 – THE 6th SPRING OF PUMPKINS (International Festival) Toulouse / France
- 1994 – VI FESTIVAL INTERNATIONAL DE PALLASSOS * Cornella / Spain
- 1994 – UN MUNT DE PALLASSOS (International Festival) Castello – Benicassim – Vinaros / Spain
- 1999 – 6a MOSTRA INTERNACIONAL DE TEATRE DE PALLASSOS DE XIRIVELLA – Spain
- 2008 – HELEN STAIRS THEATRE (Florida) U.S.A.

=== Tours ===
- 1989–1990 "SOVIET ACROBATIC REVUE" Big Tour – U.S.A./ Canada
- 1991 – LES CLOWNS DU CIRQUE DU MOSCOU /Tour – France
- 1992 – CARNIVAL PLAZA – Japan
- 1998 – COMEDY SHOW – PANORAMA PARK THEATER – Germany
- 2002 – New Year Events with "Fern Street Circus" San Diego – U.S.A.
- 2007–2008 in the show with "CIRQUE LE MASQUE" – U.S.A.

also – Germany, Switzerland, Finland, Japan

== Moscow New Drama Theatre ==
- ~1981 – THE MONOLOGUE ON CITY-PLACE – (Director: Svetlana Vragova) – Role: CLOWN

== The Walt Disney Company ==
- 2000 – “C’est Magique” (Disney Cruise Line main stage Disney Magic) – lead role: Morty
- 2001–2002 “Pluto & Dog Catcher (Tokyo DisneySea) – role: Dog Catcher
- 2003–2006 Smear, Splat & Dip (Disney's Animal Kingdom) – role: Dip
- 2006 – Park Business Development (Epcot) – role: Voice Over

== Filmography ==
=== As an actor ===
- 1983 – UNDER 16 AND OLDER (Russian: До 16 и старше…) – TV Studio SHABOLOVKA – Role: SERGEY PAVLOV
- 1983 – O strannostyakh lyubvi (Russian: О странностях любви)- role: stunt man of lead character
- 1984 – BUDILNIK (Russian: Будильник) – role: Clown
- 1984 – Shutki v storonu (Russian: Шутки в сторону) – role: kitchen worker
- 1986 – RATTLING DOZEN (Russian: Гремучая Дюжина) – Musical (Studio Ekran)– role: tap dancer
- 1993 – Pierot and Harlequin (Russian: Пьеро и Арлекин) – (student screen work) (IPK) – role: Harlekin
- 1994 – Only you (video) (old title – "Podlets" (Russian: Подлец) – (diploma screen work) – (IPK)
- 1995 – Chocolate (video) (Russian: Конфетка) Spokoynoy nochi, malyshi! TV Studio OSTANKONO – role: Clown LALALA
- 1995 – Gift (video) (Russian: Подарок) Spokoynoy nochi, malyshi! TV Studio OSTANKONO – role: Clown LALALA
- 1995 – SOMEBODY SLY... (Russian: Кто-то хитрый…) – (Russian Rock band "Chaif" – (Muz-TV) – role: Clown LALALA
- 2008 – LALALA SHOW (promo reel) (video) – role: Clown LALALA

=== As a film director ===
- 1993 – Pierot and Harlequin (Russian: Пьеро и Арлекин) – (student screen work) (IPK)
- 1994 – Only you (video) (old title – "Podlets" (Russian: Подлец) – (diploma screen work) – (IPK)
- 1995 – Chocolate (video) (Russian: Конфетка) Spokoynoy nochi, malyshi! TV Studio OSTANKONO
- 1995 – Gift (video) (Russian: Подарок) Spokoynoy nochi, malyshi! TV Studio OSTANKONO
- 2008 – LALALA SHOW (promo reel) (video)

=== As a writer ===
- 1993 – Pierot and Harlequin (Russian: Пьеро и Арлекин) – (student screen work) (IPK)
- 1994 – Only you (video) (old title – "Podlets" (Russian: Подлец) – (diploma screen work) – (IPK)
- 1995 – Chocolate (video) (Russian: Конфетка) Spokoynoy nochi, malyshi! TV Studio OSTANKONO
- 1995 – Gift (video) (Russian: Подарок) Spokoynoy nochi, malyshi! TV Studio OSTANKONO
- 2008 – LALALA SHOW (promo reel) (video)

=== As a composer ===
- 1993 – Pierot and Harlequin (Russian: Пьеро и Арлекин) – (student screen work) IPK(IPK)
- 1995 – Chocolate (video) (Russian: Конфетка) Spokoynoy nochi, malyshi! TV Studio OSTANKONO
- 2008 – LALALA SHOW (promo reel) Music and Soundtrack (video)

==== Radio of Russia ====
On 1996 two songs sounded by Sergey Pavlov (guitar and vocal)

- Funny Old Man – words: Daniil Kharms, music: S. Pavlov
- Left Socks Thieves- words: Dr. Seuss (Russian translation by G. Kruzhkov), music: S. Pavlov

== The Trick ==
On 1984 Sergey Pavlov has created the new unique trick - "Rope Skips on the Slack Wire" (video).

According to the Russian Encyclopedia of Circus and Variety Arts (Энциклопедия циркового и эстрадного искусства) this trick was extremely difficult to perform due to the fact that slackwire (also called free wire) tricks involve a mastery in balance.

The trick is the highest complexity. Jumps are executing in succession in the temp.

Usually Sergey Pavlov performed in his show promptly 3, sometimes 4 rope skips on the slack wire.

- 2009 – Five rope skips balancing on Slack Wire (video)

S. Pavlov's record is seven skips in the temp.
