= Alfred Court =

French animal trainer (1883-1977)

- Born: Marie Alfred Charles Louis Court; January 1, 1883; Marseille, France
- Died: July 14, 1977 (aged 94); Nice, France
- Occupations: Performer; circus proprietor; animal trainer
- Employer(s): Ringling Bros. and Barnum & Bailey Circus
- Spouse: Renée Vasserot
- Relatives: Jules Court (brother); Alexandre Clapier (grandfather)

Alfred Court (January 1, 1883 – July 14, 1977) was a French acrobat, circus proprietor, and animal trainer. His act was a feature of Ringling Bros. and Barnum & Bailey Circus during the 1940s.

== Early life and education ==
Alfred Court was born on January 1, 1883, in Marseille, France. He was born to an aristocratic French family. His grandfather was the Marquis de Clapier.

Alfred's parents sent him to the Provence School ran by the Society of Jesus in Marseille. At fifteen, he ran away from the Jesuit school and joined a circus after being dragged home once before.

== Circus life ==
When Alfred Court first joined the circus, he began working variously as an acrobat, juggler, and ringmaster. At sixteen in 1899, Court and Alfred Lexton created the duo Lexton & Egelton, performing first at the Palais de la Jetée in Nice and then touring France and Italy with Circus Cristiani. Upon returning, Alfred Court joined forces with his older brother Jules as the "new" Egeltons, performing in a horizontal bar act. They found success in Europe and toured France with the French Cirque Pinder from 1905 to 1908, where Alfred met his future wife, the equestrienne Renée Vasserot. The brothers set up their first circus, Cirque Egelton, in Marseille in 1909, renaming it Cirque Standard in the last year before closing in 1913.

He created the Orpington Trio (French: Le Trio Orpington), a hand-to-hand acrobatic act, with his young wife Renée Vasserot, who oversaw finances, and a new student Louis Vernet. The trio toured France and later the Americas with Ringling Brothers Circus and Circo Européo.

At Barnum-Ringling, he met the renowned Codona trapeze family, and with them founded Circo Européo to tour South America. While running the circus, he traveled to Mexico and handled wild animals for the first time during the tour. In 1917, at age 35, he made his debut in a lion's cage after the scheduled tamer was found drunk, forcing the proprietor of the small circus to improvise mid-show. With no one else available, Alfred was forced to step in, though his experience was limited to watching the act. Later, a revolution in Santiago de Cuba destroyed Circo Européo, ending Alfred's career as an acrobat and leading him to focus on animal training on his return to Europe.

Alfred, accompanied by his wife Renée, went back to France in 1920. While touring North and South America from 1911 to 1920, Court saved more than 200,000 francs, then returned home to spend a season with Cirque Ancillotti-Plège.

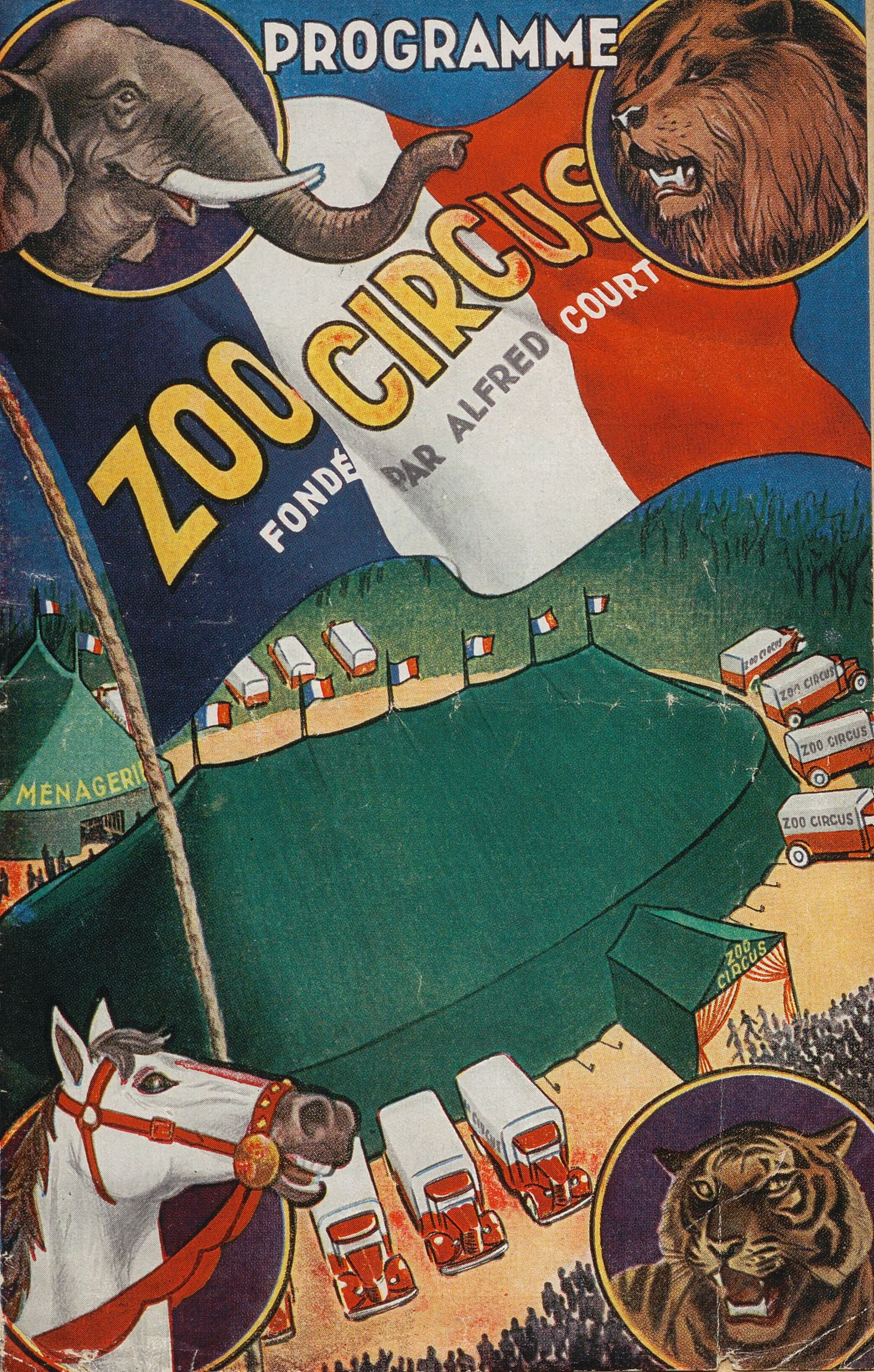

Alfred and his brother Jules Court founded the Zoo Circus, France's first modern circus-menagerie. They purchased the annex of the Remount Center in Bouilhaguet, near Miramont-de-Guyenne, before debuting the Zoo Circus in Limoges. The Zoo Circus thrived after the war but went into decline by 1928 and closed in 1932 as a result of bankruptcy.

By the mid-1930s, he shifted his focus to training big cats and tamers for other circuses. Court's most notable students included Frantz and Vojtek Trubka, Fritz Schultz, Vargas, Max Stolle, Wesely, Vaniek, Anton, Violette d'Argens, Patricia Bourne, Damoo Dhotre, and May Kovar.

Signing with Blackpool Tower Circus in England for 1937, Alfred Court delivered nearly 500 consecutive performances in 23 weeks without mishap.

For a short period, he formed Olympia Circus (French: Cirque Olympia) to tour France and Spain, but the venture was short-lived. The Olympia Circus opened in Vitoria for three days, then headed back to France by the end of July.

After his circus was shut down, he formed a group of fifteen big cats, including six spotted leopards, three black leopards, one snow leopard, one jaguar, and four pumas. He prepared an act to rent out as he toured Europe until the Second World War began. Alfred Court trained wild animals using verbal commands, spending eighteen months and six to eight hours daily perfecting a mixed act. He first studied each animal's traits, then built on its natural reactions through constant repetition. During the act, he carried a whip and a small stick, but no gun. He used the whip only to crack and signal where the animals should position themselves, with the lash and his voice guiding them.

John Ringling North spent several years trying to bring Court to America, but the renowned Frenchman preferred to stay in his homeland. In December 1939, as head of the Greatest Show on Earth, North convinced him to spend a season overseas. North had personally traveled to Europe to recruit talent before wartime restrictions when Court finally agreed to join the show.

For the 1940 season, the famous French circus act imported from abroad joined the Ringling Brothers and Barnum and Bailey Circus. When Court appeared with the Ringling-Barnum show in 1940, he brought together three mixed groups of wild animals. Two of Court's acts came from Norway and Sweden, and a third from England, where they had been working when the war began. The acts took place simultaneously in three large steel-barred arenas. Court's act, unlike anything seen before in America, included Abyssinian lions, Bengal tigers, black and spotted leopards, black panthers, Siberian snow leopards, black jaguars, pumas, cougars, giant ocelots, Himalayan bears, Tibetan bears, Polar bears, and Great Danes. No other trainer combined as many different species in one performance. He described his acts as "Beasts under the reign of peace". Court along with his assistant trainers presented the three rings of caged wild animals.

At the season's opening in April 1940, his American debut was set for Madison Square Garden in New York City. Just before rehearsals of his animal act, an Indian leopard killed the only performing snow leopard in captivity and clawed Alfred Court's face. When Court was leading his leopards from the Rangers' dressing room to the arena, the Indian leopard attacked the snow leopard, sinking its jaws into its throat. The rehearsal was delayed for hours. The cages for Court's tigers, lions, leopards, and jaguars were already set up, but Fred Bradna, the equestrian director, refused to rehearse without Court's animals. Later, another leopard slipped out of its cage, causing a minor scare.

In February 1942, Court worked at Ringling's winter quarters in Sarasota, Florida, preparing a new cat act for the New York City opening. The show already featured leaping leopards, jaguars, and lions, but no tigers. Court trained his tigers to outleap the lions and leopards at 23 feet. Some of his new tigers—including giant Siberians—even walked tightropes: two parallel ropes stretched a foot apart across the arena. He trained the mixed group in under three months, debuting them in the center ring at Madison Square Garden in early April 1942. Ringling-Barnum featured the mixed cat act in its center ring for several seasons.

Alfred Court's act opened the Ringling-Barnum matinee on July 6, 1944, moments before the Hartford circus fire.

At the end of 1944, Court approached Robert Edward Ringling, then president of Ringling Brothers-Barnum and Bailey Combined Shows Inc., to sell his animals. Ringling's agreement was conditional on Court training a new act for the 1945 season. Alfred Court created the act for Ringling, and it was performed in a single ring by William "Willie" Storey, Court's nephew and apprentice who went to America with him.

Court, after selling his animals to the Ringling show, lived part-time in France and part-time in Sarasota, Florida.

In the year of 1945, his company, Wild Animals, Inc., presented Joe Walsh with his mixed group of tigers and lions. The act was booked with the Hamid-Morton Circus for their winter, spring and fall dates. Court leased his act to Herman Bantly's All-American Shows in August 1945. In 1946, Alfred Court's Wild Animal Exhibition made an appearance at Saladin Temple's annual Shrine Circus in Grand Rapids.

Court, who had sold the big cats to Ringling-Barnum before returning to France, came back to Florida in 1950 when the circus sought to dispose of them. He promptly resold them to Cirque Amar and arranged for Damoo Dhotre to handle the act.

== Death ==
Alfred Court died in Nice, France, in 1977.

== Legacy ==
The Club du Cirque de France, headed by circus historian Henry Thétard, hosted Court as guest of honor at a dinner on June 22, 1942.

His book, My Life with the Big Cats, was published in 1955.

In 1975, Court was elected to the Circus Hall of Fame. He was inducted into the Circus Ring of Fame in 2000.
