= Ella Bradna =

Bohemian-born equestrian circus performer

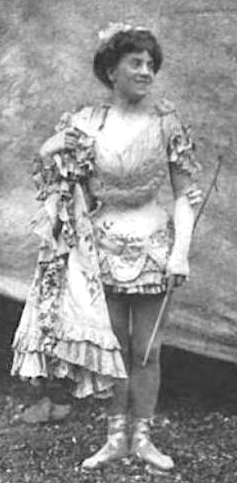
- Ella Bradna, from a 1907 publication.
- Born: February 22, 1879; Bohemia
- Died: November 12, 1957 (aged 78); Sarasota, Florida
- Other name: Madame Bradna
- Occupation: Equestrian performer
- Spouse: Fred Bradna
- Relatives: Olympe Bradna (niece)

Ella Bradna (February 22, 1879 – November 12, 1957) was a Bohemian-born equestrian circus performer in the United States.

== Early life ==
Ella Bradna was born into a circus family in Bohemia, the daughter of Johan Bradna. Actress Olympe Bradna was her niece. Ella Bradna toured with her family as a child, eventually replacing her injured older sister Beata at doing equestrian trick riding.

== Career ==
In 1901, Bradna joined the Nouveau Cirque in Paris, and performed at London's Hippodrome in 1902. She moved to the United States in 1903, with her husband, to join the Barnum and Bailey Circus. They also brought their act to vaudeville and toured Cuba and South America. She raised and bred her own horses for the act, on a farm on Long Island. Ella Bradna developed a less physically-demanding act, "the Act Beautiful", involving a white horse, white doves, and a white dog, before she retired from performing in the 1930s. She continued working with horses in the circus, as her husband was the circus ringmaster. She and her husband survived the fatal Hartford Circus Fire in 1944, and retired the following year.

== Personal life ==
Bradna was married to an Alsatian cavalryman, Fred Ferbere (Bradna was her surname from birth; he began using the name when they married). Fred Bradna wrote a memoir of their lives in the circus, The Big Top (1952, with Hartzell Spence). Ella Bradna was widowed in 1955, and she died in 1957, aged 78 years. (One obituary gave her age at death as 84 years.) There is a historical marker about Ella and Fred Bradna in Sarasota County, near those of other circus notables, in the "Circus Ring of Fame."
