= Chocolat (2016 film) =

- Theatrical release poster
- Directed by: Roschdy Zem
- Written by: Roschdy Zem; Cyril Gely; Olivier Gorce; Gérard Noiriel
- Based on: Chocolat, clown nègre. L'histoire oubliée du premier artiste noir de la scène française by Gérard Noiriel
- Produced by: Éric Altmayer; Nicolas Altmayer
- Starring: Omar Sy; James Thiérrée
- Cinematography: Thomas Letellier
- Edited by: Monica Coleman
- Music by: Gabriel Yared
- Production company: Mandarin Cinéma
- Distributed by: Gaumont
- Release date: 3 February 2016
- Running time: 110 minutes
- Country: France
- Language: French
- Budget: $21 million
- Box office: $15.3 million

Chocolat is a 2016 French drama film directed by Roschdy Zem and starring Omar Sy and James Thiérrée.

== Synopsis ==
The clown Chocolat becomes, in 1886, the first black artist of the French scene.

== Plot ==
In 1897, a black man, the son of former Cuban slave, plays a small role as the cannibal Kananga in the modest circus Delvaux. George Foottit, a white clown, is asked by the director to bring up his routine. He gets the idea to have an act with Kananga; a white authoritarian clown and a black scapegoat named Chocolat.

They are well received and the word spreads through France, reaching Joseph Oller, director of the Nouveau Cirque. He asks Foottit and Chocolat to take their show to his Parisian establishment. The success is immediate, and Chocolat becomes the first famous black clown. The success stirs envy in his previous employer's wife. She denounces him for being in France illegally.

Chocolat is arrested and tortured by the police. "A negro always remains a negro," the police commander tells Chocolat when he releases him. While the humiliation in the circus act is staged for humorous effect, the racism Chocolat encounters in France grinds him down. Chocolat is both celebrated as a star and made into a racial caricature. This becomes strikingly apparent when the poster for the show depicts Chocolat as a black stereotype. Faced with the hypocrisy of French society, he gives himself up to gambling, drugs and women. An attempt to end his clown duo to branch into the Shakesperean tragedy Othello ends with part of the audience booing the premiere. At the end of his life, Chocolat falls into obscurity and dies of consumption.

== Historical accuracy ==
The film is only loosely based on the real life of Rafael Padilla, son of a slave from Cuba, a Spanish colony at the time.

== References to other films ==
French: Chaise en bascule, lit. 'The tilting chair', featuring Chocolat and Foottit.

The film shows Foottit and Chocolat being filmed by Louis and Auguste Lumière. During the credits, the Lumière film The Tilting Chair featuring the real clowns is shown.

== Cast ==
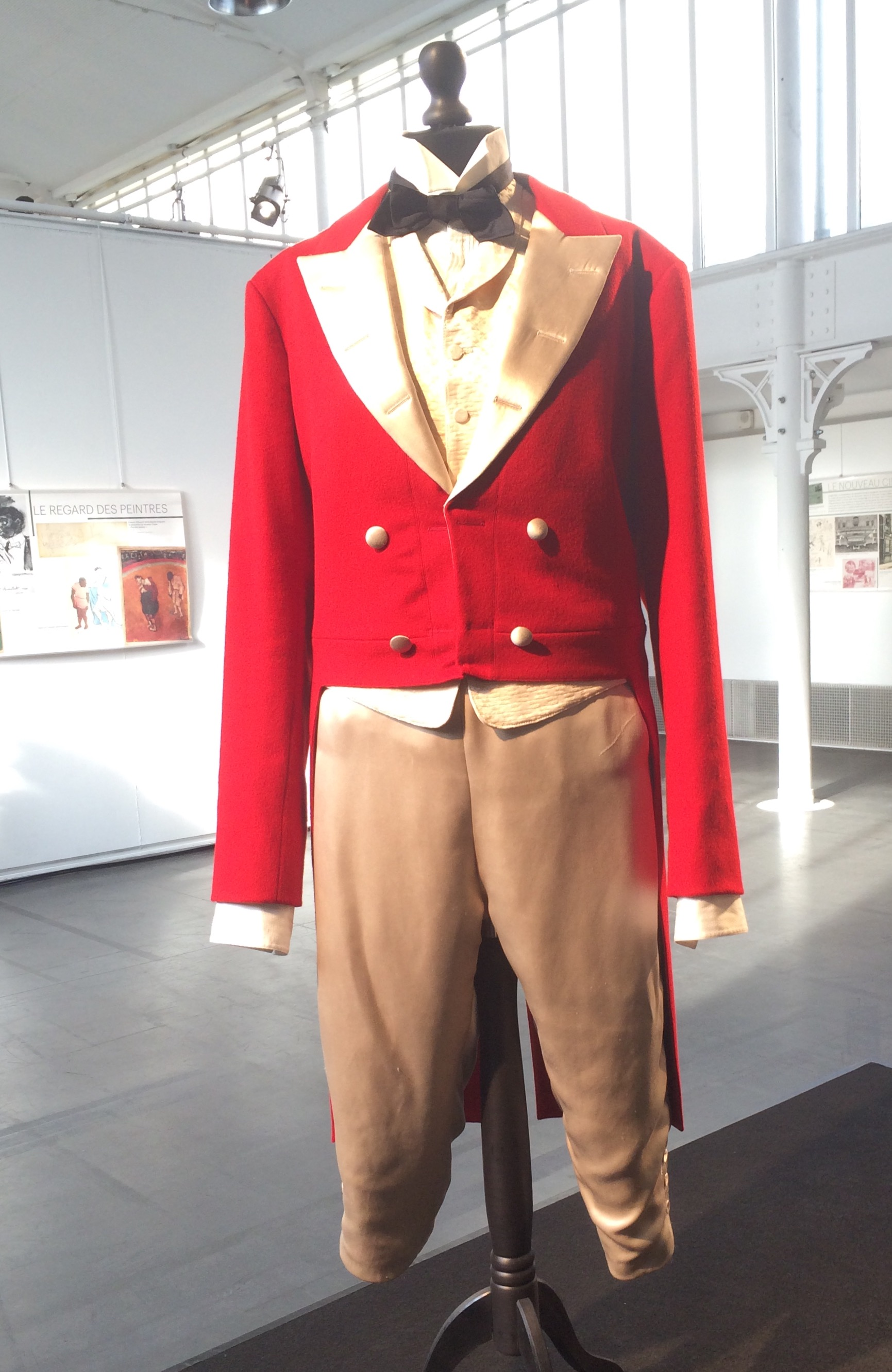
Scene costume used by Omar Sy as Chocolat.

- Omar Sy as Chocolat
- James Thiérrée as George Foottit
- Clotilde Hesme as Marie
- Olivier Gourmet as Joseph Oller
- Frédéric Pierrot as Monsieur Delvaux
- Noémie Lvovsky as Madame Delvaux
- Alice de Lencquesaing as Camille
- Alex Descas as Victor
- Olivier Rabourdin as Firmin Gémier
- Xavier Beauvois as Jacques Potin
- Denis and Bruno Podalydès as Auguste and Louis Lumière
- Thibault de Montalembert as Jules Moy
- Héléna Soubeyrand as Régina Badet
- Christophe Fluder as Marval
- Antonin Maurel as Ortis
- Mick Holsbeke as Green

== Reception ==
Review aggregator Rotten Tomatoes reports a 100% approval rating based on 23 reviews, with a weighted average of 7/10. It grossed $15.2 million at the box office.

=== Awards ===
Award / Pelicula Festival	Category	Nominations	Outcomes
César Awards	Best Actor	Omar Sy	Nominated
César Awards	Best Supporting Actor	James Thiérrée	Won
César Awards	Best Sound	Brigitte Taillandier, Vincent Guillon and Stéphane Thiébaut	Nominated
César Awards	Best Original Music	Gabriel Yared	Nominated
César Awards	Best Production Design	Jérémie D. Lignol	Won
Globe de Cristal Awards	Best movie		Won
Globe de Cristal Awards	Best actor	Omar Sy	Won
Lumière Awards	Best Actor	Omar Sy	Nominated
Lumière Awards	Best Actor	James Thiérrée	Nominated
