= Selika Lazevski =

1800s black Frenchwoman

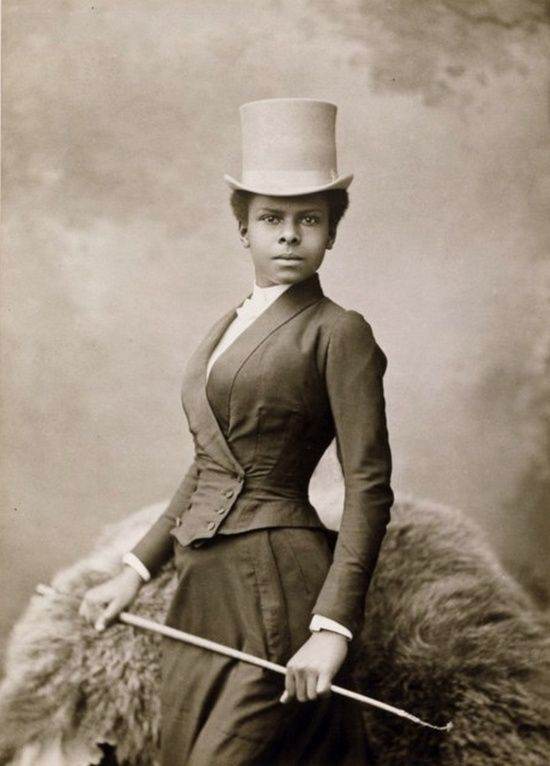
Selika Lazevski. Studio of Félix Nadar, Paris, 1891.

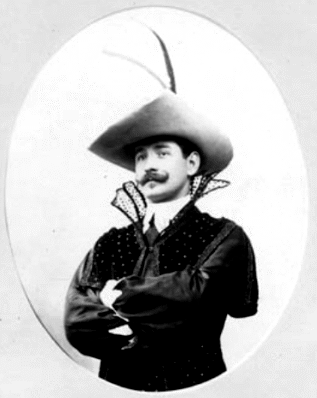
Valli de Laszewski

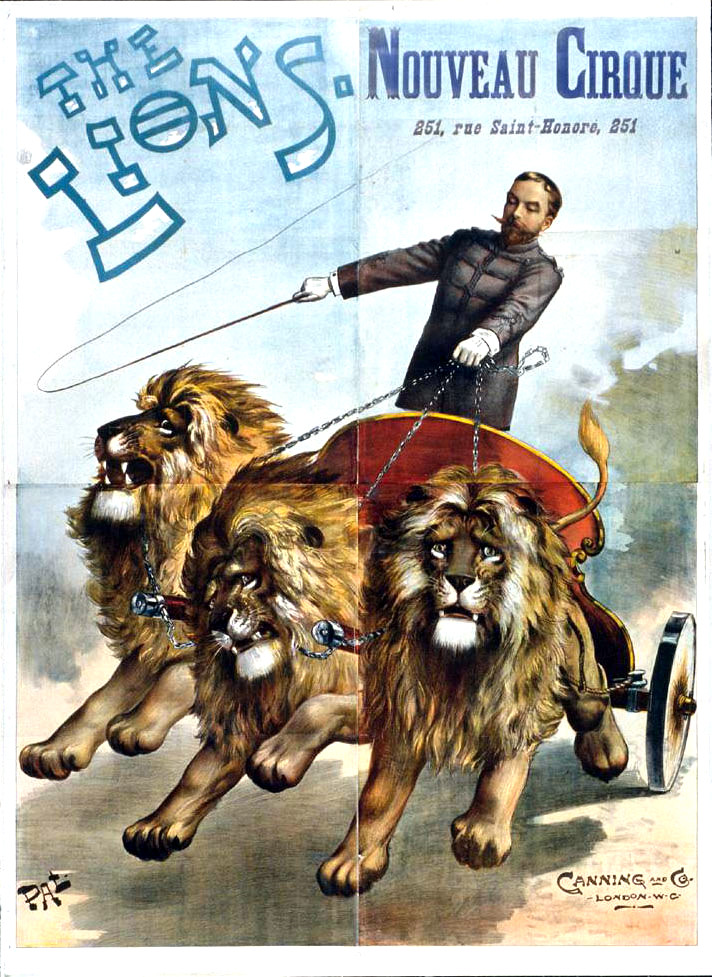
Poster for "The Lions - Nouveau Cirque", c. 1893.

Selika Lazevski was a black horsewoman in Belle Époque Paris. In 1891, she was the subject of a series of six photographic portraits taken at the studio of Paul Nadar in Paris.

== Life ==
Little is known of her life but she is thought to have been a horsewoman who rode haute école at the Nouveau Cirque (1886–1926) on rue Saint-Honoré, Paris. Selika may not have been her real first name and there is a possibility that she took her surname Lazevski from the Polish circus horseman and haute école rider Valli de Laszewski and his French wife, Lara, who worked at the Nouveau Cirque during that period.

In 1891, Lazevski was the subject of a series of six photographic portraits taken at the studio of Paul Nadar (son of the better known Félix Nadar) in Paris.

== Legacy ==
In 2017, a short film based on Lazevski's life, The Adventures of Selika, starring Karidja Touré, was released.

At the 2025 MET Gala, actress Jodie Turner-Smith paid visual homage to Lazevski.
