= Lapeyrère (disambiguation) =

Lapeyrère may refer to:

== People ==
- Josée Lapeyrère (1944–2007), French writer and psychoanalyst
- Augustin Boué de Lapeyrère (1852–1924), French admiral and Minister of the Navy 1909–1911
- Jeanne-Thérèse Lapeyrère (1845–1907), French writer, mainly under the pen name Paul Aigremont
- Albert Lapeyrère (1908–1996), French musician, singer and conductor, also known as Fred Adison
- Isaac La Peyrère (1596–1676), French philosopher and theologian

== Place Names ==
Antarctica

- Lapeyrère Bay, in the Palmer Archipelago

Canada (Québec)

- Lac-Lapeyrère, Quebec, unorganized territory in Portneuf, Capitale-Nationale

France

- Lapeyrère (Haute-Garonne), commune (town) of Haute-Garonne, Midi-Pyrénées
