= Fred Bradna =

French-American circus performer (1871-1955)

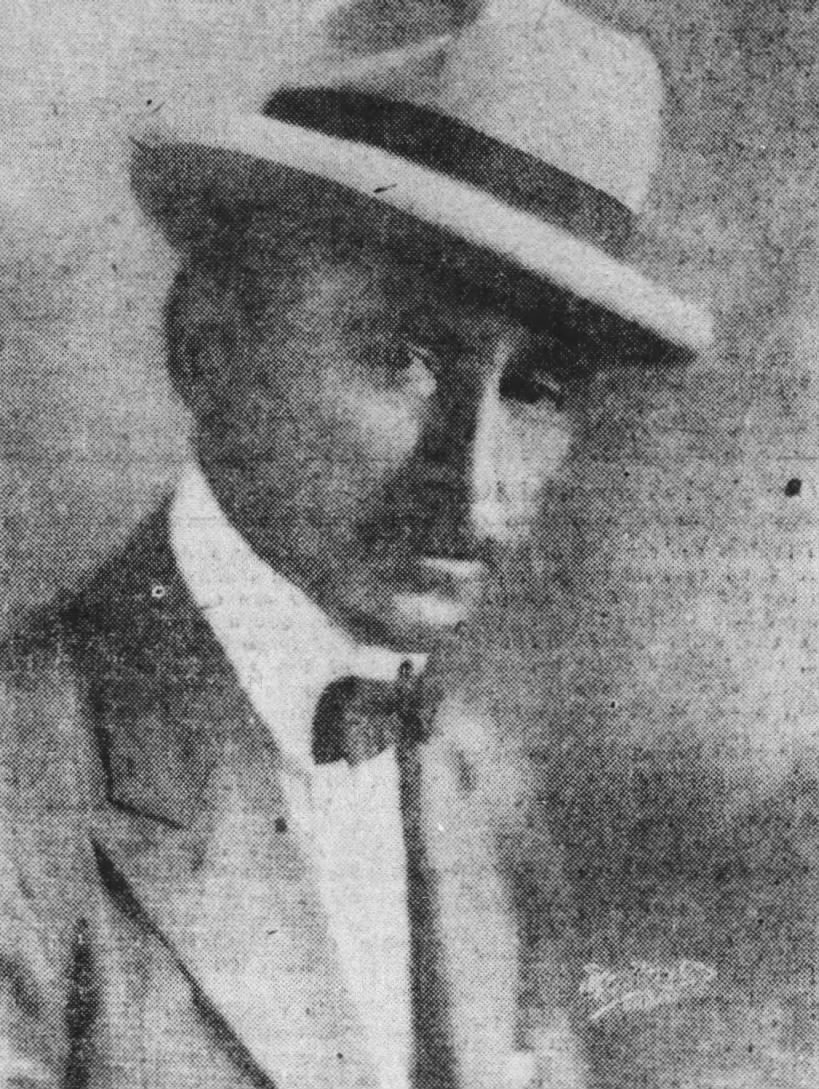
- Born: Frederick Ferbere; 28 May 1871; Strasbourg, Alsace, France
- Died: 21 February 1955 (aged 83); Sarasota, Sarasota County, Florida, United States
- Other names: Mr. Circus
- Occupation: Showman
- Employer: Ringling Bros. and Barnum & Bailey Circus
- Spouse: Ella Bradna
- Awards: Circus Hall of Fame (1960)

Fred Bradna (born Frederick Ferbere; 28 May 1871 – 21 February 1955) was a French-American circus performer and ringmaster with Ringling Brothers and Barnum and Bailey Circus.

== Early life ==
Frederick Ferbere was born in Strasbourg, Alsace, France on 28 May 1871.

He was the son of a well-off brewer from Alsace. His father made sure he graduated from Strassburg's schools with honors. He mastered five languages: French, German, Italian, Spanish, and English.

At the age of 9, he began working with four- and six-horse teams that hauled heavy beer barrels for his father's brewery.

As a teenager, he spent three years as Europe's amateur pole vault record holder. He held the record from 1888, 1889, and 1890 with 11 feet ½ inch.

Bradna was drafted into the Imperial German Army for five years of service, a result of his residence in Alsace–Lorraine. Opting for the light cavalry, he served with the Dieuze garrison, which at one point performed trick riding before Kaiser Wilhelm II and Otto von Bismarck. During his military service, he rose to first lieutenant in the 8th Regiment of Chevau-légers.

Returning to civilian life, he joined the Poppescu Brothers' horizontal bar act. While playing the Albert Schumann Circus in Vienna, he met bareback rider Ella Bradna (1879–1957). In 1900, Fred attended the Nouveau Cirque in Paris, France. During an equestrian act, Ella fell from her horse into his lap, sparking their romance. Febere relinquished his position as a German cavalry officer and renounced his inheritance of the family brewing business to marry the bareback rider and enter circus life. He adopted his wife's surname, more popular in the circus industry, leaving behind the name Ferbere.

== Circus life ==
Once a German Army officer, he reinvented himself as a circus gymnast and rider. He had experience on the horizontal bars before performing alongside his wife in equestrian acts.

In 1902, American circus owner James Anthony Bailey spotted his wife's talent at the London Hippodrome and signed her for the 1903 season. Arriving in New York in 1903, the couple joined the Barnum & Bailey Circus as riders. During his early days in America, he also pitched in with setup duties, pulling stakes and rolling canvas for the main circus tent.

When the Ringling brothers acquired Barnum & Bailey Ltd. in 1907, Fred and Ella Bradna remained part of the company. He was appointed equestrian director in 1911 and began serving as William E. Gorman's assistant with the Ringling show.

From 1913 to 1918, he was parade marshal of Barnum & Bailey. Bradna, who oversaw the circus's daily parades, developed connections with numerous police chiefs and officials to coordinate parade routes.

After serving as assistant ringmaster, Fred Bradna was appointed equestrian director of the Ringling Bros. Circus on 31 May 1915. His official title was General Equestrian Director. Succeeding Al Ringling, he ran a well-balanced circus program, directing and aligning the various acts. It was his duty as stage manager and master of ceremonies to keep the performers sharp and the show running to the exact two-hour-and-twenty-minute mark.

He escorted American President Woodrow Wilson into the Barnum & Bailey Circus in 1916, when Wilson threw his hat into the center ring to announce his intentions to seek reelection. Bradna was also the circus host for other dignitaries. He was on the staff of the short-lived R. T. Richards Supreme Show of the World in 1917-1918.

In 1919, the Barnum & Bailey Circus was merged with the Ringling Brothers Circus. Bradna continued serving as parade marshal that year for Ringling-Barnum.

During the winter months, he played vaudeville and toured Cuba and South America, where he often joined the Santos & Artigas Circus ('Gran Circo Santos y Artigas').

Over forty-two years with the circus, he endured storms, floods, mud, flies, ptomaine, fires, train wrecks, blowdowns, and mergers. He witnessed the Hartford circus fire on 6 July 1944, in which 168 lives were lost.

While working a 1945 show in Dallas, he was knocked down by a 460-pound quarter pole during a storm, ending his time on the road. He had suffered a fractured right hip and was sent to Baylor Hospital. Bradna stepped down from the circus that year, earning the title of equestrian director emeritus.

== Death ==
Fred Bradna died at 83 years old on 21 February 1955 in Sarasota, Sarasota County, Florida, United States. He was laid to rest in Sarasota, with show people and long-time friends in attendance.

== Legacy ==
By the time he retired, Bradna had traveled 1,000,000 miles and appeared before an estimated 750 million spectators.

His 1952 autobiography with Hartzell Spence was titled The Big Top: My 40 Years with the Greatest Show on Earth.

Fred Bradna was posthumously inducted into the International Circus Hall of Fame in 1960. He and his wife, Ella, were inducted into the Circus Ring of Fame in 1996.
