= Say It in French =

1938 film by Andrew L. Stone

- Theatrical release poster
- Directed by: Andrew L. Stone
- Screenplay by: Frederick J. Jackson; Jacques Deval (play)
- Produced by: Andrew L. Stone
- Starring: Ray Milland; Olympe Bradna; Irene Hervey; Janet Beecher; Mary Carlisle; Holmes Herbert
- Cinematography: Victor Milner
- Edited by: LeRoy Stone
- Music by: Boris Morros
- Production company: Paramount Pictures
- Distributed by: Paramount Pictures
- Release date: 1938
- Running time: 70 minutes
- Country: United States
- Language: English

Say It in French is a 1938 American comedy film directed by Andrew L. Stone and written by Frederick J. Jackson. The film stars Ray Milland, Olympe Bradna, Irene Hervey, Janet Beecher, Mary Carlisle and Holmes Herbert. The film was released by Paramount Pictures.

== Plot ==
A family with financial problems arranges a wedding between their pro golfer son and a wealthy heiress, however, they don't know that the son already got married while playing a tournament in France.

== Other information ==
Evelyn Keyes was originally cast as Julie, despite being only 18 and fairly unknown. In her memoir, she claimed that director Andrew Stone raped her, and then fired her from the film after she needed to recover from an abortion.

== Cast ==
- Ray Milland as Richard Carrington, Jr.
- Olympe Bradna as Julie
- Irene Hervey as Auriol Marsden
- Janet Beecher as Mrs. Carrington
- Mary Carlisle as Phyllis Carrington
- Holmes Herbert as Richard Carrington Sr.
- Walter Kingsford as Hopkins
- William Collier, Sr. as Howland
- Erik Rhodes as Irving
- Mona Barrie as Lady Westover
- G. P. Huntley as Lord Westover
- Gertrude Sutton as Daisy
- Forbes Murray as Dr. Van Gulden
