= One Foot in Heaven =

1941 US film directed by Irving Rapper

- Original promo poster for One Foot in Heaven
- Directed by: Irving Rapper
- Screenplay by: Casey Robinson
- Based on: One Foot in Heaven; 1940 book by Hartzell Spence
- Produced by: Irving Rapper
- Starring: Fredric March; Martha Scott; Beulah Bondi; Gene Lockhart
- Cinematography: Charles Rosher
- Edited by: Warren Low
- Music by: Max Steiner
- Production company: Warner Bros. Pictures
- Distributed by: Warner Bros. Pictures
- Release date: October 2, 1941
- Running time: 108 minutes
- Country: United States
- Language: English

One Foot in Heaven is a 1941 American biographical drama film directed by Irving Rapper and starring Fredric March, Martha Scott, Beulah Bondi, Gene Lockhart and Elisabeth Fraser. The film was adapted by Casey Robinson from the autobiography by Hartzell Spence. It was produced and distributed by Warner Bros. Pictures. It was nominated for the Academy Award for Best Picture.

== Plot ==
In Stratford, Ontario, in 1904, William Spence (Fredric March), a medical student on the verge of becoming a doctor, receives "The Call" while passing a Methodist church one Sunday. His bride-to-be, Hope Morris (Martha Scott), accepts his decision to enter the ministry with a whole heart despite the disappointment of her prominent and affluent parents.

Will "dives right in," but, with no vacancies in Canada, is posted as a circuit minister to a small town in rural Iowa, beginning a life for them of frequent moves around the district, dingy parsonages, and scraping a living from poor boxes and performing weddings. Hope yearns for a decent parsonage and a sense of permanence for their children, but uncomplainingly provides them a good life and a supportive home for Will.

For his part, Will understands his own nature and laughs at his own foibles, bending where he can in good conscience. He often enters situations in anger or to instruct but leaves humbled and renewed in spirit. While Will sincerely lives by and teaches by example (which includes his family) the tenets of the Methodist Discipline, he also learns from his congregations to be flexible and change with the times.

When their third child, a boy, is born, Hope and Will cannot agree on a name and he remains unbaptized for three months. Hope wants to name the baby William Spence Jr., but Will does not like the idea of his son going without a middle name as he did. He wants the boy to have and be called in "the good old Canadian custom" by the middle name of Frazer. Will seems to give in to Hope but the following Sunday baptizes him William Frazer Spence. Hope serenely accepts the change.

Oldest son Hartzell (named for Will's guiding bishop) has a hard time coping with the idea that a minister's son should be an example to the other boys. Will explains that "a pastor's family walks a tightrope, balancing with one foot on earth and one foot already in Heaven." After learning that Hartzell has been sneaking into the movies, a pastime seemingly forbidden by the Discipline, Will takes him to the theater to point out why the film is bad for him. They see a western but rather than finding it sinful, Will is impressed by its moral. The following Sunday he preaches a sermon advising his congregation that young people may have something to teach their elders.

In the 1920s, the family is assigned to a church in Denver, Colorado, that, despite having many well-heeled members, is old, uncomfortable and decrepit. In a time of economic prosperity for the country, the Spences cope with possibly their most dilapidated parsonage yet. Will has come to appreciate his wife's serenity with life and resolves to provide her a decent parsonage by building a new church.

His plans at first are thwarted by power struggles among several snobbish members of the church. He loses one wealthy patron, Mrs. Sandow (Beulah Bondi), to the Baptists when he refuses to stop ministering to her chauffeur (Harry Davenport), and another, influential banker Preston Thurston (Gene Lockhart), after organizing a children's choir to replace the off-key church choir, run for years by Mrs. Thurston (Laura Hope Crews), her family and social circle. Soon after, Hartzell (Frankie Thomas) is expelled from school because of a gossip campaign falsely accusing him of making a young girl pregnant and forcing her family to move to San Francisco.

A deeply discouraged Will investigates a job offer in California that offers the beautiful church and parsonage he and Hope have always dreamed of but discovers that he cannot surrender in his struggles with the Thurstons. He seeks out the girl's family and learns that there is no truth to any part of the rumor. Returning to Denver, Will confronts Mrs. Thurston and her circle, who started the rumors to punish Will, and suggests that if they don't contribute substantially to the building of the new church, he will call them out in his sermons.

A repentant Mrs. Sandow begs to return to the church and Will inveigles from her the stained glass window, new Skinner organ, and carillon that as luxuries are being cut from the plans to finance a recreation center for the church. A year later, their dream church and parsonage finished, Will accepts the challenge of returning to Iowa to aid a small church in trouble, confident that he leaves behind a revitalized church when its members, including all those with whom he locked horns, gather spontaneously on a weekday morning to sing "The Church's One Foundation" as he plays it on the new carillon.

== Cast ==
- Fredric March as William Spence
- Martha Scott as Hope Morris Spence
- Beulah Bondi as Mrs. Lydia Sandow
- Gene Lockhart as Preston Thurston
- Elisabeth Fraser as Eileen Spence (aged 17)
- Harry Davenport as Elias Samson
- Laura Hope Crews as Mrs. Preston Thurston
- Grant Mitchell as Clayton Potter
- Moroni Olsen as Dr. John Romer
- Frankie Thomas as Hartzell Spence (aged 18)
- Jerome Cowan as Dr. Horrigan
- Ernest Cossart as Mr. John E. Morris
- Nana Bryant as Mrs. Morris
- Hobart Bosworth as Richard Hardy Case (uncredited)
- Mary Field as Tallulah 'Lulu' Digby (uncredited)
- Chester Conklin as Crying Man (uncredited)
- Jack Mower as Man at Baptism (uncredited)

== Reception ==
The film was received quite warmly both theatrically and critically, the New York Times calling it "a Fine and Human Story of a Minister's Life".

== Radio adaptation ==
On April 20, 1942, Lux Radio Theatre presented a 45-minute adaptation of One Foot in Heaven, with Fredric March and Martha Scott reprising their original roles. This program was fifteen minutes shorter than the usual 60 minutes in order to make room for a 15-minute government broadcast explaining upcoming World War II-related price controls. A second Lux radio adaptation of One Foot in Heaven, this time airing for a full hour on the summer series Lux Summer Theatre, aired on July 27, 1953, with Dana Andrews in the lead role.

== Notes ==
Olivia de Havilland was originally scheduled for the role of Hope Spence, but was moved over to star opposite Errol Flynn in They Died with Their Boots On.

Raymond Massey was Hartzell Spence's choice to play his father while his mother preferred Fredric March. The studio's decision to cast March was made independently of the family's wishes.

The Reverend Norman Vincent Peale was hired as a technical advisor on the film.

The film which Spence goes to see with Hartzell is William S. Hart's 1917 Western The Silent Man. At the Hollywood premiere of the film, Hart was a guest of honor.

In an uncredited role, Gig Young made one of his earlier on-screen performances as a dog groomer seeking a license.

The book on which the movie is based takes place and ends well before 1939. Therefore, the use of "Methodist Church" in the film is an anachronism because Methodist faith in America did not unify under the name "Methodist Church" until after the terms of reunification of the Methodist Episcopal Church, the Methodist Episcopal Church, South, and the Methodist Protestant Church were agreed upon and voted upon in Kansas City in 1939.
