= An Alligator Named Daisy =

1955 British film by J. Lee Thompson

- UK theatrical poster
- Directed by: J. Lee Thompson
- Written by: Jack Davies
- Based on: novel by Charles Terrot
- Produced by: Raymond Stross
- Starring: Donald Sinden; Jeannie Carson; James Robertson Justice; Diana Dors; Stanley Holloway
- Cinematography: Reginald H. Wyer
- Edited by: John D. Guthridge
- Production company: Group Film Productions
- Distributed by: Rank Organisation
- Release date: 13 December 1955
- Running time: 88 min
- Country: United Kingdom
- Language: English

An Alligator Named Daisy is a 1955 British comedy film directed by J. Lee Thompson and starring Donald Sinden, Jeannie Carson, James Robertson Justice, Diana Dors, Roland Culver and Stanley Holloway. It was written by Jack Davies based on the 1954 novel of the same name by Charles Terrot.

== Plot ==
Returning from a cricket match in Ireland, Peter Weston, an Englishman, is left with a pet alligator by another passenger who abandons it to him. Horrified, his first instinct is to get rid of it as soon as possible. However, he soon develops a bond with Moira, a young Irishwoman, which appears to be centred almost entirely around the animal. He soon discovers that Daisy is very tame and domesticated, and seems to be the way to Moira's heart.

Once back in London, Weston struggles to keep Daisy under control as she upsets his family, loses him his job at a department store and imperils his relationship with his fiancée Vanessa. He plans to get rid of Daisy, but the police and a pet shop refuse to take her so he abandons her in Regent's Park, later returning with a sense of guilt to rescue her. Owing to a mix-up, Daisy is packed along with the rest of his luggage and accompanies him to his prospective father-in-law's country house. There, Daisy escapes and causes mayhem at a big party, ending Vanessa and Weston's engagement.

Vanessa regrets the break-up and believes Weston didn't react correctly at the party because he gets upset when people are mean to Daisy. Vanessa's father, hating to see her upset, vows to make alligators the most popular pet in Britain. He uses his newspaper to lobby public opinion in favor of alligators and creates an alligator beauty contest.

At the Alligator Beauty Contest and Rally, Moira arrives with Albert, her "fiancé" and a male alligator Nelson. Vanessa talks with Albert and she realizes that Weston is not in love with her and they amicable breakup. However, Vanessa expresses she's sad for Weston as Moira and Albert are already married, as they have the same last name. The alligators in farcical fashion begin to revolt and wreak havoc, rushing into the lake and causing general chaos as the assembly try and corral them.

In the end, most of the guests end up in the lake and Weston discovers that Albert isn't Moira's husband, but her brother. Moira and Weston kiss and drive away together, the male and female alligators, Nelson and Daisy in the back seat.

== Cast ==
- Donald Sinden as Peter Weston
- Jeannie Carson as Moira O'Shannon (credited as Jean Carson))
- James Robertson Justice as Sir James Colbrooke
- Diana Dors as Vanessa Colbrooke
- Roland Culver as Mr Weston
- Stanley Holloway as The general
- Avice Landone as Mrs Weston
- Richard Wattis as Hoskins
- Stephen Boyd as Albert O'Shannon
- Ernest Thesiger as Notcher (uncredited)
- Henry Kendall as valet
- Michael Shepley as The judge
- Wilfrid Lawson as Irishman (uncredited)
- Charles Victor as sergeant (uncredited)
- George Moon as Al (uncredited)
- Margaret Rutherford as Prudence Croquet
- Joan Hickson as piano customer (uncredited)
- Jimmy Edwards as alligator owner (uncredited)
- Frankie Howerd as comedian (uncredited)
- George Woodbridge as PC Jorkins (uncredited)
- Colin Freear as garage boy (uncredited)

== Production ==
Film rights to the 1954 novel were bought by Raymond Stross in November 1954. He wanted Diana Dors, Janette Scott and Kenneth Moore to star.

Filming took place at Pinewood Studios between May and August 1955. It was Dors' third movie with Thompson.

The famous animal wrangler and circus performer Koringa was an alligator tamer for the film and at one point was bitten and had to be hospitalized. The star alligator of the film Daisy was a 6 year-old, five foot long, 44 pound alligator.

== Critical reception ==
The Monthly Film Bulletin wrote: "Three-quarters of this comedy depends on one joke: an alligator is found in an unlikely place. Apart from a faintly Kafkaesque scene in which Daisy is discovered in an upright piano, the situation is treated with little wit or comic invention, and aimless direction produces flat performances from the principals and gives small scope to the remarkable collection of small-part talent. In these tame surroundings, Harry Green's near-knockabout sequence at the expense of Denmark Street seems like sparkling satire. The staging and choreography of Jean Carson's dance sequence are deploringly unimaginative."

TV Guide wrote: "This very funny film has an excellent supporting cast." Filmink argued the film was "smart enough to feature Diana Dors and dumb enough to misuse her."

The New York Times found that despite "a curiously cute bit by Margaret Rutherford, as a pet-shop owner who talks to the animals in their own 'language' ... the joke wears thin."
