= Léo Brière =

French mentalist and illusionist

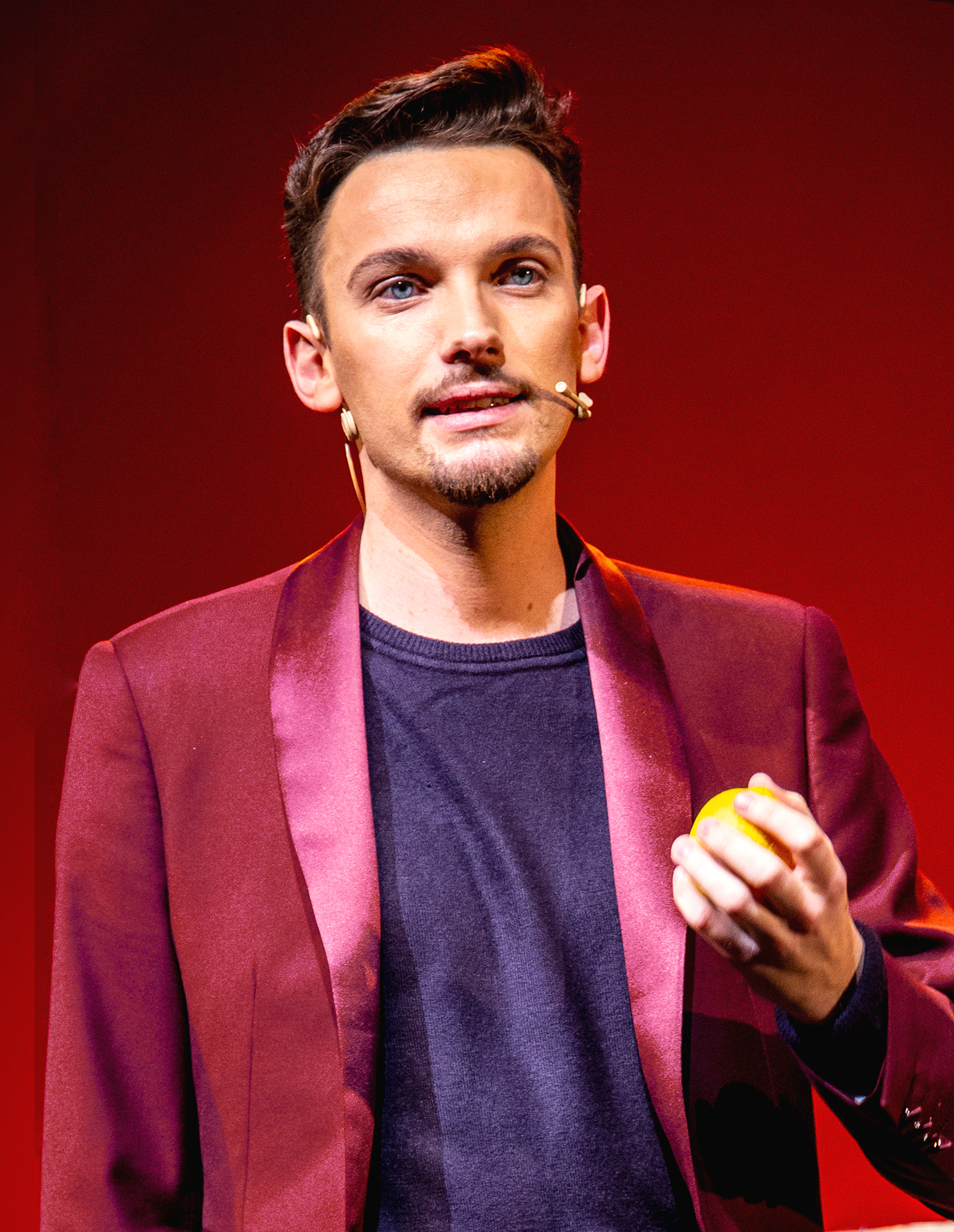
- Léo Brière, in February 2020
- Born: 11 January 1994 (age 32); Argentan
- Occupations: Mentalist, illusionist
- Years active: 2016–present
- Website: leobriere.com

Léo Brière (born 11 January 1994) is a French mentalist and illusionist, known to be winner at the French Magic Championship in 2019. In 2018, he appeared on France Got Talent where he goes to the semifinals.

== Personal life ==
Léo Brière was born in Argentan and grew up in Sées, in Normandy. He joined the French circus Pinder in 2012 at the age of 18 and became the youngest youngest in France by presenting the shows for two years.

At the age of 21, Léo Brière created Cirque Gold, where he did artistic direction and major illusions for six months.

== Career ==
Brière began his mentalist career in 2016 with his first show "Influence" in Paris during 2 years, and then, on tour in France. In 2018, he was a semi-finalist for season 13 of the TV show France Got Talent, during which he presents magic numbers from his second show "Premonition". On March 10, 2019, he won the 2019 French Magic Championship.

In 2021 he was a winner of a Mandrake d'Or.

=== Stage Shows ===
- 2016 / 2018 – Influence
- 2018 / 2019 – Prémonition
- 2020 - "L'experience interdite"

== Awards and nominations ==
- 2017 - Influence | FFAP's French magic show of the year 2017/2018 : Nominated
- 2019 - French Magic Championship 2019 : Won
- 2021 - Mandrake d'Or: Won
