= Olympe Bradna =

French actress (1920–2012)

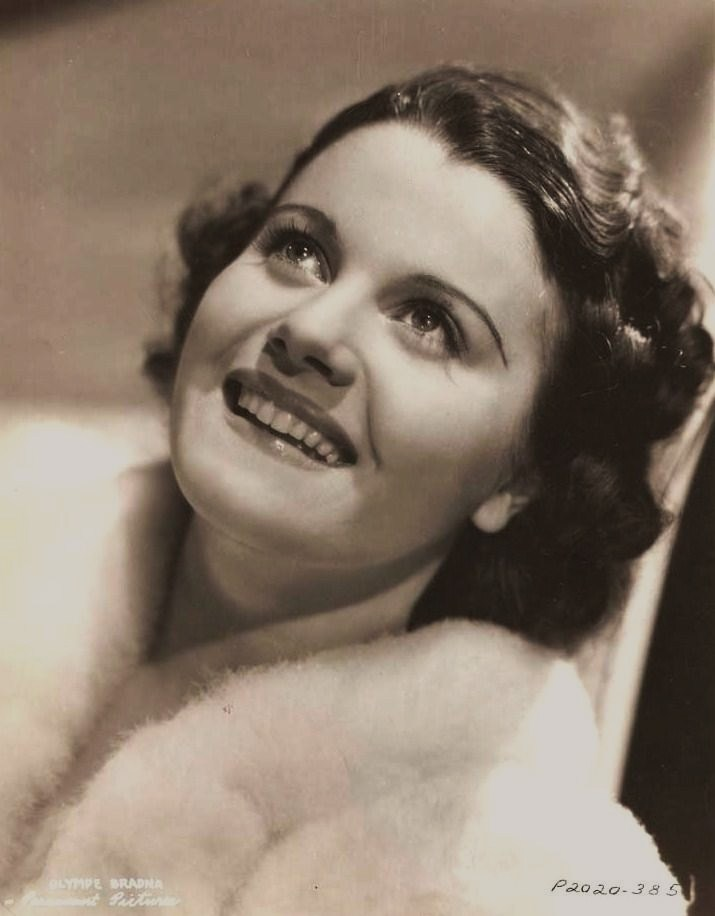
- Olympe Bradna in 1936, when she broke into film with Paramount Pictures
- Born: Antoinette Olympe Bradna; 12 August 1920; Paris, France
- Died: 5 November 2012 (aged 92); Lodi, California, U.S.
- Resting place: Stockton Rural Cemetery
- Occupations: Dancer, actress
- Years active: 1921–1941
- Spouse(s): Douglass Woods Wilhoit, Sr. (1941-2012) (his death) (3 children)
- Relatives: Ella Bradna (aunt)

Antoinette Olympe Bradna (12 August 1920 – 5 November 2012) was a French dancer and actress, who emigrated to the United States where she lived for the rest of her life.

== Early years ==
Bradna was born in a dressing room in the Olympic Theatre in Paris, and her full name was Antoinette Olympe Bradna. Her father, Joseph Bradna, was a Bohemian Czech and her mother, Jana Bradna, was Austrian German. (Another source says that her mother was French.) They were circus performers before Olympe began her career. (Jana Bradna had been an opera singer before she joined her husband in the circus.) Her aunt Ella Bradna also was in the circus, as an equestrienne. An item in a newspaper in 1936 reported that Bradna "followed a line of trained dogs on the stage in France, when she was only 18 months old."

== Dancing ==
Bradna appeared at 18 months of age with her parents, who were world-famous bare back riders. By the time she was 8, Bradna "had attracted so much attention that agents were anxious to book her as a 'single.'" Her parents accompanied her to Sweden, Norway, Germany, Switzerland, Italy, and France as she danced. She performed "an acrobatic dance" in the Paris, France, production of Hit the Deck.

Later she joined the Folies Bergère. She was with that group for eight months and danced at the French Casino in New York City for eight more months.

She danced in Stockholm, New York City, and other world capitals.

== Film ==
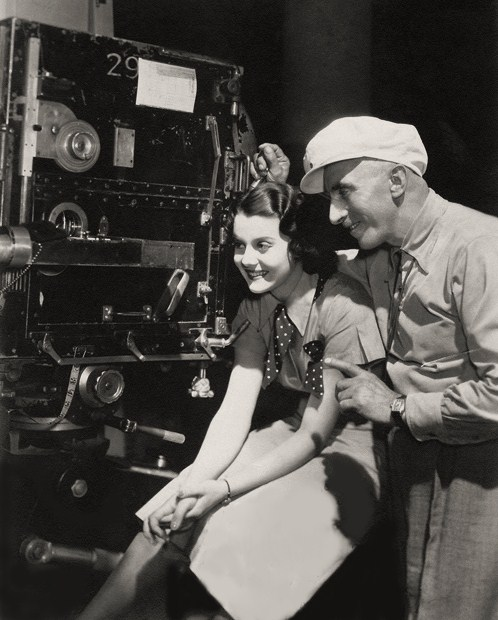
Bradna with director James P. Hogan on the set of The Last Train from Madrid (1937).

Bradna started her film career in France, then, in 1934, moved to Hollywood, California where she saw her greatest success, signing a seven-year contract with Paramount Pictures. In 1935, she was one of seven young women "named by Paramount ... as possible screen stars of the future." She was one of six newcomers selected by Paramount in December 1935 to appear in a planned musical. Her screen debut came in Three Cheers for Love (1936). In 1936, she appeared in College Holiday. Later, branching out from musicals to more serious films, she had roles in The Last Train from Madrid and Souls at Sea.

During her career she appeared in more than a dozen films and was seen opposite such notable film stars as Ronald Reagan, George Raft and Gary Cooper.

== Early retirement, later years ==
In May, 1941 Olympe married Douglas Woods Wilhoit, at which point she retired from acting. For many years she and her family lived in Stockton, California, before ultimately settling in Lodi, California. Together, she and Douglas would have four children, five grandchildren and eight great-grandchildren. They were married for over seventy years, with Douglas passing away in February, 2012, just nine months prior to Olympe's death.

== Death ==
Bradna died 5 November 2012, in Stockton, California, at age 92. (Another source says, "... Bradna died at her home in San Joaquin, California ...) She was survived by a son, two daughters, five grandchildren, and eight great-grandchildren.

== Filmography ==
Year	Title	Role	Notes
1933	Roger la Honte	Suzanne Laroque	
1934	Flofloche	Reine	
1936	Three Cheers for Love	Frenchy	
1936	College Holiday	Felice L'Hommedieu	
1937	The Last Train from Madrid	Maria Ronda	
1937	High, Wide, and Handsome		
1937	Souls at Sea	Babsie	
1938	Stolen Heaven	Steffi	
1938	Say It in French	Julie	
1939	The Night of Nights	Marie Alyce O'Farrell	
1940	South of Pago Pago	Malia	
1941	Knockout	Angela Grinnelli	
1941	Highway West	Myra Abbott	
1941	International Squadron	Jeanette	(final film role)
