= Koringa =

French circus artist (1913–1976)

Renée Bernard, known as Koringa (1913–1976) was a French circus performer and snake charmer. She was billed as the "Only Female Fakir in the World" and "the only female yogi".

== Early life ==
Renée Bernard was born in Bordeaux, France, in 1913. She was five feet tall and of French Indochina ancestry. However, her promotional materials claimed that Koringa was born in Rajisthan, India, having been orphaned at the age of three and raised by fakirs who had taught her their skills. One English reporter wrote that she only spoke Spanish and German.

== Career ==
Cyril Bertram Mills of the Bertram Mills Circus discovered and recruited Bernard in 1937 when she was performing an act involving climbing barefoot up a ladder made of swords for a small French circus. Her act also included dancing on razor blades and hot coals.

Mills and Bernard came up with the name Koringa and fabricated an Indian backstory for her. She was billed as "The Only Female Fakir in the World". This stage persona gave her a cultural identity that was popular with British and French audiences in the time.

Her acts included four female assistants in Eastern-style costumes, five crocodiles, two pythons, two boa constrictors, and having a concrete block broken on her stomach. Koringa act sometimes including pushing pins and needles into her skin and hanging by her throat from the sharp edge of a sword. She would also enter a state of self-hypnosis and, then, was placed on the sharp edge of two metal plates; a reporter noted that the plates were sharp enough to cut paper and sharpen a pencil. In a variation of this act, she lay across the sharp edge of swords; then, a large stone was placed on her and broken with a hammer.

Her signature act was hypnotizing the eight-foot-long crocodile named Churchill and standing on his head while wearing several snakes around her neck.Her act concluded with her being buried alive for five minutes in a sand pit filled with snakes or in a coffin filled and covered with sand. In another variation of her act, she dressed as a female Tarzan, with a leopard print costume.

In 1937, she was featured on the cover of Look magazine. By 1938, she was the leading act for Mills Brothers. On 8 July 1938, Koringa and one of her crocodiles visited Fenwicks department store in Newcastle upon Tyne at the invitation of Arthur Fenwick, one of the directors and a circus enthusiast. By November 1939, it was believed that Koringa earned more than the British prime minister.

By 1942, Koringa had left the Mills Circus and was headlining with a vaudeville tour.. In February 1942, she lost control of her largest crocodile and it dived into the orchestra pit at the Palace in Preston. Despite the scattering of the musicians and damage to instruments, Koringa regained control of the reptile and continued her act. The next night, one of her smaller crocodiles bit her chest, below her shoulder. She continued the performance but was unable to complete her show the next night because of the injury which required six stitches. However, a reviewer in The Guardian noted, that her act "belongs to the circus rather than vaudeville."

She also appeared as the headline act in other circuses, including Tower Circus in Blackpool, Cirque Pinder in France, and Boswell Wilkie Circus in South Africa. In July 1955, Koringa was bitten by one of her crocodiles while working as an animal tamer on the film An Alligator Named Daisy at Pinewood Studios, requiring her to be hospitalized. She stopped touring in 1960 but continued to perform in France. She retired in 1968.

== Free French Forces ==
During World War II, Koringa joined the Free French Forces, participating in secret missions.

== Fictional and theatrical representations and exhibitions ==
Koringa was one of the artists featured in a 2018 exhibition Circus! Show of Shows at the Weston Park Museum, Sheffield.

South African writer Finuala Dowling's 2022 novel The Man Who Loved Crocodile Tamers has Koringa as a central character. Koringa is one of the female artists featured in Marisa Carnesky's 2022 production Showwomen.
