= Chocolat (clown) =

Clown of Afro-Cuban descent

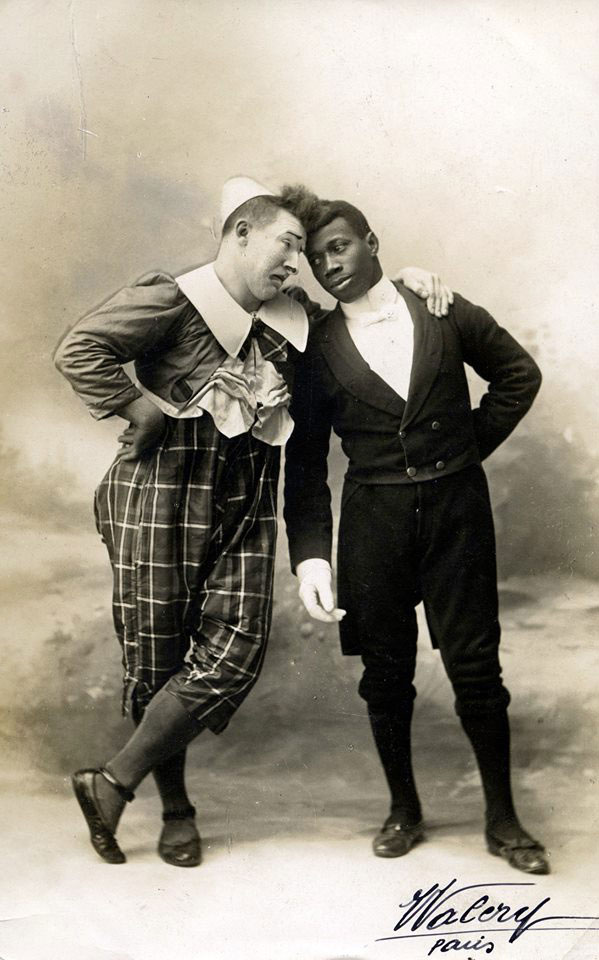
- Chocolat Clown (right) and his long-time partner George Foottit (left)
- Born: c. 1865; Cuba, Spanish Empire
- Died: 4 November 1917 (age 49); Bordeaux, France
- Other name: Rafael Padilla
- Occupation: Clown

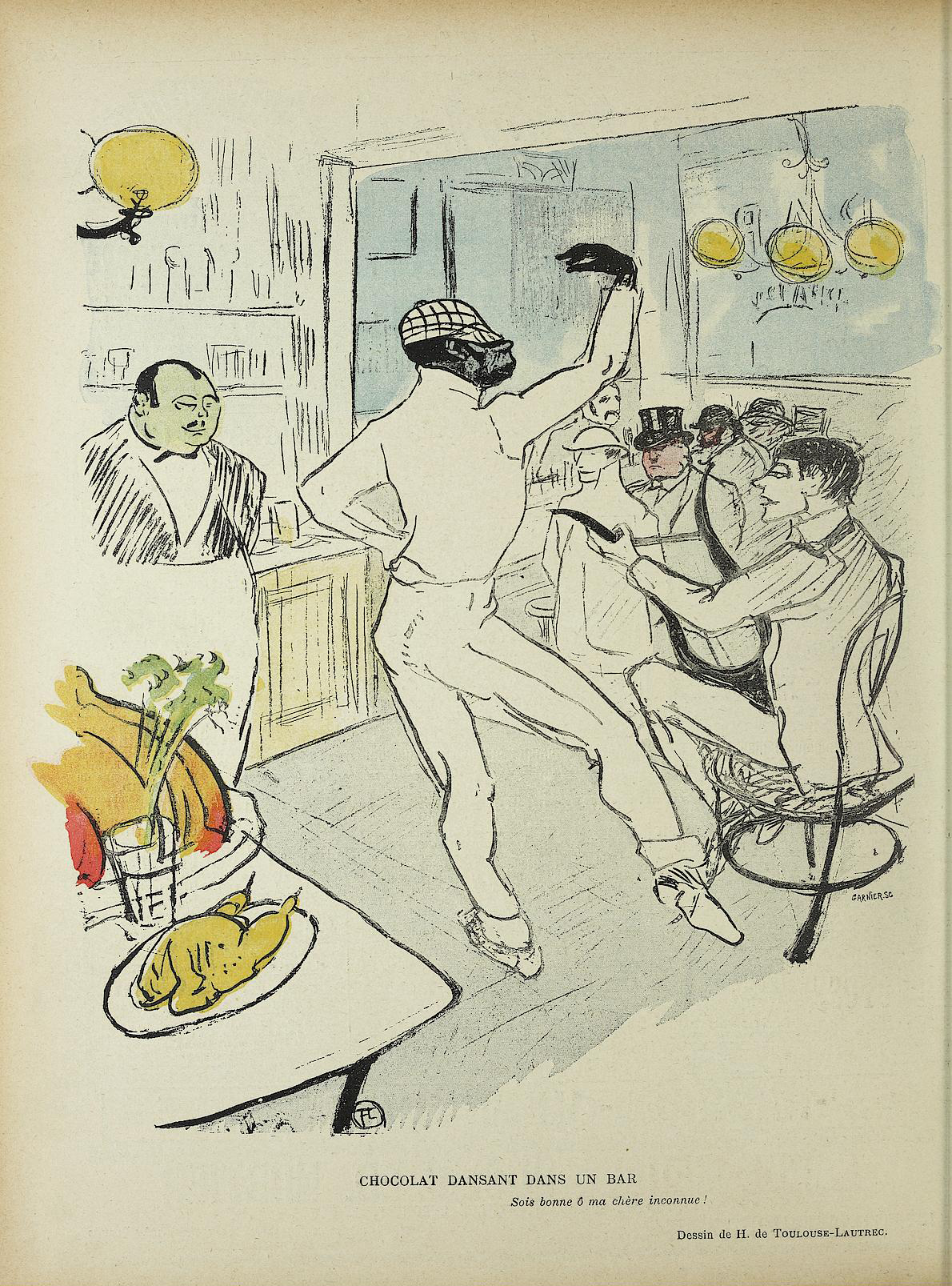
Chocolat dancing in a bar, lithography by Henri de Toulouse-Lautrec, 1896.

Rafael Padilla (ca. 1865/68 – 4 November 1917), known professionally as Chocolat, was a clown who performed in a Paris circus around the 1900s. Rafael was of Afro-Cuban descent and was one of the earliest successful black entertainers in modern France. He was the first black clown to play a lead role in a circus pantomime act, and with his longtime partner George Foottit, they revolutionized the art of clowning by pairing the sophisticated white clown with the foolish auguste clown.

== Early life ==
Rafael Padilla (sometimes Francized as Raphaël Padilla) was born sometime 1865 in Cuba, in Havana. He was born without a surname. According to historian Gérard Noiriel, "Padilla" may have the matronymic of his former Spanish master's wife. His parents were slaves in a Cuban plantation from which they escaped in 1878, leaving their son to a poor black woman who raised him in the slums of Havana. When Rafael was still a boy, she sold him to a Spanish businessman named Patricio Castaño Capetillo for 18 ounces of gold.

Castaño brought Rafael to his family's household in the village of Sopuerta in northern Spain. Cuba had banned the slave trade in 1862, and under international law Rafael technically ceased to be a slave at all the moment he set foot on European soil, but nonetheless the Castaños treated him like one. The Castaños, like many Spaniards with colonial connections, were anti-abolitionists and flouted the law by declaring Rafael a "servant". Rafael was the only black person in the village, and was mistreated both by the Castaños and the villagers. They made him sleep in the stables, and gave him no education.

At around the age of 14 or 15, Rafael fled the Castaños. He worked in the quarries of the Basque Country, then moved to Bilbao where he worked odd jobs, such as dockworker, then as a porter at the train station. In Bilbao he met Tony Grice, a travelling English clown, who hired him as an assistant and domestic servant. Grice would occasionally incorporate Rafael into his acts, such as in his parodies of American minstrel shows, but didn't make Rafael an apprentice. Rafael did not enjoy this life: on several occasions he deserted Grice, then returned when he could not find employment elsewhere.

== Debut ==
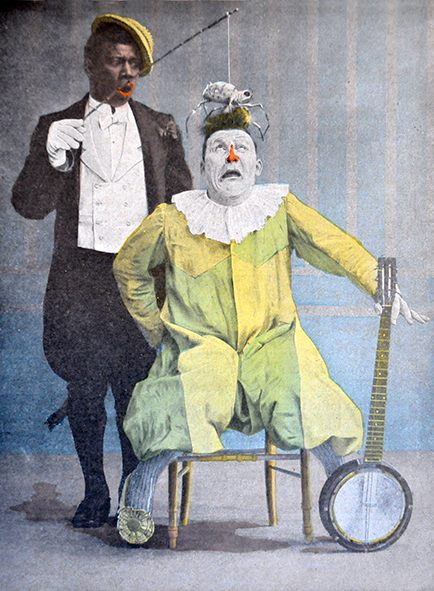
The duo of Foottit and Chocolat performing in the skit "Spider". A colour illustration by René Vincent, c. 1900.

The famous Auguste Tony Grice discovered Rafael working the docks of Bilbao, impressed by both his physical strength and his dancing. He hired him as his manservant and handyman and then made him his partner in some of his numbers, in which Rafael would act as a stuntman.

The new duo would go on to public notoriety when they began performing with the Nouveau Cirque of Joseph Oller in Paris during October 1886. Rafael's stage name of Chocolat was given to him at this time by Grice. In 1888, their partnership was ended when Henri Agoust, the manager of the Nouveau Cirque, hired Chocolat as the star of a nautical pantomime. He saw Chocolat as a potential star dancer and mime, and was proven correct when his first show, "The Wedding of Chocolat" was a huge success.

The show grew over the next five years, including teaming up with the clowns Pierantoni, Kestern and Geronimo Medrano. During this period he met the love of his life, Marie Hecquet, married to the Corsican Enrico Grimaldi. In 1895, Grimaldi filed for divorce, accusing his wife of adultery and abandoning the marital roof. Rafael and Marie started living together and became one of the first mixed couples in French history. However, they could never legally marry, because Marie was divorced and because Rafael had no civil status: he remained undocumented, and without a surname, until his death. Today, historians think that the two children Eugène and Suzanne, although bearing the surname Grimaldi, were actually Rafael's children. In any case, they were adopted by the circus community as "Chocolat fils" and "petite Chocolat", while Marie Hecquet was nicknamed "Madame Chocolat". After Rafael's death, Marie asked to be buried as "Veuve Chocolat", but an anonymous official removed this wording, preferring 'Divorcee Grimaldi'.

== Foottit and Chocolat ==
In 1895, Raoul Donval, director of the Nouveau Cirque, formed a new duo, teaming Chocolat with a British clown, George Foottit. The two performed together for twenty years, popularizing clown comedy, especially with the burlesque sketch William Tell.

This comedy relied heavily on "comedic slaps", making Chocolat a character consistent with the imagery and prejudices of that time; a character that gradually becomes the stereotype of the Negro scapegoat: silly, childish and friendly. Chocolat, however, fought the stereotype by constantly diversifying his skills and careful observation of the skits shows a character not confined to the roles of the subject. The phrase "je suis Chocolat", meaning "I am deceived", was popularized by the dialogues in their sketches, introduced by the duo in 1901. In 1905, their Nouveau Cirque contract was not renewed. Some blamed the Dreyfus affair and politicization of racial issues. There were also questions at the time of black and Mestizo politicians representing the old colonies of the French empire. Their joint career reached its peak with the Folies Bergère until they were considered old fashioned with the arrival of a generation of American black artists bringing the cake walk to the stages of Europe.

In 1909, they returned to the Nouveau Cirque with Chocolat, aviateur by Henry Moreau. The first performance on 30 October was well received by the public. On 19 November, in an article by writer and journalist Pierre Mille, Le Temps erroneously announced the death of Chocolat. The next day, Le Temps retracted the error and published a letter from Rafael, curiously dated 17 November:

Sir,

The director read in your newspaper that Mr. Mille, the intelligent journalist wrote that I am dead like Augustus.
I pray you, say that I am alive, and that I am playing every night in Chocolat aviateur at the Nouveau Cirque.
You can judge that I did not even turn white.
Please accept my respect,
Chocolat

Please correct it, because it hurts me.

Foottit and Chocolat split up in 1910, when Andre Antoine, director of the Odeon, hired Foottit to play the role of the Clown in Romeo and Juliet. They announced their separation on stage:

Foottit: "I go to play Romeo at the Odeon!"

Chocolat: "So? I'm playing Othello at the Comédie-Française!"

== Later life ==
In 1911 he performed at the Cirque de Paris in the Revue burlesque, created by Foottit and in 1912 Tablette et Chocolat with his adoptive son Eugène Grimaldi, but he suffered a breakdown after the death of his 19-year-old daughter caused by tuberculosis. Padilla died on 4 November 1917 during a tour of the Cirque Raincy in Bordeaux. His body rests at the Protestant cemetery in Bordeaux.

== In film ==
Chocolat and Foottit - Chaise en bascule.

Auguste and Louis Lumière filmed six skits of the duo Foottit and Chocolat (Boxers, Acrobats on the chair, Tip over chair (Chaise en bascule), Guillaume Tell, The policeman and The death of Chocolat. Guillaume Tell was also filmed by Émile Reynaud in 1896 and by Paul Decauville, with Stilts entrance, for the Phono-Cinéma-Théâtre using a phonograph.

Rupert John played a scene as Chocolat in the American 1952 film Moulin Rouge. Omar Sy played Chocolat in the 2016 French biopic Chocolat, loosely based on the clown's life.

== In advertising ==
Alone or with Foottit, Chocolat made advertising posters for Le Bon Marché, the chocolate Félix Potin, the soap La Hêve, and the tyres Michelin.
