= The Night of Nights =

1939 film by Lewis Milestone

- Directed by: Lewis Milestone
- Written by: Donald Ogden Stewart
- Produced by: George M. Arthur
- Starring: Pat O'Brien; Olympe Bradna; Roland Young; Reginald Gardiner; George E. Stone
- Cinematography: Leo Tover
- Edited by: Doane Harrison; Hugh Bennett
- Music by: Victor Young
- Production company: Paramount Pictures
- Distributed by: Paramount Pictures (1939 Theatrical); MCA/Universal Pictures (1958 Television)
- Release date: December 1, 1939 (U.S.)
- Running time: 86 minutes
- Country: United States
- Language: English

The Night of Nights is a 1939 black-and-white drama film written by Donald Ogden Stewart and directed by Lewis Milestone for Paramount Pictures that starred Pat O'Brien, Olympe Bradna, and Roland Young.

The film received positive contemporary reviews from publications such as The New York Times. Director Milestone went on to other successful productions after the film came out, including Ocean's 11 and Pork Chop Hill.

== Plot ==
Dan O'Farrell is a brilliant Broadway theater playwright, actor, and producer who has left the business. When he was younger, he and his partner Barry Keith-Trimble were preparing for the opening night of O'Farell's play Laughter by getting drunk. When it was time to perform, they were so intoxicated they ended up brawling on stage and fell into the orchestra pit. The two left the theater and continued drinking, until they learn that they have been suspended. At the same time, O'Farrell learns that his wife, actress Alyce Martelle, is pregnant and has left him for ruining her performance in Laughter as Toni. Despondent, he in left the business and went into seclusion.

Years later, his daughter Marie locates him and inspires him to return to Broadway. He decides to restage Laughter with its original cast, but with Marie substituting for Alyce in the part of Toni. Hoping to make a glorious return with a show that would be a hit with critics and the public alike, O'Farrell enlists the aid of friends to embark on a full-fledged comeback.

== Cast ==
- Pat O'Brien as Dan O'Farrell
- Olympe Bradna as Marie Alyce O'Farrell
- Roland Young as Barry Keith-Trimble
- Reginald Gardiner as J. Neville Prime
- George E. Stone as Sammy Kayn
- Murray Alper as Muggins
- Richard Denning as Call Boy
- Mary Gordon as Pencil Woman
- Ethan Laidlaw as Roustabout in Play
- Frank Melton as Newcomb
- Charles Miller as Wilton
- D'Arcy Corrigan as Actor
- Pat O'Malley as Actor
- Kenneth Harlan as Actor
- Oscar O'Shea as Mr. Conway
- Russ Powell as Pop
- Aileen Pringle as Perfume
- Frank Shannon as Frank
- Wyndham Standing as Naval Commander
- Gene Clark as Acrobat
- James Fawcett as Acrobat
- Baldwin Cooke as Waiter
- Tom Dugan as Bartender
- Joe Gilbert as Attendant
- Carol Holloway as Maid

== Reception ==
Frank S. Nugent wrote for The New York Times that the work of actors Pat O'Brien and Roland Young, had "been a labor of love and the film has profited accordingly." In noting that the plot centered on "the theatre and some of the curious folk who inhabit it", the newspaper's review stated that the film had an acceptable sentimentality and shared that the story was "an uncommonly interesting study of a man's mind, subtly written and directed, presented with honesty and commendable sincerity by Mr. O'Brien, Mr. Young and Olympe Bradna, and well worth any one's attention." The only objection in the review was that the stage play Laughter, the piece being produced within the film by O'Brien's character of Dan O'Farrell, "seemed to be the most awful tripe."
