= Stolen Heaven (1938 film) =

1938 film by Andrew L. Stone

- Theatrical release poster
- Directed by: Andrew L. Stone
- Written by: Eve Greene; Frederick J. Jackson; Andrew L. Stone
- Starring: Gene Raymond; Olympe Bradna; Glenda Farrell
- Cinematography: William C. Mellor
- Edited by: Doane Harrison
- Music by: Manning Sherwin (music); Frank Loesser (lyrics); Ralph Rainger (music); Richard A. Whiting (music); Leo Robin (lyrics)
- Production company: Paramount Pictures
- Distributed by: Paramount Pictures
- Release date: May 13, 1938
- Running time: 88 minutes
- Country: United States
- Language: English

Stolen Heaven is a 1938 American drama film directed by Andrew L. Stone and written by Eve Greene, Frederick J. Jackson and Stone. The film stars Gene Raymond, Olympe Bradna and Glenda Farrell. The film was released on May 13, 1938, by Paramount Pictures. The screenplay concerns two jewel thieves who pose as musicians to elude pursuing law officers.

== Plot ==
The film has been called a "musical melodrama". A female jewel thief named Steffi, a.k.a. "Will O'the Wisp", robs a jewelry store with her partners Von, Rita and Bako. The thieves pose as musicians to throw the police off their trail.

== Cast ==
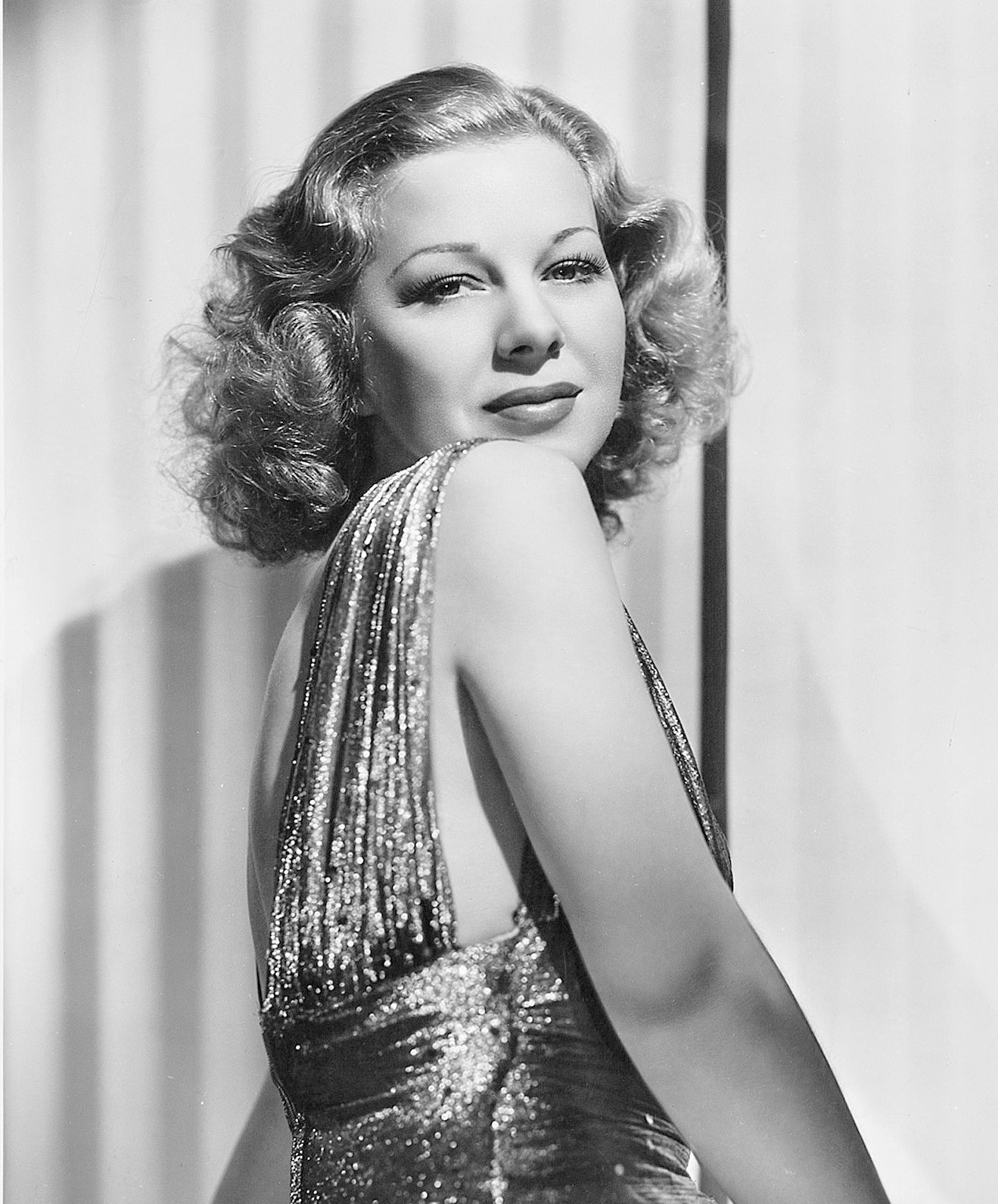
Glenda Farrell in Stolen Heaven

- Gene Raymond as Carl Lieberlich
- Olympe Bradna as Steffi
- Glenda Farrell as Rita
- Lewis Stone as Joseph Langauer
- Porter Hall as Hermann "Von" Offer
- Douglass Dumbrille as Klingman
- Joe Sawyer as Bako
- Esther Dale as Lieschen
- Charles Judels as Huberl
- Ferdinand Gottschalk as Lubert
