= Cha-U-Kao =

French entertainer

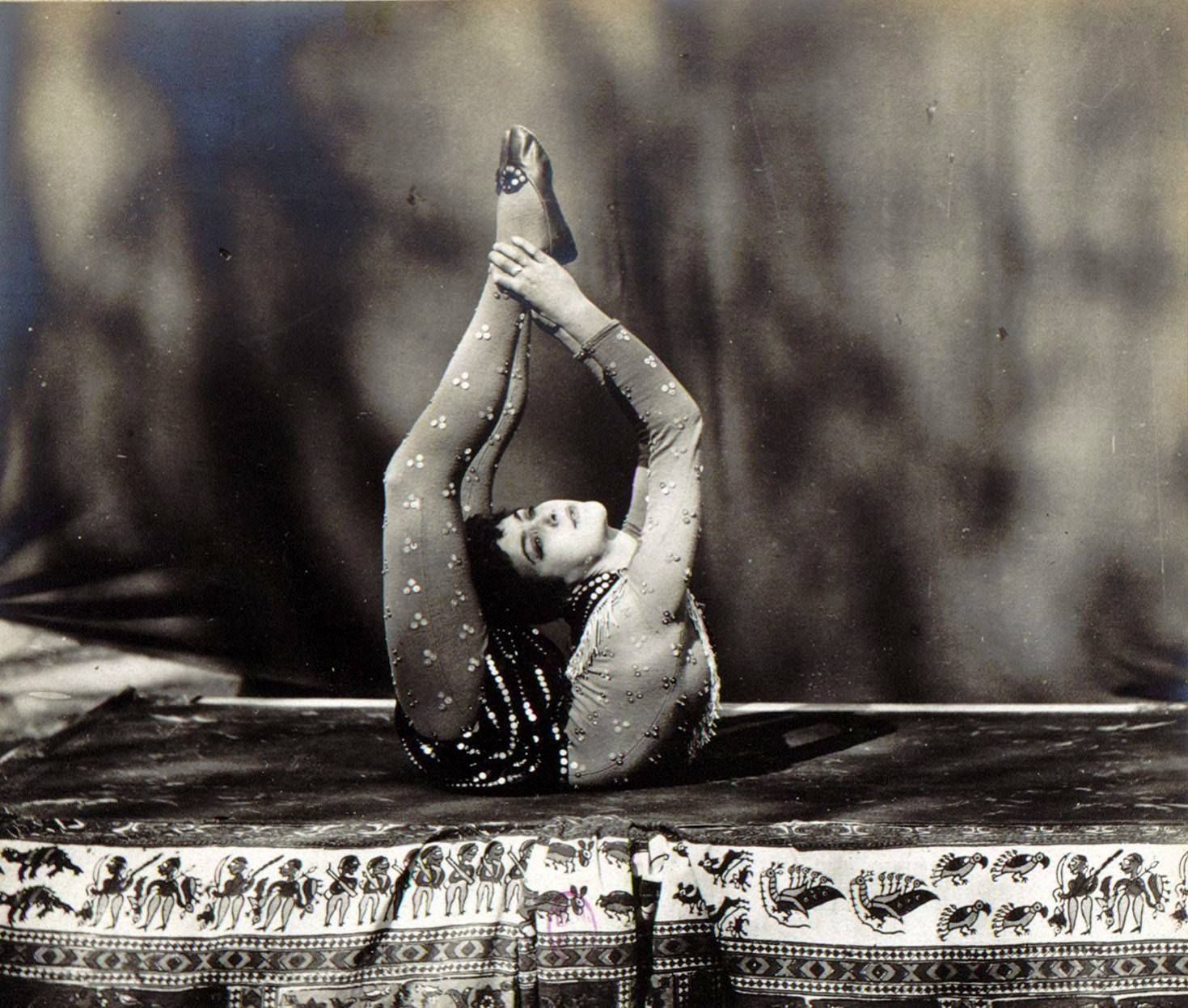
- Cha-U-Kao by Maurice Guibert (1890)
- Other name: The Clowness
- Occupations: dancer, acrobat, clown

Cha-U-Kao was a French entertainer who performed at the Moulin Rouge and the Nouveau Cirque in the 1890s. Her stage name was also the name of a boisterous popular dance, similar to the can-can, which came from the French words "chahut", meaning "noise" and "chaos". She was depicted in a series of paintings by Henri de Toulouse-Lautrec. Cha-U-Kao soon became one of his favorite models. The artist was fascinated by this woman who dared to choose the classic male profession of clowning and was not afraid to openly declare that she was a lesbian.

Little is known about her life, including her real name, though she was a gymnast before she worked as a Parisian female clown or "clownesse." During her time as a gymnast, Maurice Guilbert photographed her, capturing her younger self that contrasted with Toulouse-Lautrec's later depictions. Her clown performances included a "distinctive black-and-yellow costume with her hair piled up on her head[.]"

Toulouse-Lautrec sometimes sketched Cha-u-Kao with her partner, and these sketches would be included in his portfolio Elles. It is believed that her partner was Gabrielle the Dancer, another performer and model for Toulouse-Lautrec. In 1979, art historian Naomi Maurer identified Cha-U-Kao in the artist's work as part of an exhibit at the Art Institute of Chicago. (The exhibit ran in the fall of that year.)

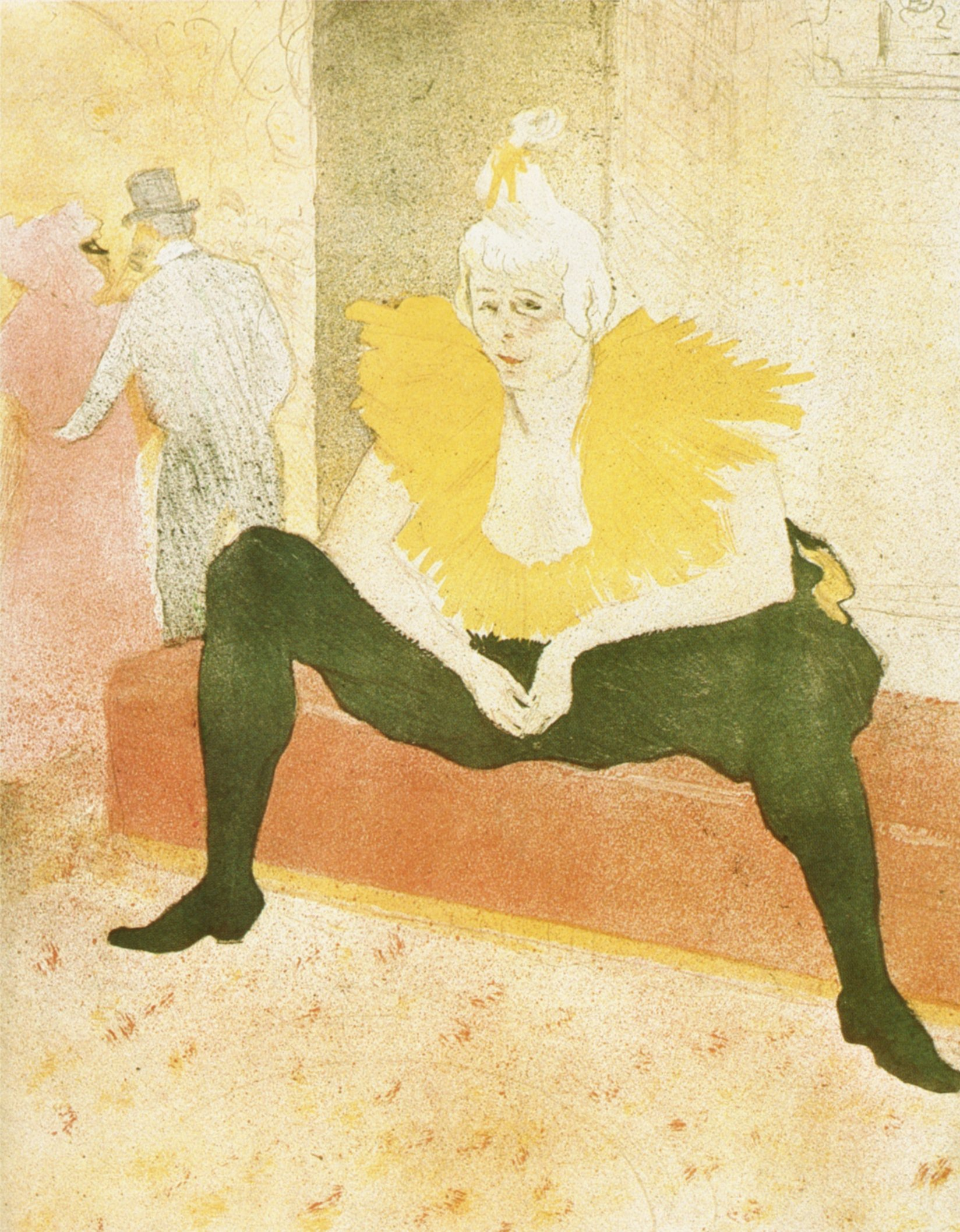
The Seated Clowness by Henri de Toulouse-Lautrec

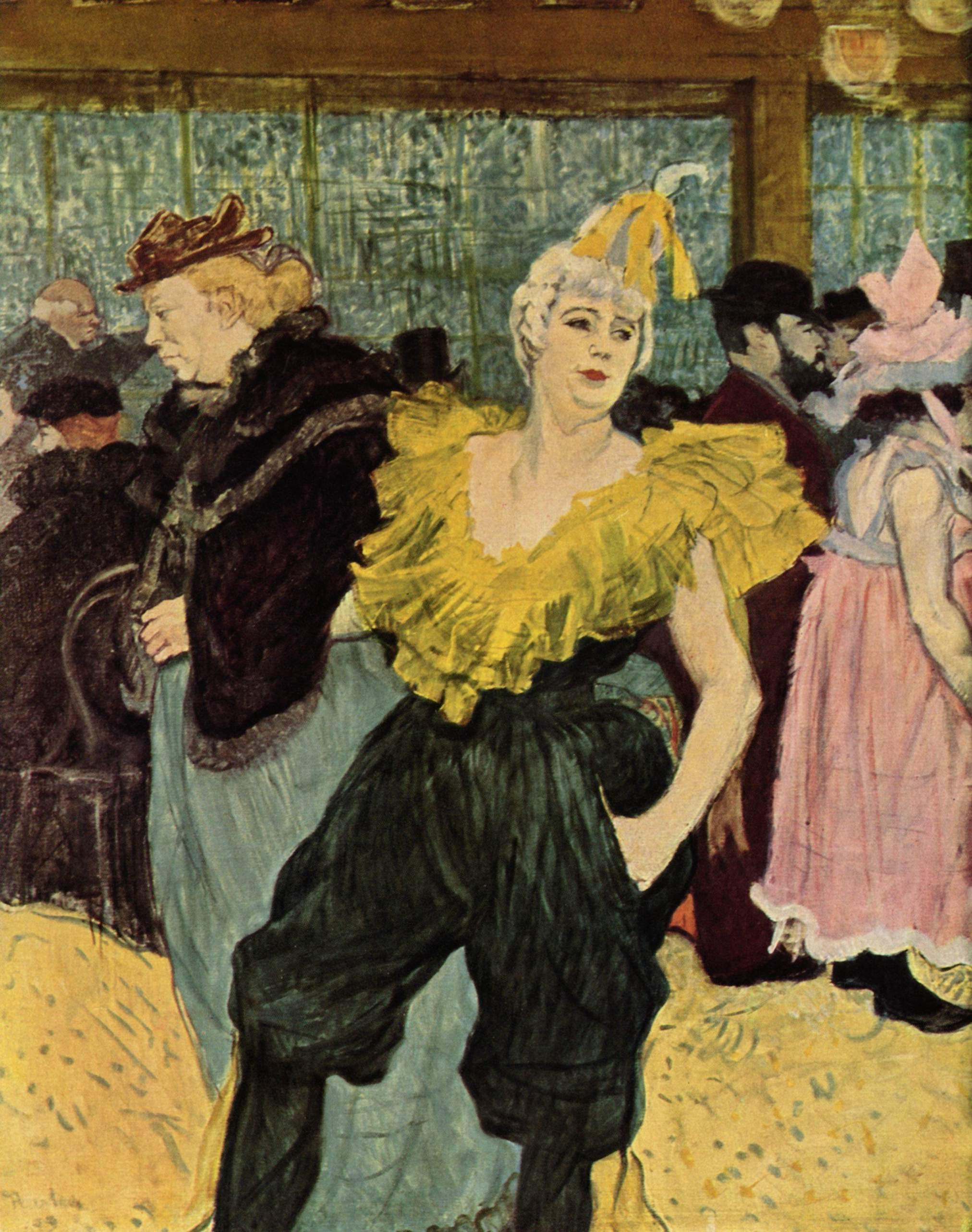
La Clownesse Cha-U-Ka-O im Moulin Rouge

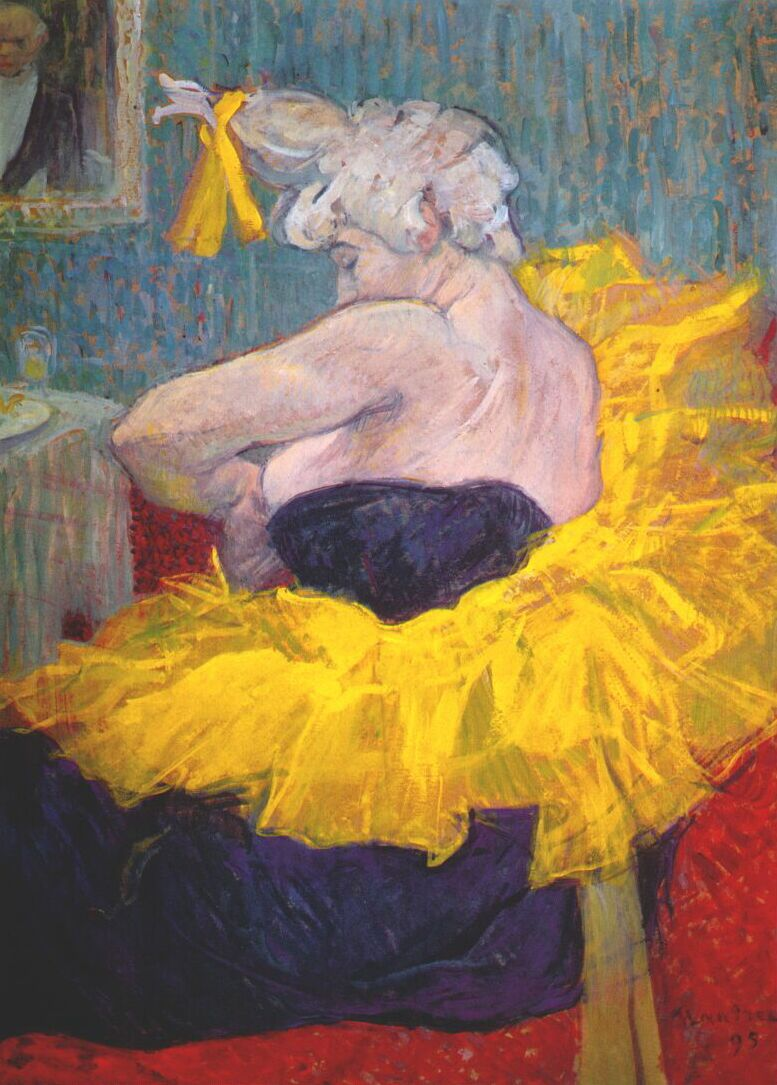
The clownesse cha-u-kao at the Moulin Rouge

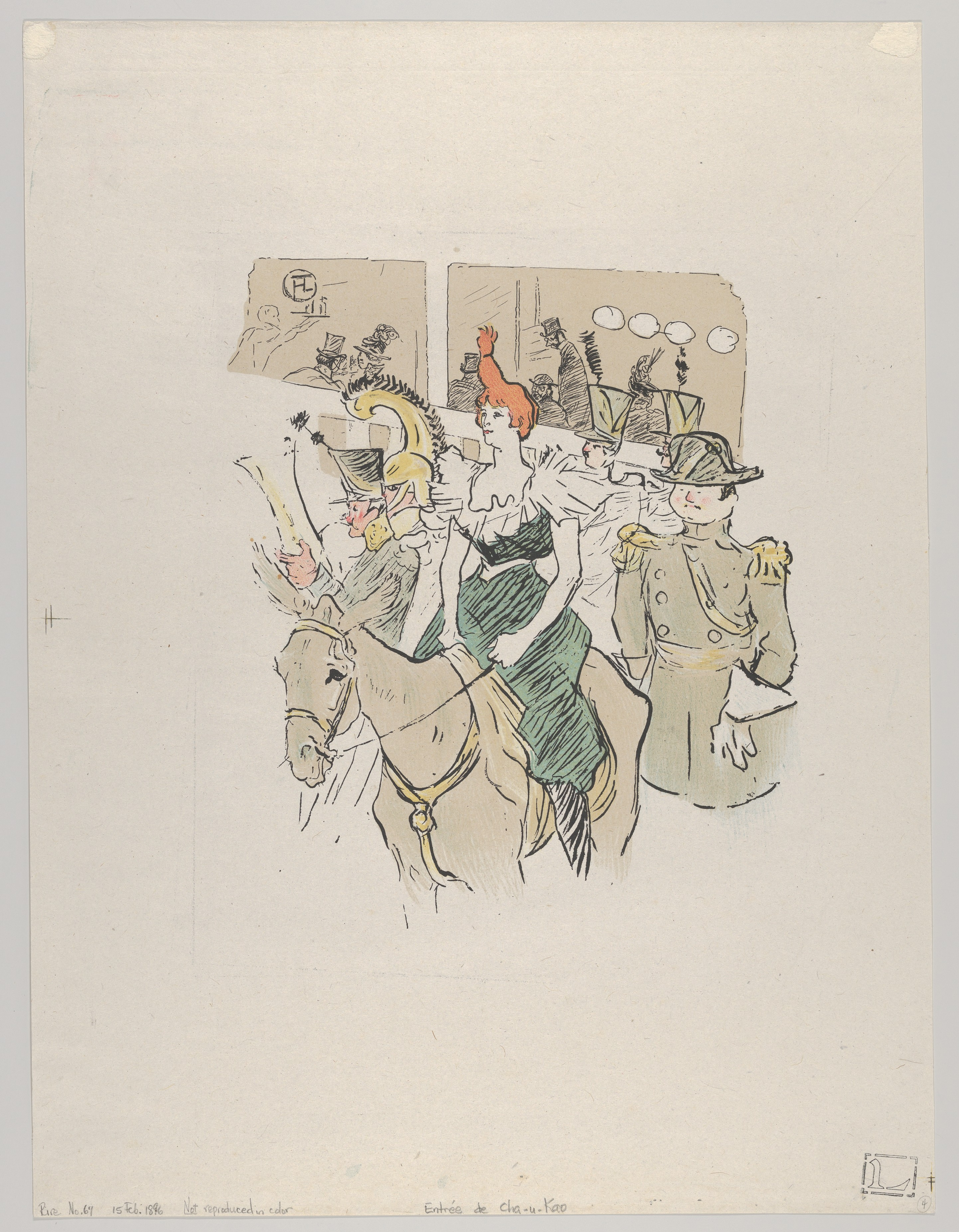
Entrée de Cha-u-Kao, from Le Rire, No. 67, 15 February 1896

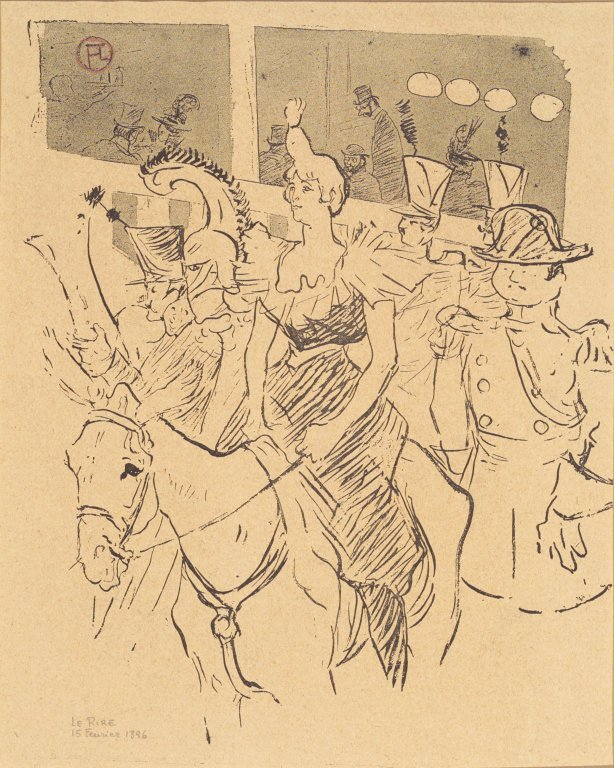
Entree de Cha-U-Kao

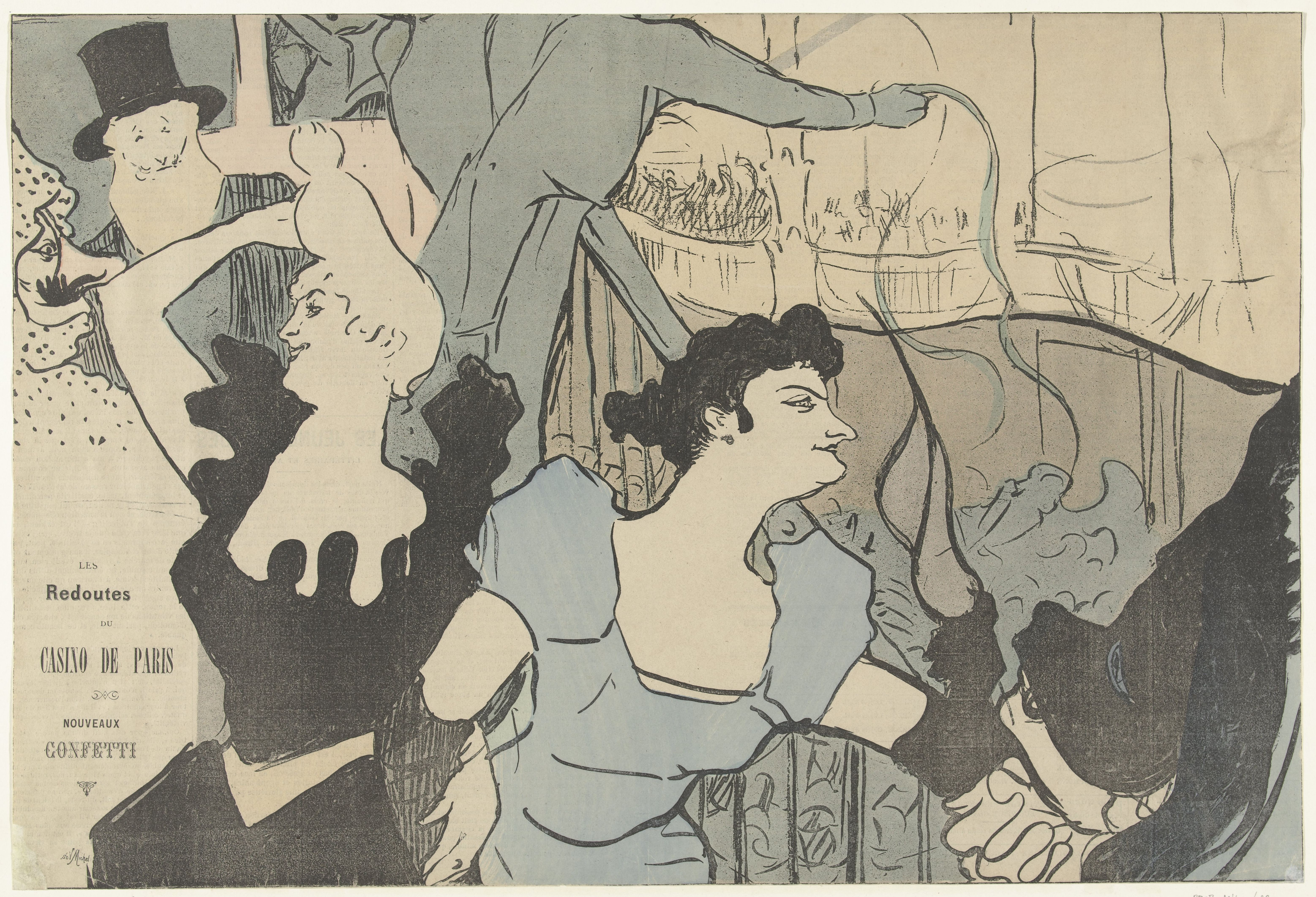
Poster for masked ball in Paris Casino with portraits of Cha-u-kao and Yvette Guilbert Les Redoutes du Casino de Paris
