= Knockout (1941 film) =

1941 film by William Clemens

- Theatrical release poster
- Directed by: William Clemens
- Screenplay by: M. Coates Webster
- Story by: Michael Fessier
- Produced by: Bryan Foy
- Starring: Arthur Kennedy; Olympe Bradna; Virginia Field; Anthony Quinn; Cliff Edwards; Cornel Wilde
- Cinematography: Ted D. McCord
- Edited by: Doug Gould
- Music by: Howard Jackson
- Production company: Warner Bros. Pictures
- Distributed by: Warner Bros. Pictures
- Release date: March 29, 1941
- Running time: 73 minutes
- Country: United States
- Language: English

Knockout is a 1941 American sports drama film directed by William Clemens and written by M. Coates Webster. The film stars Arthur Kennedy, Olympe Bradna, Virginia Field, Anthony Quinn, Cliff Edwards and Cornel Wilde. The film was released by Warner Bros. Pictures on March 29, 1941.

== Plot ==
Johnny Rocket is an up-and-comer in the boxing game, but promoter Trego is unhappy at learning Johnny's planning to quit because that's what his fiancée Angela wants.

Trego uses his connections to make sure Johnny can't find a job. Now that wife Angela is expecting a baby, Johnny has no choice but to return to the ring. A newspaperwoman, Gloria Van Ness, tries to seduce Johnny, who resists at first. But as his record improves and his ego grows, Johnny begins to return Gloria's interest and loses Angela in the process. He also fires Trego, feeling he doesn't need anybody's help anymore.

A drugged mouthpiece, planted by Trego, causes Johnny to lose his next fight and give the appearance of taking a dive. He is suspended from boxing. When he tries to fight under an assumed name, he is knocked cold. Johnny comes to his senses in more ways than one when he learns that Angela has been paying his hospital bills. They are reunited, and Johnny quits boxing to go work at a children's summer camp.

== Cast ==
- Arthur Kennedy as Johnny Rocket
- Olympe Bradna as Angela Grinnelli
- Virginia Field as Gloria Van Ness
- Anthony Quinn as Trego
- Cliff Edwards as Pinky
- Cornel Wilde as Tom Rossi
- Richard Ainley as Allison
- William Edmunds as Louis Grinnelli
- Frank Wilcox as Denning
- John Ridgely as Pat Martin
- Ben Welden as Pelky
- Charles C. Wilson as Monigan
- Edwin Stanley as Doctor
