= International Squadron (film) =

1941 film by Lewis Seiler, Lothar Mendes

- Original film poster
- Directed by: Lewis Seiler; Lothar Mendes
- Written by: Kenneth Gamet; Barry Trivers
- Based on: Ceiling Zero (novel) by Frank Wead
- Produced by: Hal Wallis; Edmund Grainger
- Starring: Ronald Reagan; Olympe Bradna; James Stephenson
- Cinematography: Ted McCord; James Van Trees
- Edited by: Frank Magee
- Music by: William Lava
- Production company: Warner Bros. Pictures
- Distributed by: Warner Bros. Pictures
- Release date: August 13, 1941 (U.S.)
- Running time: 85 minutes
- Country: United States
- Language: English

International Squadron (aka Flight Patrol) is a 1941 American war film directed by Lewis Seiler and Lothar Mendes that starred Ronald Reagan, Olympe Bradna and in his final film, James Stephenson. The film is based on the Eagle Squadrons, American pilots who volunteered to fly for the Royal Air Force during World War II. International Squadron featured noted Hollywood pilot Paul Mantz who acted as the film's aerial coordinator and flew during the production.

== Plot ==
Royal Air Force Squadron Leader Charles Wyatt (James Stephenson) asks his friend, Jimmy Grant (Ronald Reagan), a daredevil pilot on the airshow circuit, to join the RAF's International Squadron, made up of Americans. Jimmy turns him down, saying that he intends to stay safe at home. Faced with a breach-of-promise suit, Jimmy, however, is hired to deliver a new American-designed Lockheed Hudson bomber to the RAF, flying to England with his mechanic, "Omaha" McGrath (Cliff Edwards). When they encounter a heavy fog over the English base, Jimmy ignores a request from Charles to bail out, and brings the bomber in to a safe landing.

While in London, Jimmy meets up with an old friend, Rog Wilkins (William Lundigan) now serving in the International Squadron. Jeanette (Olympe Bradna), the young French woman assigned as his driver, he asks her out for dinner. A German raid hits the city. Jimmy is impressed by the courage of the embattled Londoners and moved by the death of a young child, to join the fight.

In the RAF, Jimmy is not able to fit in, and during an air patrol, while he shots down a German bomber, his reckless flying results in the death of an RAF comrade. The only thing that saves him from dismissal is the intervention of Charles. The next occasion when Jimmy can make amends ends badly as he wants to take Jeanette out, appealing to Rog to stand in for him. Despite being on call for 20 hours, Rog flies his patrol, and is shot down and killed.

In despair, Jimmy wants to quit but Charles persuades him to stay and avenge his friend's death. When Jeanette's boyfriend, Michele Edmé (Tod Andrews) is selected for a dangerous bombing mission over Nazi-held territory, Jimmy knocks him out and takes his place. Caught by enemy aircraft, Jimmy shoots two down, successfully completing his bombing run but is overwhelmed and shot down, crashing to his death. At his airbase, the International Squadron drinks a toast in tribute to him.

== Cast ==
- Ronald Reagan as Jimmy Grant
- Olympe Bradna as Jeanette
- James Stephenson as Squadron Leader Charles Wyatt
- William Lundigan as Lt. Rog Wilkins
- Joan Perry as Connie Wilkins
- Reginald Denny as Wing Commander Severn
- Cliff Edwards as Omaha McGrath
- Julie Bishop as Mary Wyatt
- Tod Andrews as Michele Edmé
- John Ridgely as Bill Torrence
- Charles Irwin as Biddle
- Addison Richards as Chief Engineer
- Selmer Jackson as Saunders
- Holmes Herbert as Sir Basil Wryxton
- Joan Perry as Connie Wilkins
- Ernie Stanton as Ground man (uncredited)

== Production ==
When American pilots went to war in the R.A.F. Eagle Squadrons, it set off a minor war between several of the Hollywood studios. Producer Walter Wanger had immediately copyrighted the name of "Eagle Squadron" for his film of the same name that appeared in early 1942. Producer Darryl F. Zanuck of 20th Century Fox wrote angry letters to Hal Wallis of Warner Bros. Pictures accusing them of not only stealing his idea of his A Yank in the R.A.F. but making a low budget B picture to beat Fox's prestigious production to the screen.

Zanuck threatened legal action unless Warners stopped the film from being made or not to release their film until 60 days after Zanuck's film was released. Warners ignored Zanuck as the Eagle Squadrons were a major news item of the day and Warners based their screenplay on a film made by the studio Ceiling Zero based on a play by Frank Wead. They did change the film's original title from Eagle Squadron to Flight Patrol then finally International Squadron and released it two months before A Yank in the R.A.F.

Warners acquired another boost by hiring Byron Kennerly, a former member of an Eagle Squadron as the film's technical advisor. Kennerly had written a magazine story Squadron 71, Scramble! A Day in the Eagle Squadron, R.A.F. that was published in the July 1941 issue of Harper's Magazine and was in the process of writing a book The Eagles Roar! that Warners bought the rights to. However, according to some sources Kennerly left the Eagle Squadron before their first engagement; with some sources saying he was on furlough for an ear ailment. Kennerly later served with the United States Army Air Forces and was jailed for bank robbery in February 1951.

Actual film of dogfighting between Spitfires and Messerschmitts and Heinkels and a London air raid were shot by Warners' Teddington studios technicians and shipped to the United States for inclusion in the film.

The modest budget for International Squadron necessitated the use of the Alhambra, California Municipal Airport standing in for an RAF base, and a bevy of contemporary civil aircraft standing in for the latest RAF fighters. The unlikely group included a Mantz's Boeing Model 100, Brown B-3 Racer, three Ryan STA trainers and a Travel Air Type R Mystery Ship.

== Reception ==
International Squadron was favorably reviewed by Theodore Strauss for The New York Times, who said: "As another aerial and romantic dog-fight in the hurtling succession of epics about the Royal Air Force, it breezes along with dash and bravado and not too much self-importance. Its emotional upheavals are tossed off with a wisecrack; it doesn't belabor its story with inspirational organ music, and it keeps its wheels well off the ground. No ace among war films, it is none the less a brisk, brash flier in pulse-quickening entertainment."

== See also ==
- A Yank in the R.A.F.
- Eagle Squadron
- Higher Than a Kite
