= Cirque Pinder =

French circus company (founded 1854)

- Logo 2026

Origin
- Country: France
- Founder(s): William and George Pinder
- Year founded: 1854 in the UK. Moved permanently to France in 1904

Information
- Operator(s): Pinder family, Charles Spiessert, Jean Richard, Edelstein family
- Fate: In operation (2026)
- Travelling show?: Yes
- Circus tent?: Yes

The Cirque Pinder is a French circus founded in 1854 in the United Kingdom. Originally named Cirque Britannia, it has changed hands several times throughout its history, being successively managed by the Pinder family, Charles Spiessert, Jean Richard, and, most recently, by the Edelstein family. The circus's mascot was an elephant, although it no longer has wild animals in its shows.

== History ==
The circus was founded by William and George Pinder in 1854. The brothers, who were specialists in equestrian arts but had no circus experience, named the travelling circus as the Britannia Circus after the ship whose sail had become the canvas of their big top. Significant competition from other circuses led the Pinders to relocate to Holland in the spring of 1868, visiting France for the first time in the same year, before returning to England. This was followed by another tour of England in 1869 and, at the end of the season, a return to France. This pattern became established, and the trips back and forth between England and France increased significantly before the circus settled permanently in France in 1904, under the direction of Arthur Pinder, son of William. The circus established its winter quarters in the small village of La Ville-Dieu-du-Temple in the Tarn-et-Garonne department.

Following the death of Arthur Pinder in 1924, an auction was held on 16 July 1928. Charles Spiessert, a descendant of Hungarian showmen, took over the circus, acquiring the big top, equipment and the animals. Spiessert modernized the circus and began offering high-quality shows. In 1932, he bought a property in Chanceaux-sur-Choisille, a small village near Tours, which allowed him to establish a base for the circus. After WWII, the Pinder Circus, under his direction, experienced its golden age, with increasingly spectacular shows, state-of-the-art road equipment, and increased exposure due to the support of the ORTF (French Radio and Television Broadcasting Office, 1964-75), with the circus becoming known as the "Pinder-ORTF" Circus. Spiessert ran the circus until his death in 1971. His children took over temporarily but the circus was sold at the end of 1971 to the actor Jean Richard.

From the beginning of 1972, Richard's name appeared on all the circus vehicles, with the circus becoming the "Pinder Jean Richard" Circus. In May 1973, Richard was involved in a serious car accident, and this marked the beginning of his financial difficulties. He was also the owner of an amusement park, two other circuses, and of the Nouvel Hippodrome de Paris. While recovering from the accident he struggled to manage all his businesses and continue his acting career. He filed for bankruptcy in 1978 and again a few years later.

Gilbert Edelstein, who came from a family of fabric merchants, originally a rock concert organizer in the 1960s, later opened a restaurant in Lyon, his hometown. It was there that he was introduced to Richard. Richard offered him a position in sales and advertising for the circus, a position he held for seven years before founding his own company, which was aimed at promoting the circus and, in particular, its merchandise to several other circuses. In June 1983, after Richard's second bankruptcy, Edelstein bought the assets of Richard's circuses, as well as the Jean Richard brand name, in the process saving 120 jobs. With the help of his wife, Andrée, he reorganized the Pinder circus, modernized its management, and hired big names in the circus world.

In just a few years, he built what became the leading traveling circus company in France and Europe. In 1994, he purchased a large property in Perthes-en-Gâtinais, south of Paris, comprising a château, a farmhouse, and 130 hectares of woodland, which served as his circus's base. He envisioned creating a circus-themed amusement park called "Pinderland," which was never achieved. His son, Frédéric, took over the management of the circus. His animal training act, featuring sixteen lions and tigers, was unique. He also presented a new group of big cats, composed solely of white lionesses and lions. Frédéric's sister, Sophie, served as the circus's artistic director.

== Recent difficulties ==
In 2010, the Pinder Circus was convicted by the Valence High Court and fined €6,000, for "unauthorized operation of an establishment keeping non-domestic animals", "unauthorized use of non-domestic animals", and "lack of certificates of competence". Two Asian elephants and a black jaguar were ordered to be confiscated. The Grenoble Court of Appeal increased the fine to €15,000, but did not order the confiscation of the animals. In 2011, the Circus again faced legal action following an inspection by the French National Hunting and Wildlife Agency (ONCFS), which found that the intra-Community certificates for six tigers had not been presented, making it impossible to prove their origin, and that there was a discrepancy between the actual number of tigers in the group and the official number recorded in the circus's register.

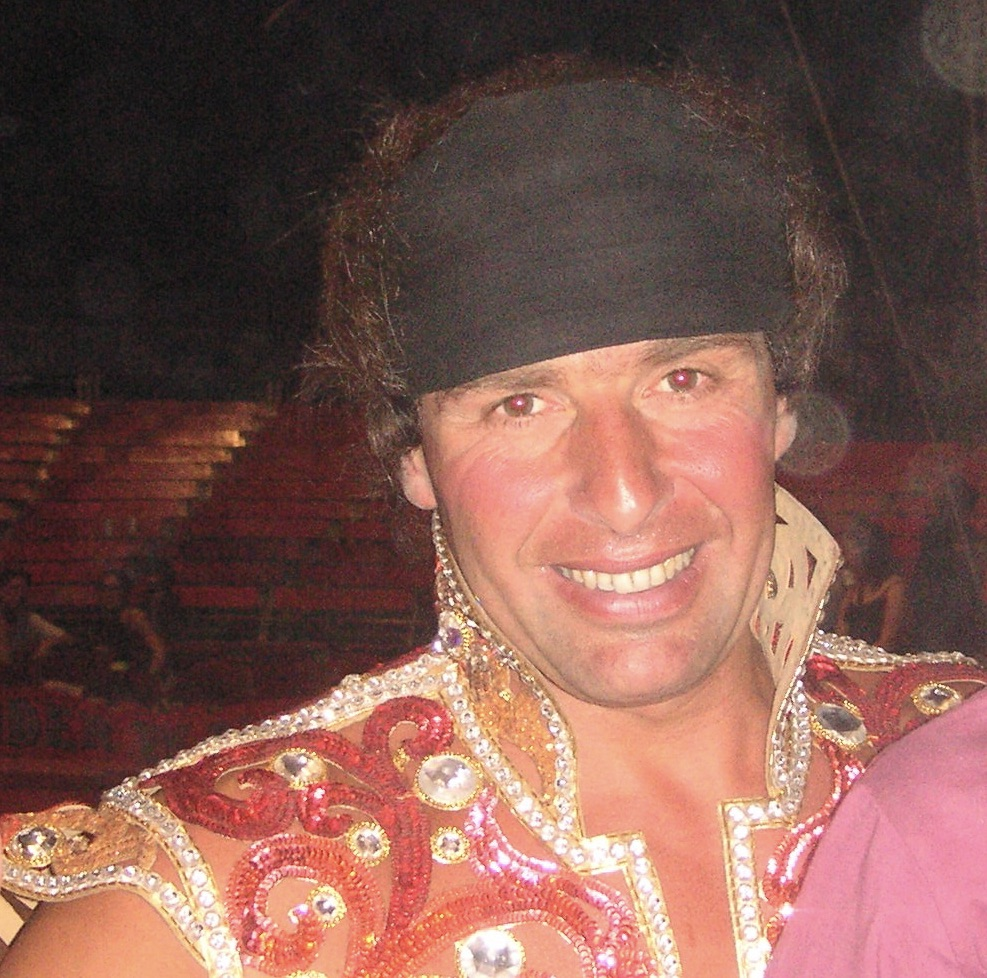
Frederic Edelstein in 2007

In 2016, the Pinder Circus faced its first major challenge when the La Ciotat city council issued a decree banning the use of wild animals in circuses. In 2021, circus animals were also banned in Paris and many other cities. In October 2021, a law was passed that would prohibit the use of big cats and elephants on tour by 2029. In response, Frédéric Edelstein made several media appearances to defend the presence of animals in the circus, which he considered essential for the show's success, both artistic and financial. On 2 May 2018, "Promogil", the company that operated the Pinder Circus, was placed into liquidation. Subsequent tours were cancelled, initially due to the circus's financial difficulties and later to the Covid-19 pandemic. Gilbert Edelstein died on 9 November 2022.

The circus returned at the end of 2023, without wild animals. Madame Andrée Edelstein decided to resume the tour with the help of her grandson, Alexandre Edelstein and other family members. A new 1600-seat big top was purchased. The circus offered a 1 hour 40 minute show with clowns, acrobats, a human cannonball, tightrope walking, contortionists, illusions, and other circus acts, as well as horses, continuing to move around France as did previous circuses of the same name. In the early 2000s, this had involved 20,000 km of travel per year, a 5-kilometre convoy, 140 vehicles, 25 trucks, and 38 caravans.

== Performers ==
Among those to manage and/or perform at the circus have been Guy des Cars, a novelist who at one time managed the circus, Annie Fratellini, a clown, Koringa, known as the "only female fakir in the world", the mentalist and illusionist, Léo Brière, the animal trainer, Alfred Court, and Fred Adison, who conducted the circus's orchestra for a decade.
