= George Foottit =

British clown and circus performer

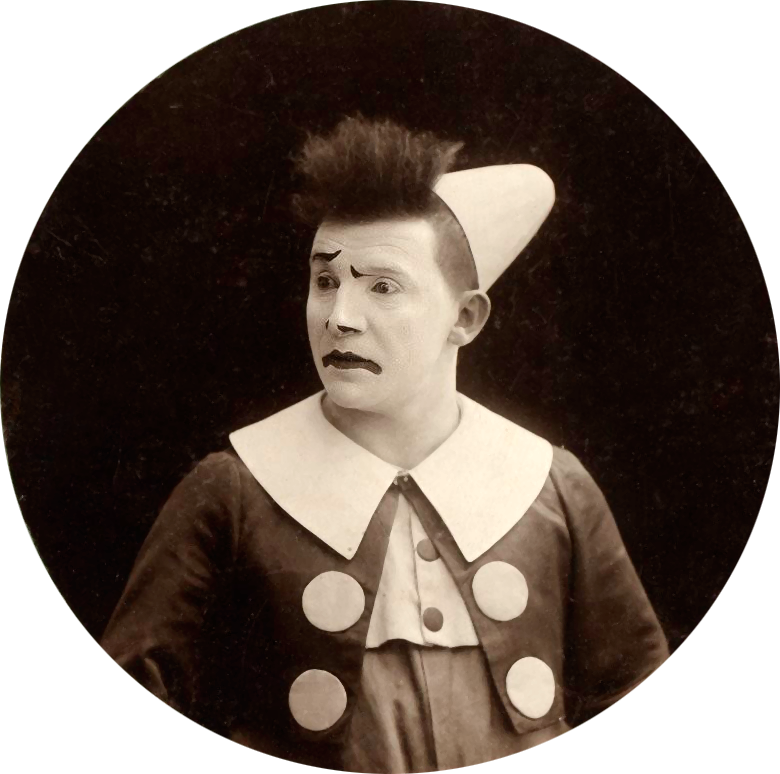
- Born: 24 April 1864; Manchester, England
- Died: 21 September 1921 (aged 57); Paris, France
- Occupation: Clown

George Foottit (1864 –1921) was an English clown who found fame on the Paris circus scene. He is famous for being part of the clown duo "Foottit and Chocolat".

He was born in Manchester, England on April 24, 1864 and his parents were George Foottit and Sarah Crockett, both circus performers. He began his career at the age of twelve. He went into exile in France where he quickly established himself as a clown.

In 1895, the clown duo, Foottit & Chocolat (Rafael Padilla) was formed. The two played together for twenty years.

After retiring, he ran a bar and restaurant near the Rond Point des Champs-Élysées. He died from cancer in Paris on 21 September 1921.

== In film ==
Several skits by the duo Foottit and Chocolat were filmed by Auguste and Louis Lumière. Later Foottit appeared in short films.

In the 2016 biopic Chocolat, George Foottit is played by James Thiérrée.

== Bibliography ==
- Noiriel, Gérard (2016). Chocolat, La véritable histoire de l'homme sans nom. Bayard. ISBN 978-2-747-06882-6.
