= Provence School =

- French: École de Provence
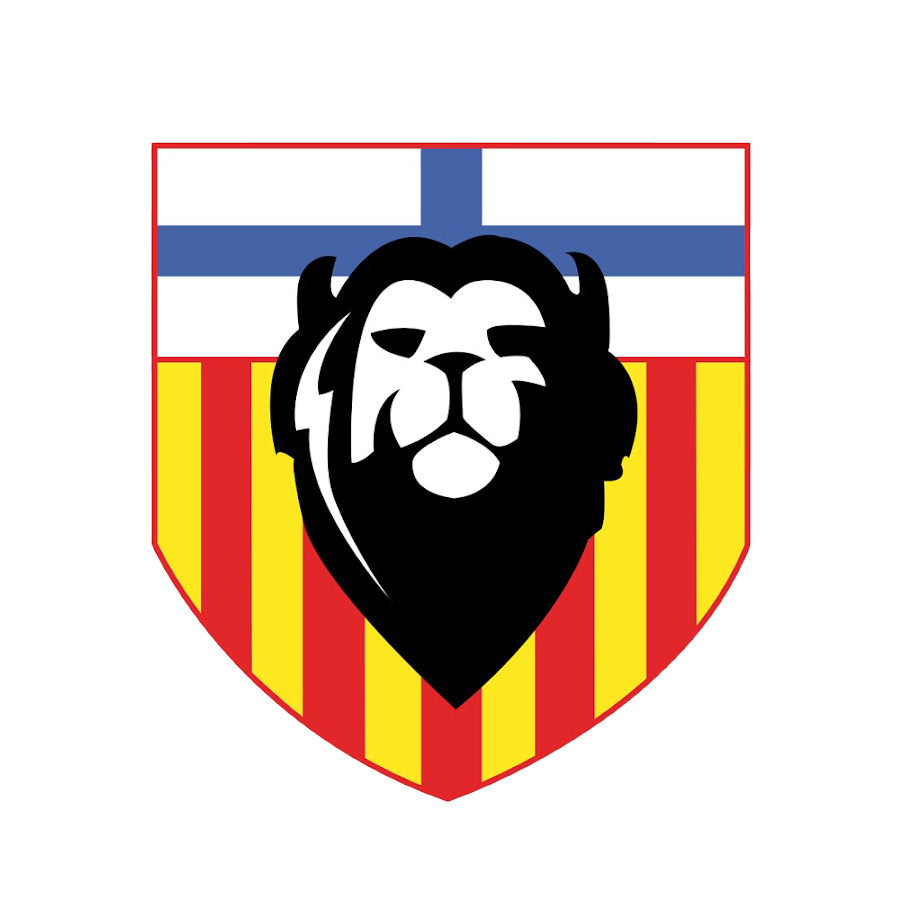

Location
- 42 Boulevard Emile Sicard; Marseille; France
- Coordinates: 43°16′13″N 5°23′2″E

Information
- Type: Private primary and secondary school
- Religious affiliation: Catholicism
- Denomination: Jesuit
- Established: 1873; 153 years ago
- Gender: Coeducational
- Enrollment: 1600
- Website: www.ecoleprovence.fr

Provence School (French: École de Provence) is a private Catholic primary and secondary school, located in Marseille, France. The school was founded by the Society of Jesus in 1873. The school enrols approximately 2,000 students and is organized under a statute of association of 1901 law and contract of association with the State.

== High school ranking ==
In 2015, the high school ranked 17th out of 77 in their department in terms of teaching quality, and 443rd at the national level.

== See also ==
- Catholic Church in France
- Education in France
- List of Jesuit schools
