= Fred Adison =

French musician

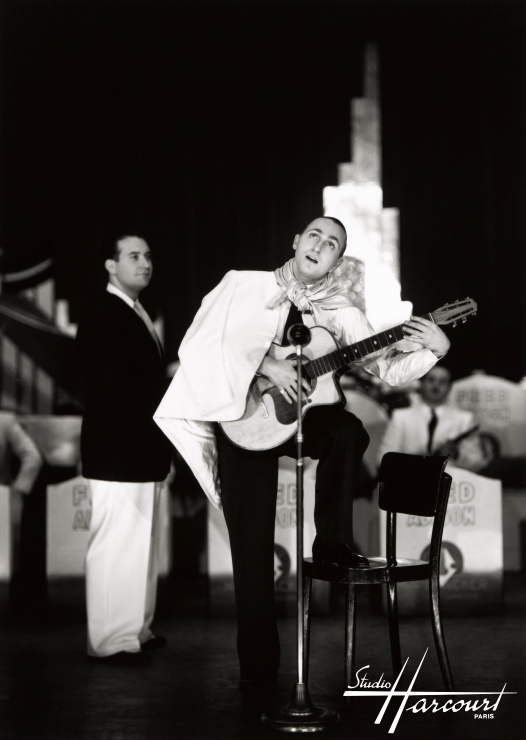
- Portrait of Fred Adison by Studio Harcourt in 1941
- Born: Albert Henri Lapeyrère; 15 September 1908; Bordeaux, France
- Died: 25 August 1996 (aged 87)
- Citizenship: French
- Occupations: Conductor; composer; singer
- Musical career
- Genres: Jazz
- Labels: Ultraphone; Gramophone; Polydor Records; Pathé

Albert Lapeyrère, better known as Fred Adison (September 15, 1908, Bordeaux – August 25, 1996, Nice), was a French jazz and light music vocalist, drummer, and bandleader.

He studied piano and violin before switching to drums. As a teenager, he became passionate about jazz and formed a small ensemble with his friends. This troupe toured France and based itself in Paris in 1931, where it scored silent short films by Charlie Chaplin and others. Alongside the orchestras of Ray Ventura and Jacques Hélian, Adison's band (often billed as Fred Adison and His Collegians) was one of the principal French backing groups for singers and films in the 1930s. Adison also recorded copiously, and released many 78 rpm commercial recordings during this time.

After the onset of World War II, he toured with Django Reinhardt in September–October 1940, and continued writing music for film. He was imprisoned in a Nazi war camp in 1943. Following the war, he led a new big band.

In 1952, Charles Spiessert, owner of Cirque Pinder, hired Fred Adison to conduct the circus orchestra, a position he held until 1962. He accompanied Luis Mariano and Gloria Lasso during this time and recorded several albums of circus music. Following this, Adison went into semi-retirement, occasionally playing with small ensembles and dance orchestras on television.

== Filmography ==
- À nous deux, madame la vie (1937)
- Kora Terry (1940)
- Le Studio en folie (1946)
- Dinner for Two (1947)
