= Hartzell Spence =

American novelist and editor (1908–2001)

John Hartzell Spence
- Born: February 15, 1908; Clarion, Iowa, United States
- Died: May 9, 2001 (aged 93); Essex, Connecticut, U.S.
- Occupation: Writer

John Hartzell Spence (February 15, 1908 – May 9, 2001) was an American writer and founding editor of Yank, the Army Weekly, a weekly magazine published by the United States military during World War II. He is credited with coining the term "pinup".

Born in Clarion, Iowa, he studied journalism at the University of Iowa graduating in 1930, and he then started working with the United Press until World War II when he became editor of Yank.

After World War II, he retired to his farm "Gaston Hall" near Orange, Virginia. Happily Ever After, his book about his farming adventures, was published in 1949. Also in 1949, he became one of the original stockholders in WJMA Radio in Orange, Virginia.

He wrote the memoir One Foot in Heaven, which was made into a 1941 film. He also wrote the sequel Get Thee Behind Me.

He also wrote Vain Shadow (1947), a romantic biography of the Spanish conquistador Francisco de Orellana. In the introduction, Spence wrote: "Vast stretches of the Amazon River remain today exactly as they were four hundred years ago, when Orellana first saw them. The descriptions of the river in this book are as I myself saw it in 1941, and as you may see it if you will go there now. Within the past decade, a scientific expedition into the upper basin, bearing the most modern equipment known to civilized man, was forced by fierce savages and fiercer sicknesses, to flee the jungle. Yet Orellana, without medicines, maps, or scientific data, without even knowing where he was, transiently mastered the river four hundred years ago, an incredible achievement in the light of modern knowledge."
