= Nouveau Cirque =

Parisian circus, operated from 1886 to 1926

Coordinates: 48.867°N 2.327°E

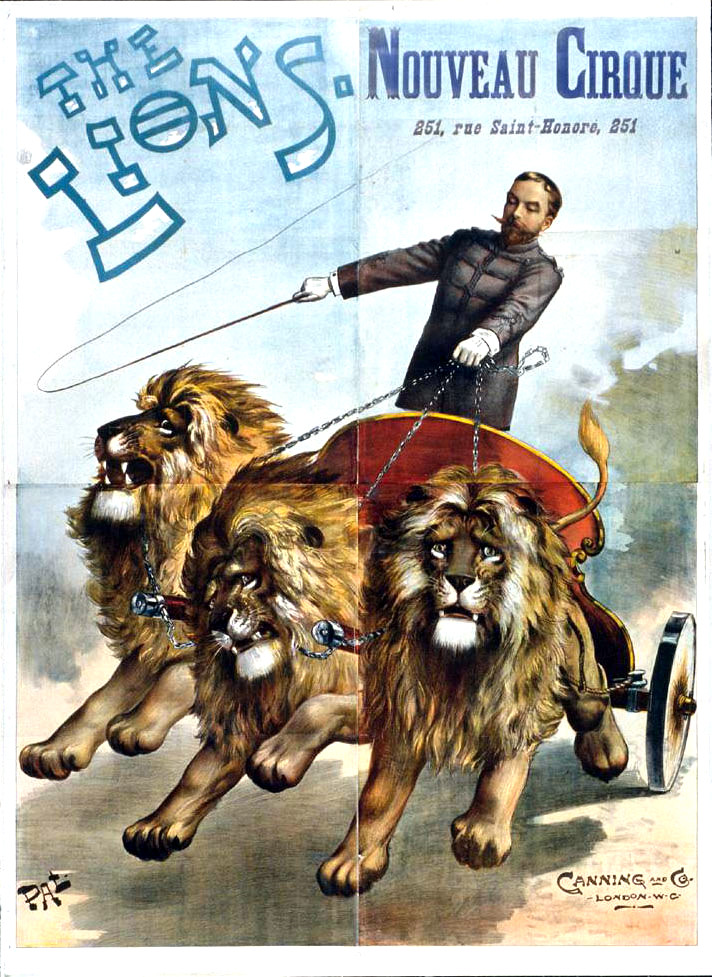
Poster for a show at the Nouveau Cirque, circa 1893

The Nouveau Cirque ("New Circus") was a circus located in Paris at 251 Rue Saint-Honoré. It was owned by Joseph Oller, co-founder of the famous Moulin Rouge. It was inaugurated on February 12, 1886, and closed on April 18, 1926, being subsequently demolished.

Its arena could be lowered by a hydraulic system to create a water basin for aquatic performances. It was one of the few buildings in Paris at the time to be completely lit by electricity. It was an upscale establishment, and patrons were required to wear formal attire.

== See also ==
- Cha-U-Kao
- Chocolat (clown)
- George Foottit
