= Belle Story =

American actress

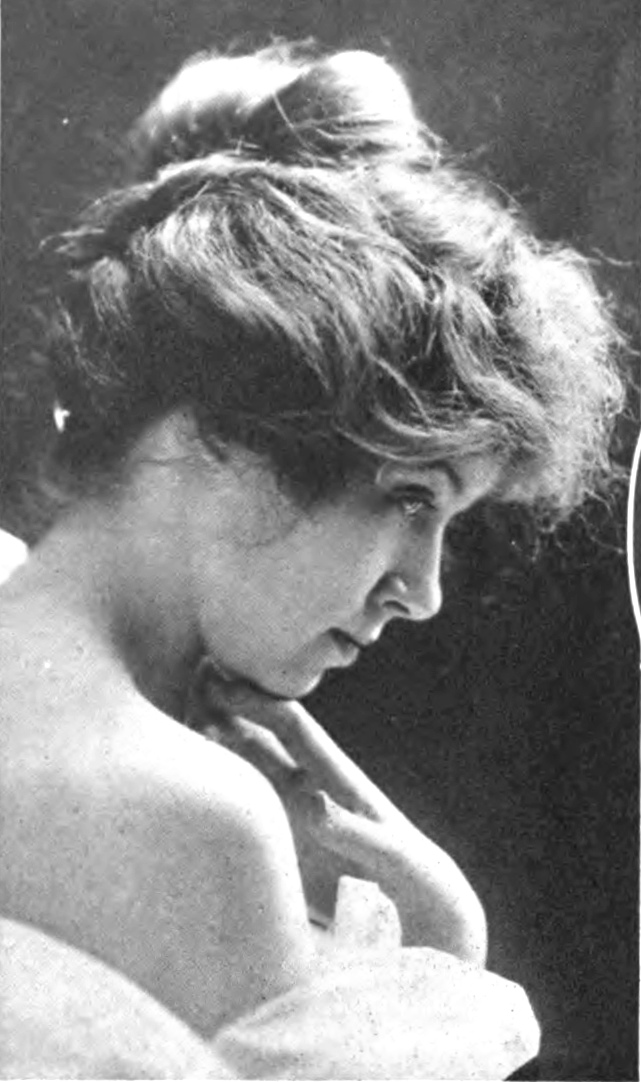
Belle Story, from a 1914 publication

Belle Story (born Grace Leard, c. 1887) was an American vaudeville performer and singer, noted for her coloratura soprano style. She appeared in a number of productions at the New York Hippodrome.

In his autobiography, composer Richard Rodgers recalled that Story "had been a leading singer at the New York Hippodrome. She had a lovely coloratura voice and made a big hit wherever we played, particularly with her singing of 'The Marriage of the Lily and the Rose.' "

== Selected performances ==
- Chin Chin
- Hip Hip Hooray (1916)
- Everything (1918)
- Happy Days (1919)
- Good Times (1920)
