= Someone Is Waiting for You (The Greater Mother Love Song) =

1917 song by Al Piantadosi

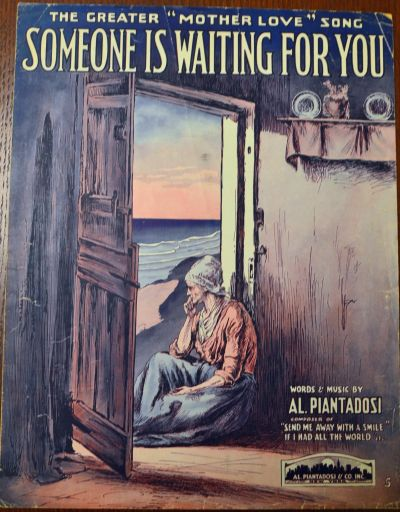
- Sheet music cover

Song
- Language: English
- Published: 1917
- Songwriter(s): Al Piantadosi

"Someone Is Waiting for You (The Greater Mother Love Song)" is a World War I song written and composed by Al Piantadosi. The song was first published in 1917 by Al. Piantadosi & Co., Inc. in New York City. The sheet music cover features an older woman sitting by an open door of a rustic home.

The sheet music can be found at the Pritzker Military Museum & Library.
