= All Aboard for Home Sweet Home =

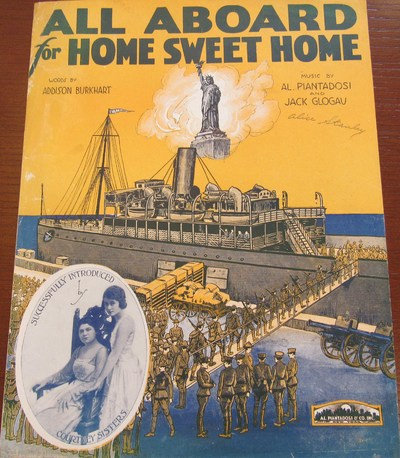
- Sheet music cover (inset photo of the Courtney Sisters)

Song by Arthur Fields
- Released: 1918
- Recorded: New York City, February 14, 1918
- Genre: Traditional pop
- Label: Columbia
- Composers: Al Piantadosi, Jack Glogau
- Lyricist: Addison Burkhardt

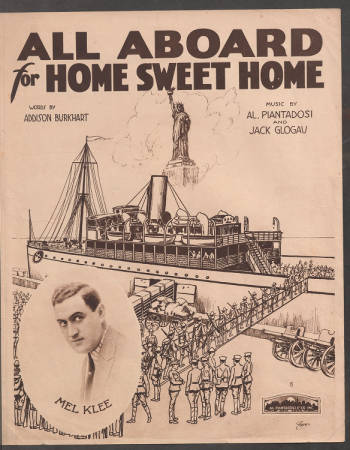
Inset photo of Mel Klee

"All Aboard for Home Sweet Home" is a World War I era song released in 1918. The lyrics were written by Addison Burkhardt. Al Piantadosi and Jack Glogau composed the music. It was published by Al Piantadosi & Co., Inc. of New York, New York. Artist Starmer designed the sheet music cover. It features soldiers boarding a troop transport. The Statue of Liberty is above the ship. Various editions feature different artists within the inset photo including, the Courtney Sisters, Elsie White, Salvation Army nurses, and Mel Klee.

On February 14, 1918, Arthur Fields recorded the song in New York City. It was released by Columbia Records. On February 27 of the same year, the Shannon Four, conducted by Rosario Bourdon, recorded a version of the song. It was released by Victor Records.

The lyrics suggest to listeners that they celebrate because the soldiers are returning home. The chorus is as follows:

All aboard for home sweet home
Again to the girl I left behind
I'll go sailing 'cross the foam again
What a welcome there I'll find
And the day that I return to her
I will make that girl my own
Hello, dear home town, I'm homeward bound
All aboard for home sweet home

The sheet music can be found at Pritzker Military Museum & Library.
