= Good Times (musical) =

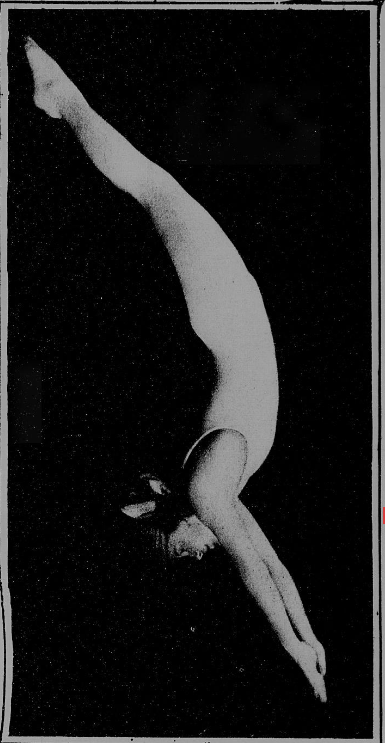
- A high diver in Good Times
- Written by: Music by Raymond Hubbell; Book by R. H. Burnside
- Original language: English
- Genre: Musical extravaganza

Premiere
- Date premiered: 9 August 1920
- Place premiered: New York Hippodrome

Good Times was a popular 1920 Broadway musical extravaganza, with music by Raymond Hubbell and a book by R. H. Burnside. Produced by Charles Dillingham, it debuted on August 9, 1920 at the Hippodrome in New York City and ran for 456 performances, the longest run for the 1920–21 season. It was sixth of Dillingham's elaborate spectacles at the Hippodrome.

The popular songs of the "musical spectacle" were The Valley of Dreams, Colorland, and The Wedding of the Dancing Doll. Featuring among the large cast were Abdullah's Arabian troupe, Nanette Flack, The Poodles Hanneford Family (trick horsemen), Joe Jackson, Joseph Parsons and Belle Story. The famed clown Marceline, a prior fixture at the Hippodrome, also returned for the show.

A representative blurb on the show in a theatre listing from 1921 stated: "Well, there are elephants, and diving girls, and Joe Jackson – and everything." A rave review in The New York Clipper stated that "the show ... is positively the greatest and most worth-while one of its kind this country has ever seen. ... In pretentiousness it has no equal. Its three acts and fifteen scenes are punched through with riotous color, scenic effects, some of which positively awe the beholder, and rollicking entertainment that has for its motif a horde of capable and versatile entertainers."

A young Cary Grant, just arrived from England, made his American stage debut as a stilt-walker in this production.

== Principal cast ==
As listed in Burns Mantle's Best Plays of 1920–21:

- Belle Story (some sources credit her as Belle Storey)
- "Happy" Jack Lambert
- Arthur Geary
- Joe Jackson
- Ferry Corwey
- Mlle. Natalie
- Emma, Louise, Bertha, and Elsie Rose (The Four Roses)
- Nanette Flack
- The Mannefords
- Joseph Parsons
- Robert MacClellan
- Daisy Smythe
- Elizabeth Coyle
- Virginia Futrelle
- The Pender Troupe
- Berlo Sisters

== Musical numbers ==
As described in the New York Clipper:

Act 1

- (Down in the) Valley of Dreams – Joseph Parsons
- Sunbeams – Alice and Edna Nash
- Morning and Night – Sascha Piatov and Mlle. Natalie
- Youth and Truth – Belle Story and Nannette Flack
- Wake Up Father Time – William Williams
- The Land I Love – Story and Arthur Geary with Chorus

Act 2

- The Wedding of the Dancing Doll – Story with Chorus
- You Can't Beat the Luck of the Irish – Arthur Geary and Chorus
- Dance: Harlequin and Columbine – Sascha Piatov and Mlle. Natalie
- Hands Up – "Happy" Lambert
- (You're) Just Like a Rose – Flack and Parsons
- Hello Imagination – Lambert and Chorus
- I Want to Show You Colorland – Story, Geary and Chorus

Act 3

- Sing a Serenade – Flack
- Welcome Truth – Parsons
- Truth Reigns Supreme – Story and Chorus
