= R. H. Burnside =

American theater director and playwright (1873–1952)

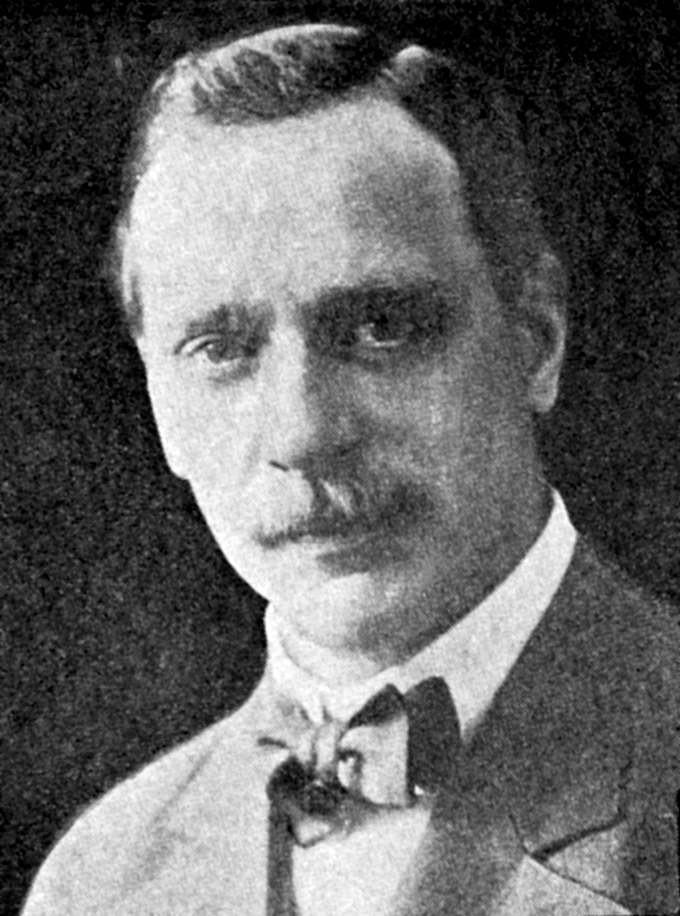
R. H. Burnside in 1922

Robert Hubber Thorne Burnside (August 13, 1873 – September 14, 1952) was an American actor, director, producer, composer, and playwright. He was artistic director of the 5,200-seat New York Hippodrome from 1908 to 1923. He wrote and staged hundreds of dramas, musicals and theatrical spectacles.

== Early life and education ==
Burnside was born in Glasgow, Scotland. His father was George Burnside, a manager of the Gaiety Theatre in Glasgow. His mother was Margaret Thorne, an actress, whose father was William Hubberthorne, a theatre proprietor. His siblings were Janet Agnes (born about 1853), John, Ann R., Isabella, and George. Burnside attended the Great Yarmouth Academy.

== Career ==
As a child Burnside traveled on theatrical tours with his mother. His first stage appearance was as a dog in The Bohemian Girl in a royal command performance, starring Edward O'Connor Terry, before the Prince of Wales, later King Edward VII. Burnside attended school in Great Yarmouth. He took a brief break to join a wagon circus at age six but returned to school when the venture proved unsuccessful. The family eventually moved to London and Burnside became a call boy to the Gaiety Theatre. He was befriended by director and stage manager Richard Barker who, observing Burnside's eagerness, taught him much about theater.

According to his passport application, he arrived in New York in October 1894, invited by Lillian Russell to direct her productions. Beginning in 1900, he directed musicals at Broadway theatres. He was artistic director of the 5,200-seat New York Hippodrome from 1908 to 1923. He composed the scores, wrote the librettos for, and directed the Broadway productions The Tourists, Fascinating Flora (which he also produced), Jack o' Lantern, Happy Days, Good Times, Tip Top and Better Times. The New York Times praised his book for the musical Miss Billions in 1919. He was the librettist and director for A Trip to Japan (1909, which he also produced), The International Cup, Chin Chin, Hip Hip Hooray!, The Big Show, Cheer Up, Everything, Stepping Stones, and Three Cheers. He also directed the Broadway productions of others' works, such as The Emerald Isle (1902), The Earl and the Girl (1905) and many others. He joined ASCAP in 1914 as a charter member and collaborated with such composers as Raymond Hubbell and Gustave Kerker. His most famous songs were "You Can't Beat the Luck of the Irish", "Ladder of Roses", "Nice to Have a Sweetheart" and "Annabelle Jerome". In 1935, 1942 and 1944, he staged many revivals of Gilbert and Sullivan operas on Broadway.

The recording "The Ladder of Roses" from Hip-Hip-Hooray (1916) is not just a rendering of the song but documents a supposed rehearsal with Burnside in charge. He offers pointed and humorous criticism of the women's chorus, which finally sings the song's refrain at the recording's conclusion. During the course of Burnside's near-monologue, he introduces double entendres referencing some of the notable Hippodrome shows such as Chin-Chin, Stop, Look, Listen and Cheer-Up. Here are two brief excerpts:

BURNSIDE: How many absences Mr. Stewart? Only one? Ah – Cleopatra Cassidy again! Wonder what the excuse will be this time. I suppose she's had a fire in her house and she's waiting for the engines to arrive. Ah, here she is now. Good morning, Cleopatra. What's the trouble this time? Subway tied up again? No? Well, what happened? You're fifteen minutes late and everybody's waiting for you. What's that?

CLEOPATRA: Had some trouble with my motor again!

BURNSIDE: Well, you'll have some trouble with your salary again at the end of the week. Now come along everybody and let's get this rehearsal started. (choristers start talking noisily among themselves) Stop talking girls! This isn't a suffragette meeting.

Another excerpt: "Now stop, look, and listen all of you. The singing last night was awful. You must pay more attention to the musical director. All except you, Agnes – you're paying too much attention to him. If you don't stop it, I'll call his wife's attention to you!" This recording was reissued on CD in the 1990s on the set Music from the New York Stage, 1890–1920

In 1924, he directed the film Manhattan.

Burnside was the Shepherd (president) of The Lambs club from 1918 to 1921.

== Personal life ==
In 1905, Burnside married Katherine. The couple had three daughters, Catherine, born about 1907, Helen Marguerite, born March 1, 1912, and Betty, born about 1914. Helen married George Edward Blewitt on September 21, 1935. Burnside became a naturalized American citizen in Manhattan on July 3, 1917. His wife Katherine died in 1940.

Burnside died at the Middlesex Nursing Home in Metuchen, New Jersey.

== Legacy ==
Because of his position as director and producer at the Hippodrome, Burnside inherited the legacies of Charles Dillingham and Charles Frohman. Upon his death, the material – including an extensive correspondence, business records, scripts, costume designs and other material – was donated to The New York Public Library. There the business records and correspondence are in the Manuscripts Division; scripts, production notes and designs are in the Billy Rose Theatre Division, and musical scores are held in the Music Division.
