= Raymond Hubbell =

American writer, composer, & lyricist (1879–1954)

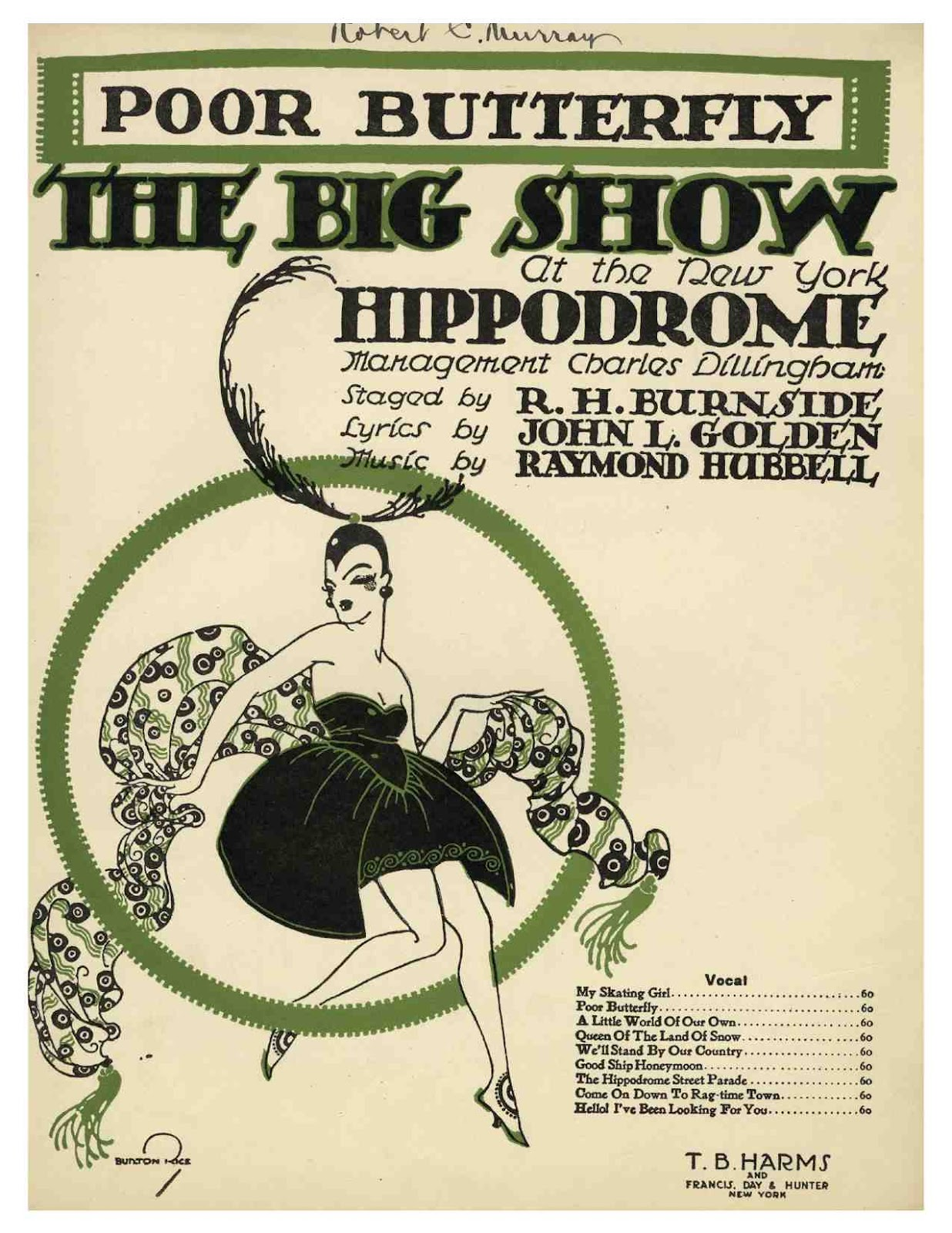
Sheet Music for Poor Butterfly, 1916

John Raymond Hubbell (June 1, 1879 – December 13, 1954) was an American writer, composer and lyricist. He is best known for the popular song, "Poor Butterfly".

== Life and career ==
Hubbell was born in Urbana, Ohio. He attended schools in Urbana and studied music in Chicago, where he formed a dance band.

He worked for Charles K. Harris Publishers as a staff arranger and pianist. His first compositions for stage musicals were the songs for Chow Chow (lyrics and book by Addison Burkhardt), which ran for 127 performances in Chicago in 1902. Renamed and revised as The Runaways in 1903, the show ran for 167 days in New York and then toured for several years. Hubbell began composing music for the Ziegfeld Follies in 1911 and eventually scored seven editions.

In 1915 he was hired as musical director for the New York Hippodrome after the previous music director, Manuel Klein, left abruptly after a disagreement with Lee Shubert and Jacob J. Shubert. Hubbell also wrote the score for "Good Times", which ran for 456 performances at the New York Hippodrome. He continued composing for the theater until 1923. The song he is most remembered for, "Poor Butterfly", was written for one of the first shows he wrote for the Hippodrome, The Big Show. According to his obituary, he thought his best song was "The Ladder of Roses", written for the 1915 Hippodrome hit, Hip-Hip-Hooray.

His last Broadway work was the score for the 1928 musical Three Cheers, starring Will Rogers. In reviewing the show, Brooks Atkinson wrote "Most of the music is unpretentiously melodious." Soon after he retired to Miami, Florida.

He was one of the nine founding members of ASCAP in 1914. For 23 years he was head of the membership committee, and for 7 years was its treasurer. At the age of 50, Hubbell opted for retirement

== Death ==
Hubbell suffered a mild stroke on March 7, 1947. He suffered a serious stroke on November 28, 1954, and died on December 13. He was survived by his wife Estelle, whom he married in about 1914.

== Partial list of works ==
- The Runaways (1903) (first played as Chow Chow in Chicago)
- Fantana (1905)
- A Knight for a Day (1907)
- The Midnight Sons (1909)
- The Bachelor Belles (1910)
- The Jolly Bachelors (1910)
- Ziegfeld Follies for 1911, 1912, 1913, 1914, and 1917
- A Winsome Widow (1912)
- The Man from Cook's (1912), lyrics by Henry Blossom
- Hip! Hip! Hooray! (1915)
- Ladder of Roses (1915) (with R. H. Burnside)
- For the Honor of the Flag (1916) (with R. H. Burnside)
- The Big Show (1916) (featuring the song Poor Butterfly)
- Cheer Up, Liza (1917) (with John L. Golden)
- I'll Be Somewhere in France (1917) (with Gene Buck & George V. Hobart)
- Melody Land (1917) (with John L. Golden)
- Follow the Flag (1918) (with John L. Golden & R. H. Burnside)
- The Kiss Burglar (1918)
- Everything (1918)
- We'll Stand by Our Country (1918) (with John L. Golden)
- Happy Days (1919)
- I Want to Go Back to the War (1919) (with Henry Blossom)
- Good Times (1920)
- Better Times (1922)
- Yours Truly (1927)
- Three Cheers (1928)
