= Therese Renz =

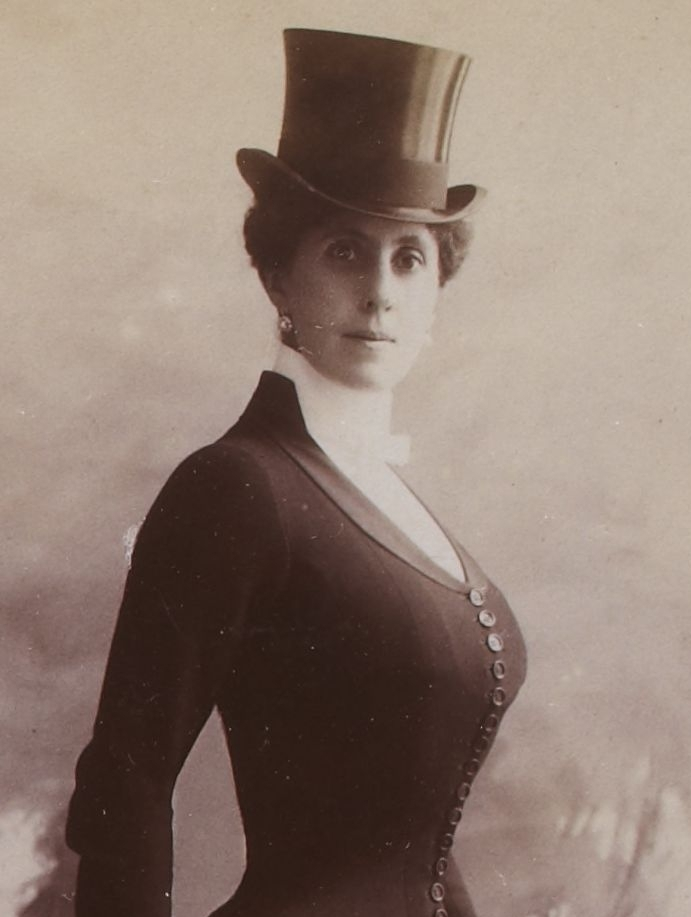
Therese Renz

Therese Renz (1859 – 1938) was a Belgian circus equestrian. Performing from her teens until her seventies, she was especially renowned in the late 19th century, when she was known as the ‘White Lady’ of European circus.

== Life ==
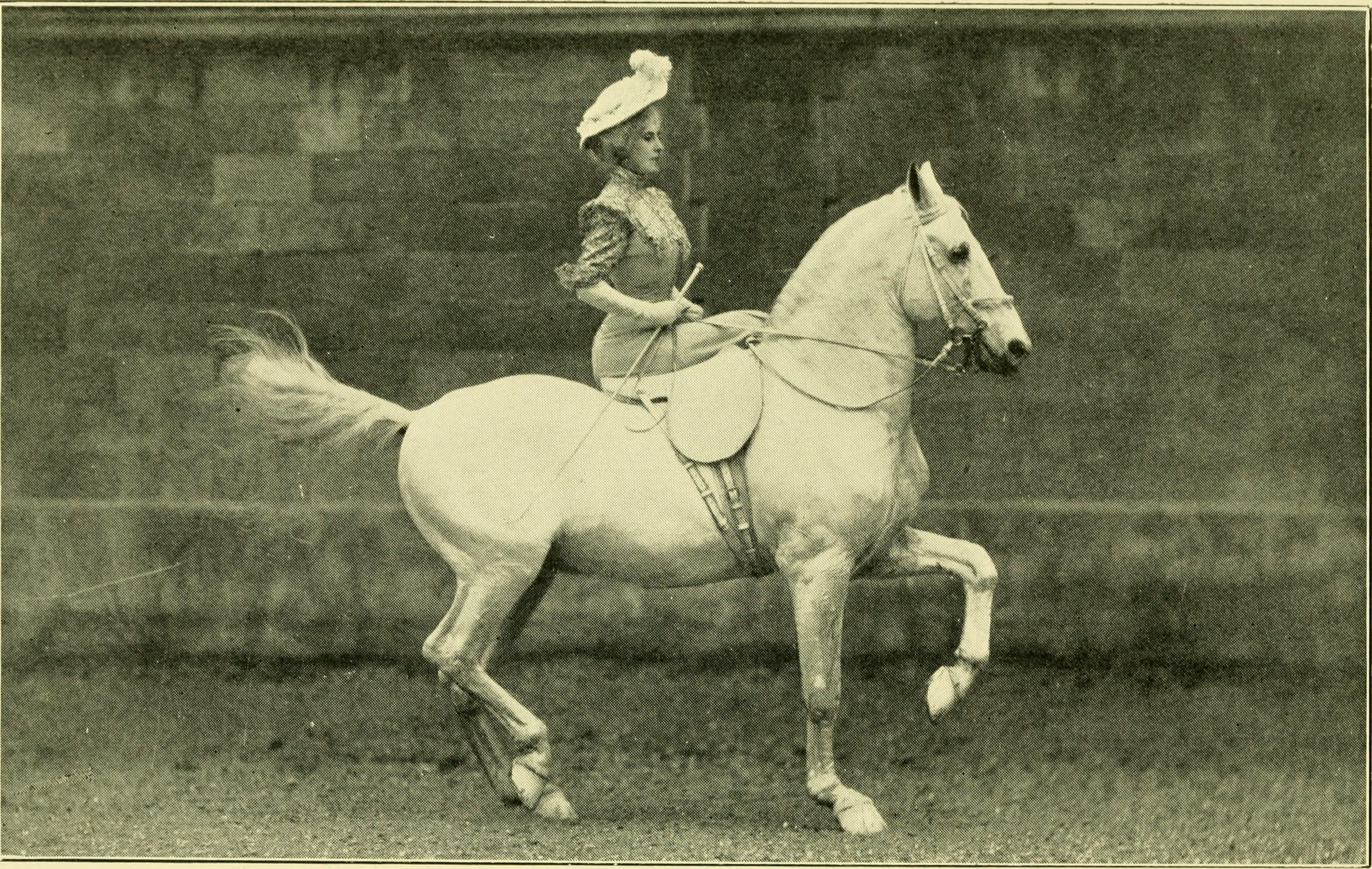
Renz performing a 'Passage en Place'

She was born Thérèse Stark in Brussels on 10 April 1859 to ringmaster Wilhelm Stark and Lina Wunderlich, a circus equestrian. The couple had formed their own Circus Stark, but Wilhelm abandoned the family when Therese was a child. She and her mother lived on a farm in Hungary. Therese left home began training with the Wulff Circus in Switzerland at the age of 13 and made her debut on 10 April 1873, aged 14.

Therese joined the German Circus Renz, founded by Ernst Renz, in 1874. In 1883, she married Ernst’s nephew, Robert Renz, and the couple left the circus due to Ernst’s disapproval. They had a son, Hugo.

At the height of her career in the 1880s and 1890s, Renz developed her signature act, called Der Weiss Dame (‘The White Lady’). Her act included dressage skills such as horse dancing, bowing, and jumping with a skipping rope. She wore a white costume and rode a Lipizzan horse named Conversana.

Renz spent a year performing in vaudeville shows in the United States 1905 – 6, including at the New York Hippodrome in the musical A Yankee Circus on Mars, and at the Temple Theatre in Detroit.

After the deaths of her husband and son, Renz formed her own travelling equestrian show in Belgium, with acts featuring dogs, ponies, zebras and two elephants.

In 1923, she joined a troupe in Vienna, riding a mare named Last Rose, into her seventies.

In 1934, she published a short memoir, Erinnerungsblätter aus meinem Leben ('Pages of Remembrance').

She died in 1938.
