= La Salle Theater (Chicago) =

Theater in Chicago, Illinois

Coordinates: 41°52′56.3″N 87°37′53.3″W

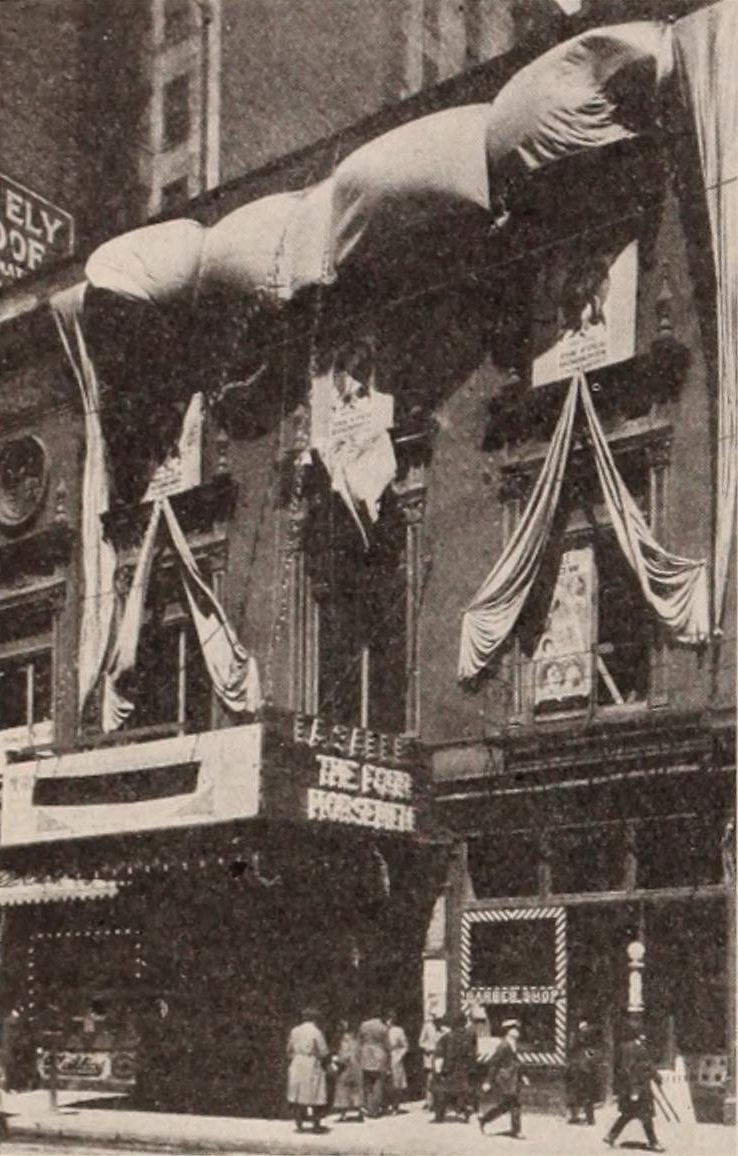
Outside the theater, 1921

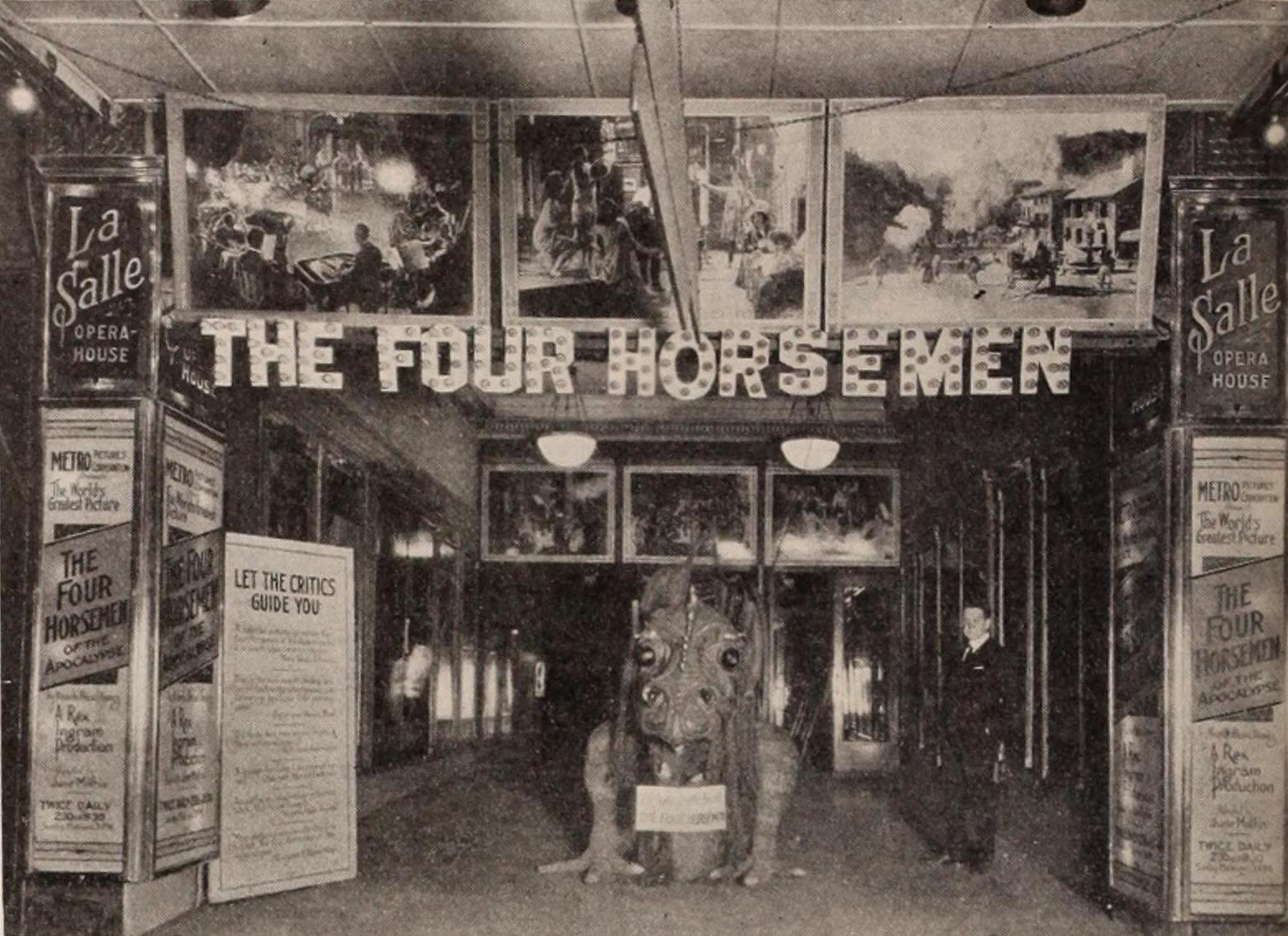
The lobby while The Four Horsemen of the Apocalypse was showing, 1921

The La Salle Theater was an influential musical, vaudevillian and dramatic playhouse in two Chicago locations, first at 137 West Madison Street, which, until December 1902, had been named the Orpheon Music Hall. The La Salle operated at that location until 1910. Then it moved into a new facility at 110 West Madison, operating as playhouse until 1927, when film began to predominate. The theater closed in the late 1940s. In the spring of 1950, the building was razed to make way for St. Peter's Church.

== History ==
The original La Salle was owned by Anna Sinton Taft, wife of Charles Phelps Taft, who was the brother of U.S. President William Howard Taft. The tenant, from about 1903 until 1910, was Mort H. Singer; in 1910, after lengthy legal action, the theater was won by Harry Askin (1864–1934) and the La Salle Opera House Company, composed of Charles W. Murphy, owner of the Chicago Cubs, Askin and several other minor associates.

In June 1917, Sinton sold the La Salle (from 118 to 116 West Madison) to S. W. Strauss & Co., headed by Albert L. Strauss (1871–1918). In 1927, La Salle began showing movies. It closed in the late 1940s. In the spring of 1950, the building was razed to make way for St. Peter's Church. In 1913, The La Salle Theater was one of 36 Chicago theaters listed in the Chicago Daily News Almanac and Year-Book of 1914.

In January 1924 gangsters Davy Miller and his brother Max were shot by Dean O'Banion of the North Side Gang as they walked out of the play Give and Take at the La Salle Theatre. On their way in they had insulted an acquaintance of O'Banion who shot them in retaliation. Max was shielded by his belt buckle but Davy was seriously injured. He was rushed to hospital where he remained in a critical condition for days before making an eventual recovery. He never told the police who had shot him.

== Selected productions ==
- The Umpire (1905), book and lyrics by Will Millan Hough (né William M. Hough; 1882–1962) & Frank R. Adams, music by Joseph E. Howard

300 performances

- The Girl Question, by Joseph E. Howard, Frank R. Adams, and Will Hough

Opening night: August 17, 1907
Over 100 performances

- The Sweetest Girl from Paris (1910), book and lyrics by Addison Burkhardt (1879–1937) & Collin Davis, music by Joseph E. Howard

Ran successfully for two years

- Louisiana Lou, by Addison Burkhardt, Frederick Donaghey, and Ben Jerome

Opening night: September 3, 1912
265 performances

== Former managers and directors ==
- Mort H. Singer (né Mortimer Henry Singer; 1876–1944), who, in addition to managing the La Salle beginning around 1906, produced and directed musicals, many of which toured. He went on to simultaneously manage many other theaters. He led more than one production, but the original one that performed at La Salle was named "La Salle Theater Stock Company."
- Ben Jerome (1881 – March 29, 1938), a Tin Pan Alley and Broadway composer and songwriter, was the music director of La Salle Theater for 12 years.
