= Addison Burkhardt =

American lyricist and writer (1879–1937)

- Addison Burkhardt, c. 1906
- Born: August 12, 1879
- Died: January 25, 1937 (aged 57)
- Occupations: Librettist and lyricist

Addison Burkhardt (August 12, 1879 – January 25, 1937) was a librettist and lyricist from about 1903 to 1922 and a Hollywood script and scenario writer thereafter.

== Biography ==
Addison Burkhardt's birth name was Abraham; he was the sixth of seven children of Ethel and Jacob Burkhardt, Russian Jews who immigrated to America in the late 1860s. Abraham was born in Washington, D. C., but he was raised first in New York and then, after 1884, in Chicago. Jacob Burkhardt died on January 16, 1893, and by 1895 Abraham had left school to work for a law firm, studying at night to qualify for the bar. At the turn of the century he gave up that profession for the entertainment business and, using the forename Addison, scored his first successes in 1902. He kept the new name for the rest of his life.

On January 8, 1907, Addison Burkhardt married Josephine Kasparek in Chicago; they had no children. Although much of his career was based in Chicago, Burkhardt had moved to New York before the marriage, and he continued to reside there until at least 1920. He traveled to Europe at least once, assessing and acquiring shows with the producer Mort Singer in 1912.

He worked closely with his brothers Charles and Max, both of whom were in the entertainment business; for Charles he wrote sketches, and with Max he briefly opened his own publishing house in 1918. The publishing venture failed, and Burkhardt's New York career began to wane; in 1923 he was recruited by Fox films and moved to California.

In Los Angeles Burkhardt anglicized his name further by dropping the “d”; he had done so occasionally before, but with increasing regularity after the start of World War I. Under his new name (sometimes also “Burkhard”) Burkhart worked for Fox for a few years; then he wrote scripts and adaptations for Warner Brothers and RKO, continuing to write and revise stage work occasionally. After 1932 his health declined, and Burkhart was in retirement at his death. He was found dead in his Los Angeles apartment on January 25, 1937, the apparent victim of influenza.died of influenza.

== Career ==
Burkhardt's career can be divided into three parts. The first, from 1902 until 1914, was centered in Chicago, where Burkhardt authored the librettos for a series of very successful productions. The second, based in New York, was devoted primarily to vaudeville routines, sketches, and lyrics for individual songs. The third was in California, where Burkhart worked primarily in film.

Burkhardt's first libretto was for Chow Chow, renamed The Runaways; a substantial hit, the music was written by Raymond Hubbell and published by Charles K. Harris, to whom Burkhardt was already contracted. Then came The Jolly Baron, with a score by Harry Von Tilzer, also a success. Both shows opened in Chicago and then toured extensively. By 1907 Burkhardt had left Harris and joined the more prestigious firm of M. Witmark & Sons. Now based in New York, he wrote lyrics and sketches for revues that included The Mimic World (1908 and 1909) and Florenz Ziegfeld's Miss Innocence (1908). In Chicago he became associated with Harry Askin, who took over the La Salle Theater in 1910. The Sweetest Girl in Paris opened the new house; a vehicle for Trixie Friganza, it had an impressive run and toured for two more years. It was followed by the even more successful Louisiana Lou (1912), with a cast led by Sophie Tucker. Both these shows, and many other of Burkhardt's scripts and vaudeville routines, incorporated comic Jewish characters, depicted by stereotypical performers like Alexander Carr and Samuel Liebert. Quite possibly Burkhardt's skill in delineating these derived from the cultural experiences of his youth. A final Chicago show, One Girl in a Million (1914) was also a success but effectively marked the end of Burkhardt's musical comedy career.

Thereafter Burkhardt wrote one-act plays, extended vaudeville sketches, and individual songs. He had written skits for his brother Charles from the beginning; a 1913 one-act, “The Cheap Skate,” proved especially popular. Other successes were the “Demi Tasse Review,” written for Isabelle D’Armond, and A Shattered Idol, for Samuel Liebert, billed as “a one-act play of Jewish life.” Burkhardt had already written individual songs in collaboration with prominent figures like Will Marion Cook and Gus Edwards. In 1915 he wrote “Israel,” with Fred Fisher, for Settling Accounts, a play by Clara Lipman and Samuel Shipman; and, with Abe Olman, he wrote “All I Need is Just a Girl Like You,” which was popular enough to be interpolated in the London production of Louisiana Lou. After 1917, Burkhardt, like many popular composers, turned to war-time themes; his “All Aboard for Home, Sweet Home,” with music by Tin Pan Alley stalwarts Al Piantadosi and Jack Glogau, was a moderate success, while “Let’s Bury the Hatchet in the Kaiser’s Head,” to which he wrote his own music, was not. Thereafter Burkhardt (now often Burkhart) seems to have lost his touch. His publishing firm failed in less than a year, and a review of his 1918 sketch, “Work or Fight,” concluded that “the turn in its present form looks hopeless.”

With tastes changing, Burkhart, like many other entertainers, moved west. He worked on silent films for Fox for several years, culminating in the scenarios for eight short comedies directed by Harold Lloyd and starring Edward Everett Horton. Then he moved into talkies, writing the scripts for two early Warner Brothers Vitaphone features, The Home Towners and Queen of the Night Clubs. He also wrote at least three shorts, and he was active in the Los Angeles theatre community. He seemed poised for a new round of success when illness forced his retirement in 1932.

Burkhardt was not an innovator, but he worked consistently to maintain the high reputation gained with his early musical comedies. He showed remarkable flexibility in adjusting to shifts in taste and media, changing genre and location as circumstances required.

== Shows authored or co-authored ==
- Chow Chow (book and lyrics; music by Raymond Hubbell). October 4, 1902, New Orpheon Music Hall (La Salle Theater), Chicago, 127 performances.
- The Runaways (revision of Chow Chow). May 11, 1903, Casino Theater, New York, 167 performances.
- The Jolly Baron; or, The Miller's Daughter (book, with Aaron S. Hoffman; lyrics by Arthur J. Lamb, music by Harry Von Tilzer; revision of The Fisher Maiden). September 13, 1904, La Salle Theater, Chicago, 94 performances.
- The Sweetest Girl in Paris (book and lyrics; music by Joseph E. Howard). August 29, 1910, La Salle Theater, Chicago, 238 performances.
- Louisiana Lou (book and lyrics, with Frederick Donaghey; music by Ben Jerome). September 3, 1912, La Salle Theater, Chicago; 265 performances.
- One Girl in a Million (book and lyrics, with Charles W. Collins; music, with Frieda Hall). September 6, 1914, La Salle Theater, Chicago; 150 performances.
