= A Knight for a Day (musical) =

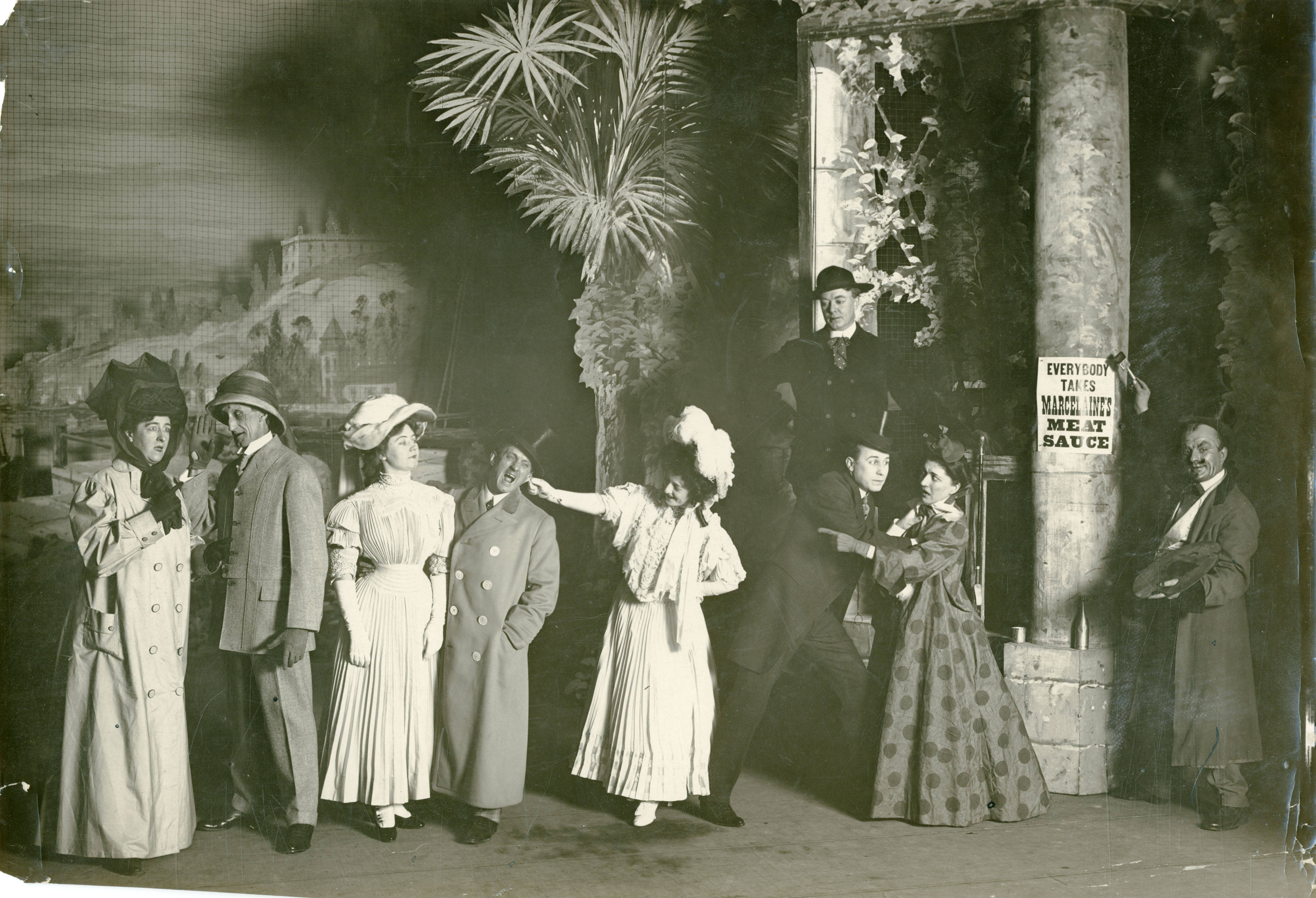
Scene from Knight for a Day which opened September 27, 1908, at the Moore Theater in Seattle

A Knight for a Day is a musical with music by Raymond Hubbell and a book and lyrics by Robert Bache Smith. It debuted in 1907. The musical held the record for longest running play in Chicago. East Coast and West Coast versions were also performed. The play was produced by B. C. Whitney.

== History ==
The play originated as Mamselle Sallie in New York with lyrics by Robert Bache Smith. It was renamed and reworked by Whitney for his Chicago theater, The Whitney Opera House where it became a hit. It played for 176 performances. It featured the song "My Very Own" by Clare Kummer.

It played at Wallack's Theatre on 30th Street and Broadway from December 1907 until May 1908. The play is set at Mme. Woodbury's Seminary for Young Ladies in Evanston and the island of Corsica.

Munsey's Magazine described it as "no show for the high brows" with madcap dance numbers. Another write-up describes it as a treatment with a pleasant score featuring a plot about trying to match lockets.
