= The Runaways (musical) =

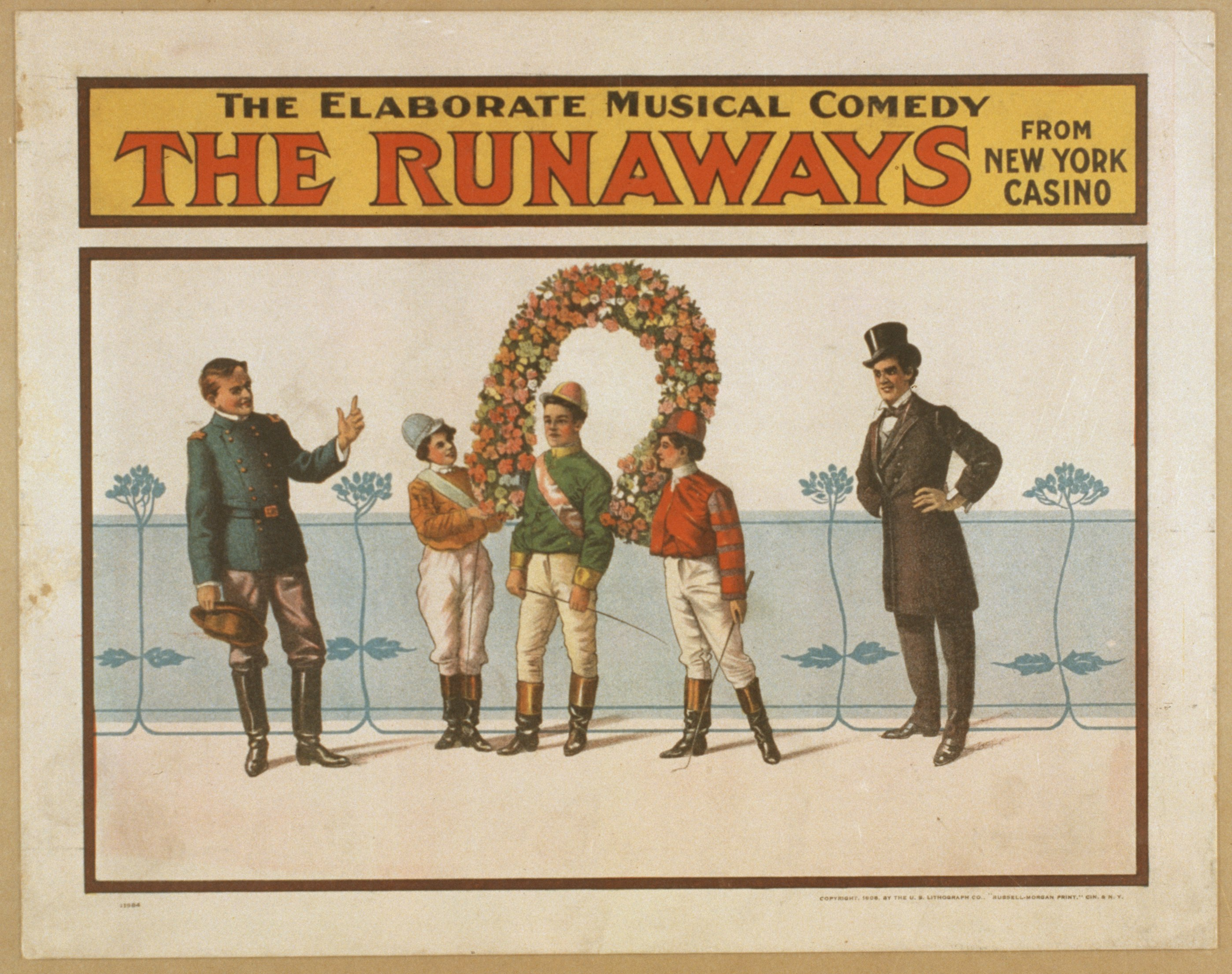
Poster for The Runaways

The Runaways (Broadway, 1903), originally Chow Chow (Chicago, 1902), was an American comedy musical with book and lyrics by Addison Burkhardt and music by Raymond Hubbell. The show was joined by Fay Templeton when it came to Broadway. The musical is set at a club and race track in Saratoga County, New York, and on the fictional Isle of Table d'Hote. The musical may be the origin of the phrase How much wood would a woodchuck chuck?.
