= Charles Bancroft Dillingham =

American theatre producer

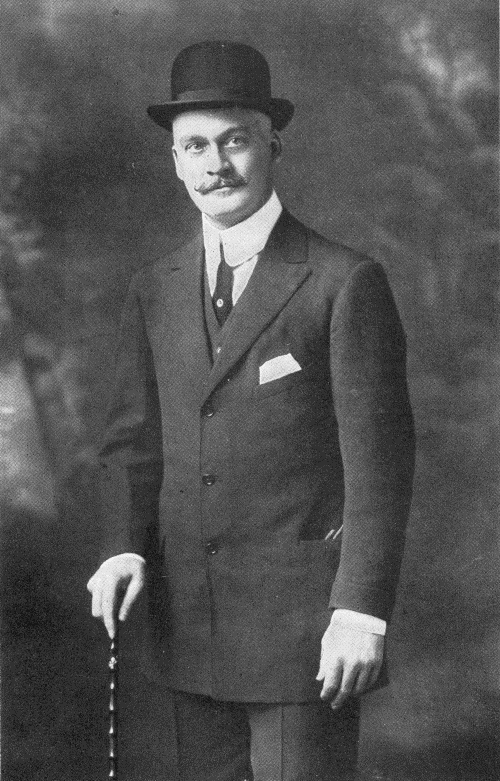
Charles B. Dillingham

Charles Bancroft Dillingham (May 30, 1868 – August 30, 1934) was an American theatre manager and producer of over 200 Broadway shows.

== Biography ==
Charles Bancroft Dillingham was born on May 30, 1868, in Hartford, Connecticut, to Edmund Bancroft Dillingham, an Episcopalian clergyman and Josephine Potter. He graduated from the Hartford schools and went to work for a newspaper in Hartford, which sent him to Washington, D.C., as a correspondent. He then went to Chicago where he joined the staff of the Chicago Times-Herald. He subsequently moved to New York City and was hired by The Evening Sun for $15 per week. He became a theater critic for the New York Post. In 1896 he wrote a play "Ten P.M." which was produced at the Bijou Theater. The producer Charles Frohman saw it and offered Dillingham a job as an advertising agent. They formed a theatrical alliance and a friendship that lasted until Frohman died in the 1915 sinking of the RMS Lusitania.

After leaving the employ of Frohman he formed the Dillingham Theatre Corporation. He also was associated over many years with A. L. Erlanger and Florenz Ziegfeld. The three were the principals of the A.L. Erlanger Amusement Enterprises, Inc. The 1936 Academy Award for Best Picture Winner The Great Ziegfeld told the story not only of Ziegfeld but also of Dillingham although it used the name "Billings" for Dillingham' likely due to Dillingham estate issues in which the Ziegfeld estate was owed money by the bankruptcy of Dillingham in 1933.

Dillingham was also the owner of the Hippodrome, which in its time was the largest theatrical venue in the world. There he produced ice skating spectacles and competitions, dance stars such as Anna Pavlova, and it is where 'Poor Butterfly' was first heard. On January 10, 1910, he opened the Globe Theatre (now known as the Lunt-Fontanne Theatre) at Broadway and 46th Street which was the first ever theater venue with a retractable roof.

Dillingham also introduced and managed dozens of star actors including Julia Marlowe and Ruby Keeler.

== Productions ==
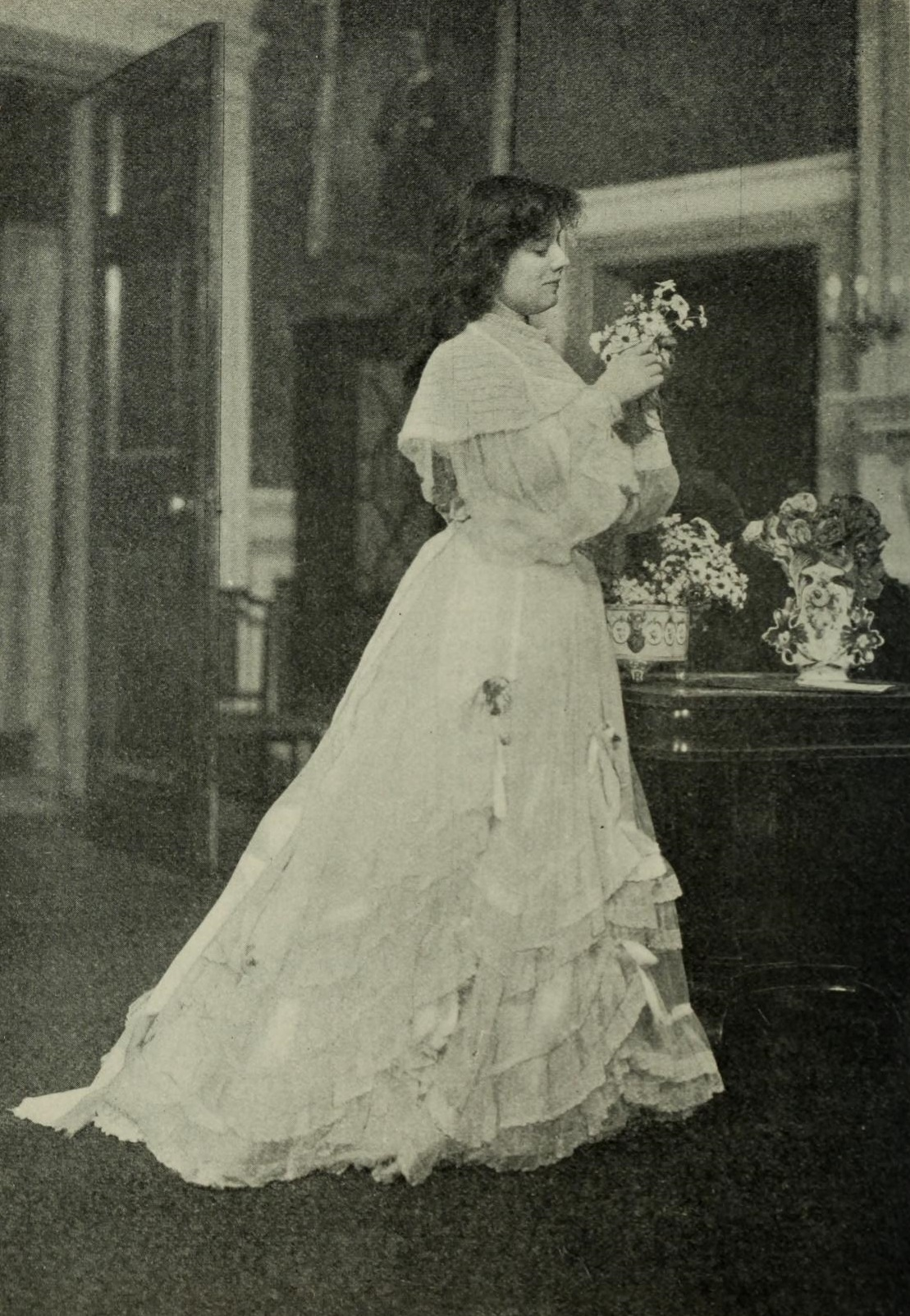
Julia Marlowe in The Cavalier (1902)

Dillingham began his producing career in 1902, with a production of The Cavalier, starring Julia Marlowe, William Lewers and Frank Worthing. His other noteworthy productions include the following:

- The Little Princess, 1903
- Miss Dolly Dollars, 1905
- The Echo, 1910
- Miss 1917, 1917
- A Bill of Divorcement, featuring Katharine Cornell, 1921
- Good Times, 1920
- Bulldog Drummond, 1921
- Peter Pan, 1924
- The Little Minister, 1925
- Oh, Please!, 1926
- Sidewalks of New York, featuring Ruby Keeler, 1927
- Waterloo Bridge, 1930

He also produced several musicals and musical reviews during his career, including Watch Your Step, the first musical by Irving Berlin (which featured Vernon and Irene Castle in their Broadway debut).

In 1915, Dillingham hired the Russian prima ballerina Anna Pavlova to perform in New York City for six months.

== Personal life ==
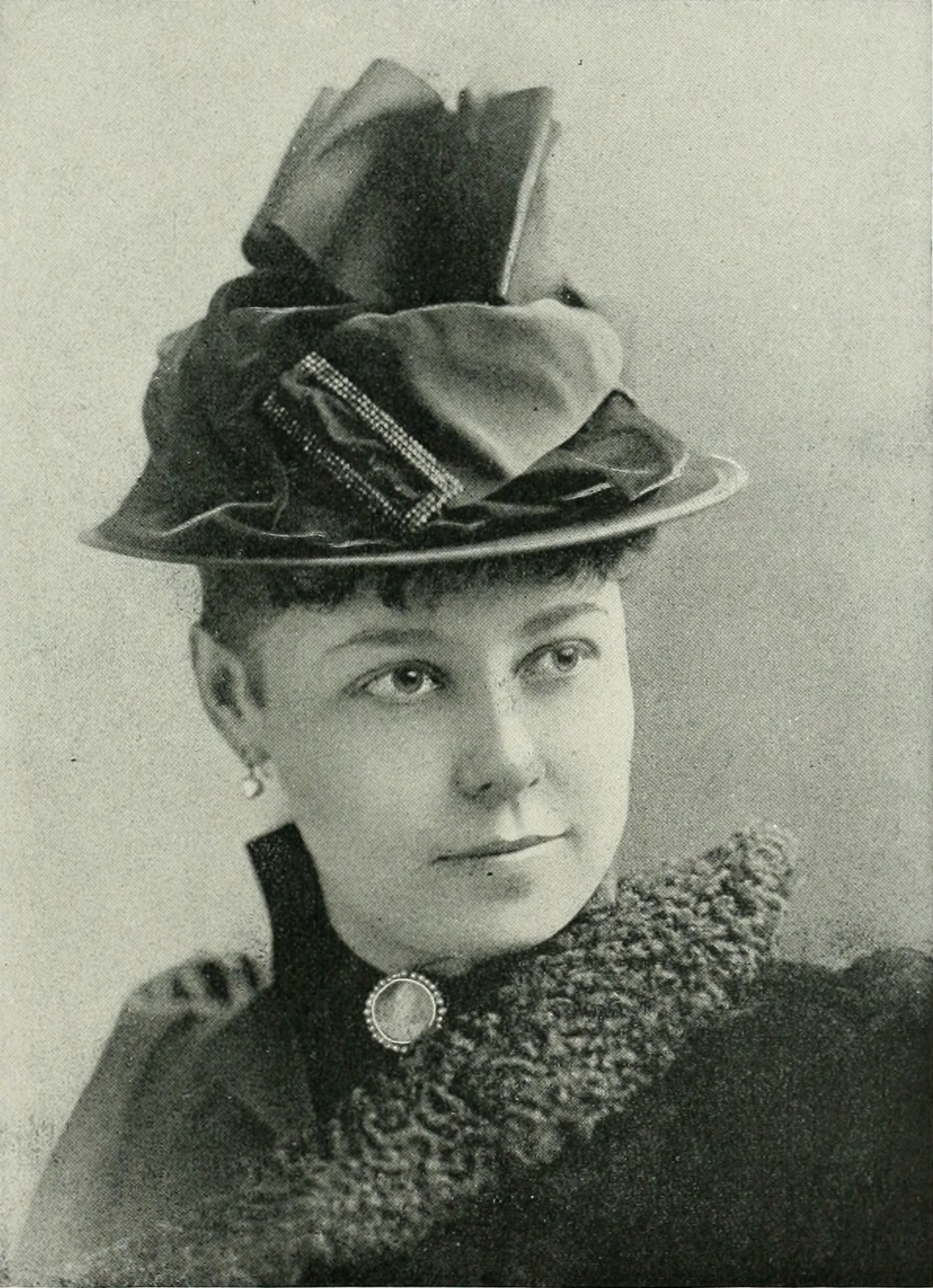
Jennie Yeamans

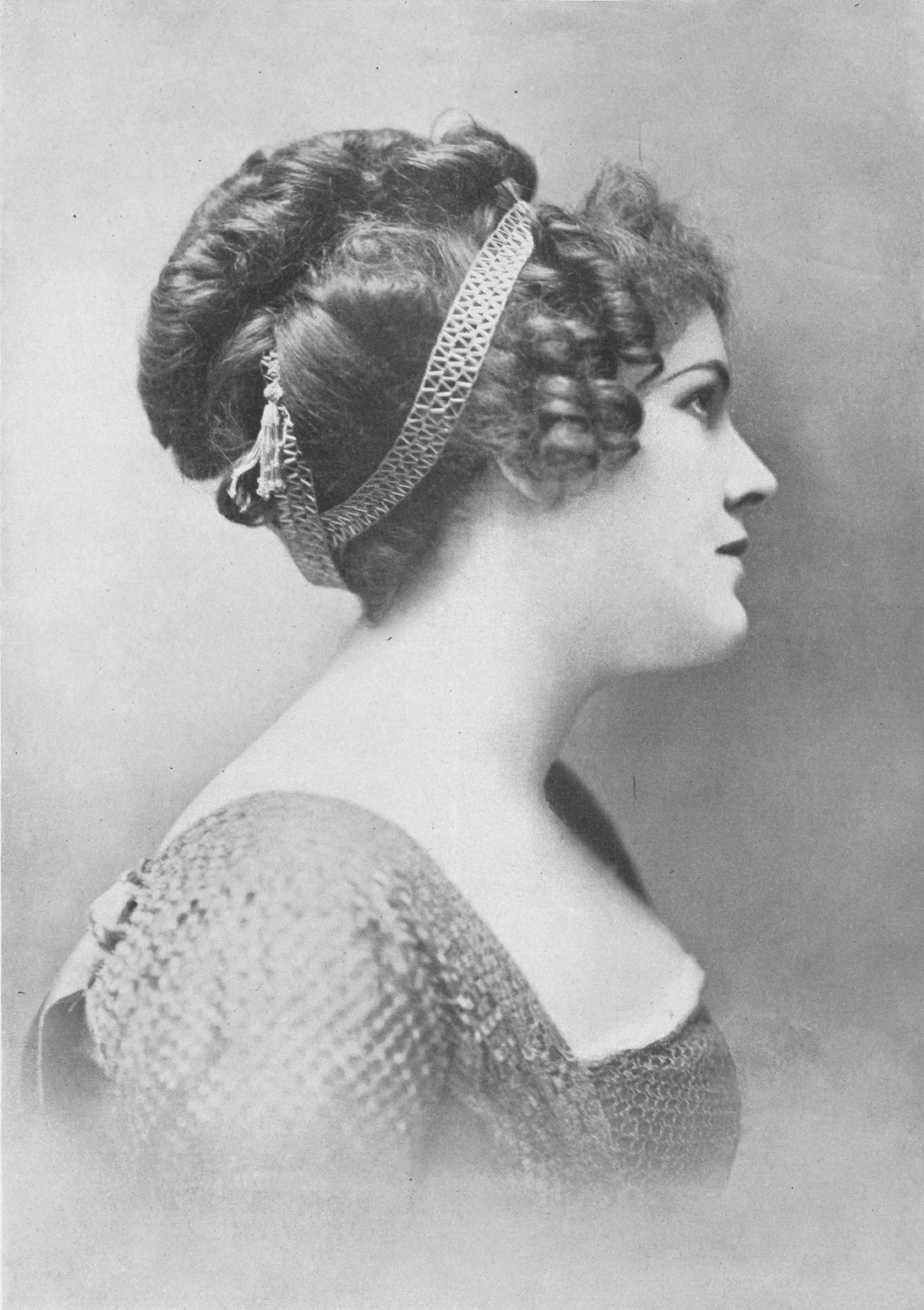
Eileen Kearney

Dillingham's two wives were both actresses

Dillingham was married in 1896 to actress and singer Jennie Yeamans who was a former child star. She died in 1906. On May 5, 1913, in Purchase, New York, he married Eileen Ann Kearney formerly of Stillwater, Minnesota. The new Mrs. Dillingham was part of the Alla Nazimova dance troupe and later was in several productions of Dillingham's. Dillingham bought his wife the Barbara Rutherford Hatch House in 1920. The couple were regulars in society just as the old guard and the theater world began mingling. They were among the early snowbirds fleeing to Palm Beach during the winter season. They were often at European social scenes such as the Ascot and Longchamp racecourses. The marriage broke up in August 1924 after Mrs. Dillingham became enamored of Julian Broome Livingston Allen, twelve years her junior, whom she married in October of that year. The divorce caused a sensation and was reported in Time magazine. Eileen was a lifelong friend of Florenz Ziegfeld's wife the actress Billie Burke. She died in 1957 after divorcing her second husband in 1936, whom she had married twice.

There have been various reports and rumors of Dillingham's homosexuality including a longtime relationship with Charles Frohman, with whom he lived for some time between his marriages. His second wife's family believed theirs to be a marriage of convenience. He was a pall bearer at Harry Houdini's funeral where he was thought to have quipped, "Let's see him get out of this one."

Ill health and the stock market crash of 1929 forced Dillingham to give up producing. The writer Damon Runyon mentioned him in a short essay called ‘A Dog’s Best Friend’:

“”Damon, what becomes of a man's friends when he gets sick?"

"I could not answer that one. It reminded me of a somewhat similar question asked by the once great theatrical producer, Charles Dillingham, at a time when he was broke and commencing to be forgotten along the big street, of which he was once one of the most glamorous and successful figures. He was sitting on a stool at a drugstore lunch counter when a gabby guy who knew who he was took the stool beside him and began babbling."

"I wonder what's become of so-and-so?" he finally wondered, naming a Broadwayfarer who had sunk into obscurity.

"I don't know", said Dillingham, adding thoughtfully, "I wonder what's become of Dillingham?"”

Dillingham died of bronchopneumonia on August 30, 1934, at the Hotel Astor where he lived.
