= Marceline Orbes =

Spanish clown

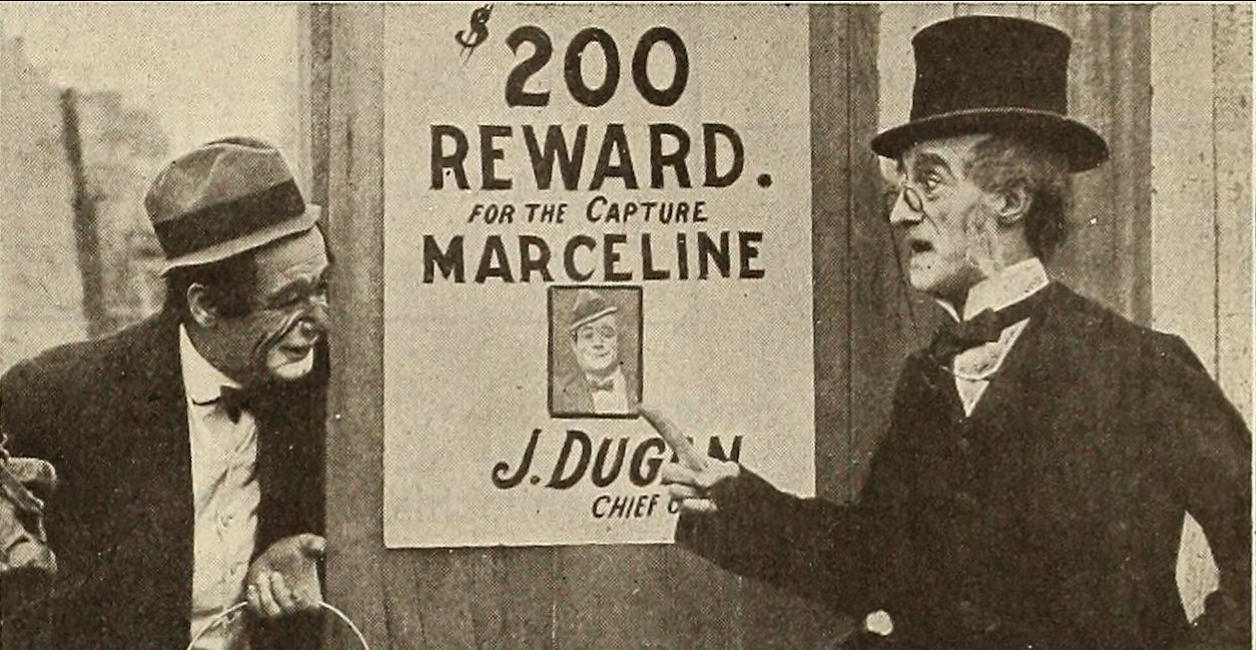
- Marceline (on left and on Wanted poster) in The Mishaps of Marceline (1915)
- Born: May 15, 1873; Jaca, Spain
- Died: November 5, 1927 (aged 54); New York City
- Occupation: Clown

Isidro Marcelino Orbés Casanova (May 15, 1873 – November 5, 1927), best known simply as Marceline, was a world-renowned clown during the late 19th and early 20th century.

== Early life ==
Marceline was born in Jaca, Spain in 1873, performed in Spain, France and other continental european countries, made his way to England by around 1895. He had success at the London Hippodrome and then enticed by producers Thompson and Dundy to come to the New York Hippodrome, where he arrived with great fanfare in 1905. He was a part of shows at the Hippodrome through 1915, by which time his pantomime routine and falling gags were falling out of favor with the public. He did reappear at the Hippodrome for some later shows, including Good Times in 1920-21 and Better Times in 1922-23.

Attempts to succeed in the restaurant business in New York and Connecticut both failed, and he lost money in real estate ventures. Out of work and out of savings, Marceline was found dead in his hotel room at the Hotel Mansfield on November 5, 1927, with photographs of his glory days on the bed, and a bullet through his head.

== Later years ==
After killing himself, he was buried at Kensico Cemetery. He was survived by his wife, from whom he had been separated since 1925.

Marceline was long admired by Charlie Chaplin, who worked with Marceline at the London Hippodrome from December 1900 to April 1901, and is one of just a few performers from this period of his life that Chaplin discusses in his autobiography. Chaplin recounts seeing him years later in the United States with a circus, and though expecting to see him be a featured star, was surprised to see him only amongst other clowns.

As Marceline performed before the film era, despite the many contemporary reports of his world fame, there is a lack of documentary evidence of his performances. A 1915 Thanhouser Company film short titled The Mishaps of Marceline is lost aside from a few still frames of the clown.

== In popular fiction ==
Rod Rogers has a very short role as Marceline in the 1952 film Million Dollar Mermaid.
