= A Yankee Circus on Mars =

A Yankee Circus on Mars is a musical in two scenes with music by Manuel Klein and Jean Schwartz, lyrics by Harry Williams, and a book by George V. Hobart. It was one of four works presented together for the grand opening of Broadway's New York Hippodrome; the others being a collection of circus acts known as Circus Tournament, the ballet Dance of the Hours, and the war drama The Raiders by playwright Carroll Fleming. These four works were performed together for the Hippodrome's first public performance on April 12, 1905. Produced by Frederic Thompson and Elmer "Skip" Dundy, A Yankee Circus on Mars continued to play together with these other works at the Hippodrome for 296 performances; closing on December 9, 1905. These works then toured the United States together; beginning a national tour in Chicago in February 1906.

The cast of A Yankee Circus on Mars included Felix Haney as King Borealis, Benjamin F. Grinnell as the Messenger from Mars, and Albert Hart as Signor Thunderairo among others. It featured circus equestrian Therese Renz.

== Plot ==
The Yankee Circus is in financial trouble and may be forced to close. When King Borealis of Mars, a fan of earthly entertainments, discovers this, he sends a messenger from Mars to Earth with the offer to rescue the circus with the financial backing providing the circus will travel to the planet Mars to perform for the Martians. A gigantic spaceship transports the Yankee Circus to Mars, and they perform for King Borealis and the Martians.
