= Ben Jerome =

American musician (1881–1938)

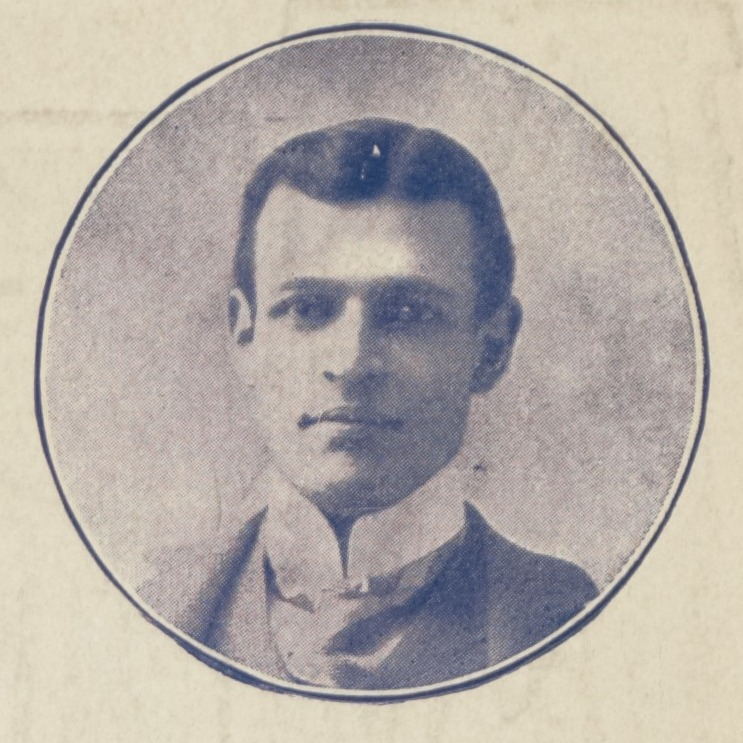
Ben Jerome

Benjamin M. Jerome (1881 – March 29, 1938), was an American composer, arranger, lyricist, songwriter, pianist, and conductor. In his early career he worked in New York City as a Tin Pan Alley composer of popular music, and was a notable arranger of ragtime music. He also composed music and/or wrote lyrics to several musicals staged on Broadway. He later lived in Chicago where he worked for 12 years as the music director of the La Salle Theater.

Jerome died in Chicago on March 29, 1938, after a five-day illness.

== Partial list of stage works ==
- Mam'selle 'Awkins (1900); one of many songwriters to contribute songs
- The Supper Club (1901); music and lyrics
- The Wizard of Oz (1902), contributed two songs to the musical
- The Darling of the Gallery Gods (1903)
- The Dress Parade (1903)
- The Isle of Spice (1904); music also by Paul Schindler
- The Royal Chef (1904)
- The Mimic World 1908 (1908); music also by Seymour Furth
- Mr. Hamlet of Broadway (1908)
- He Came from Milwaukee (1910); music also by Louis A. Hirsch
- Yes, Yes, Yvette (1926), musical in three act; music by Ben Jerome and Philip Charig; premiered December 5, 1926, Four Cohans Theatre, Chicago; Broadway premiere at the Sam H. Harris Theatre on October 3, 1927
