= Al Piantadosi =

American composer of popular music (1882–1955)

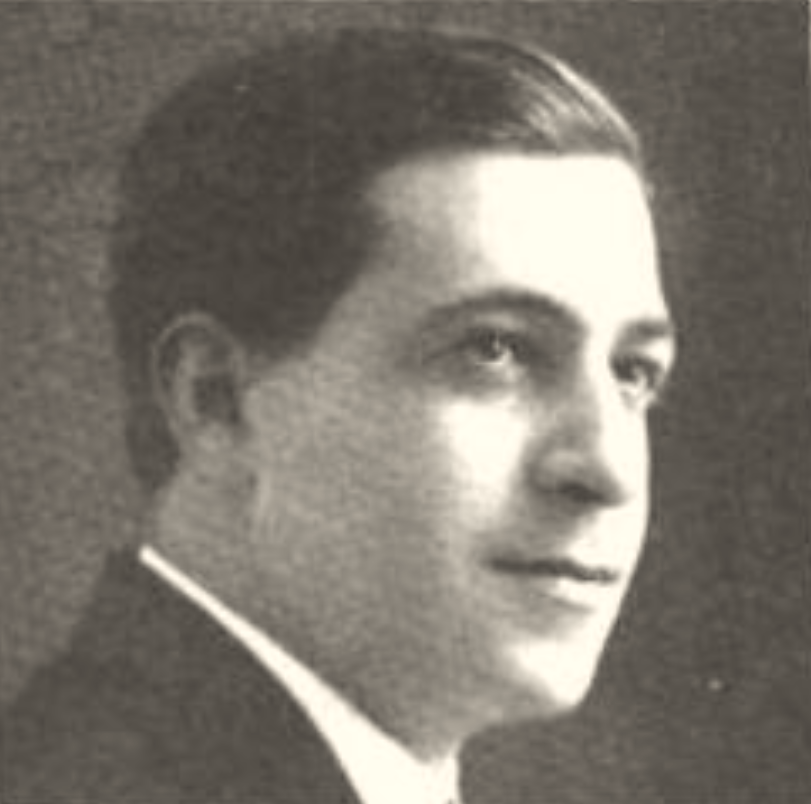

Background information
- Also known as: Ragtime Al
- Born: John Alberto Joseph Piantadosi; August 18, 1882; New York City, US
- Died: April 8, 1955 (aged 72) Encino, Los Angeles, US
- Occupations: Composer, pianist

Al Piantadosi (born John Alberto Joseph Piantadosi; August 18, 1882 in New York City (Note: Piantadosi's date of birth is, in some instances, listed as July 1883 and July 1884; however, August is the birth-month cited by Piantadosi's 1918 and 1942 military draft records, as well as his California death record. The 1900 US Census (the last name is mangled as Pafafisola but all other demographics are a match) clearly shows that Albert was born in August 1882; so this would be likely be the year of birth, given the birth months and years of his younger siblings) – April 8, 1955 in Encino, California) was an American composer of popular music during the heyday of Tin Pan Alley. He started out as a saloon and vaudeville pianist and rapidly flourished as a songwriter. For about ten years (from 1918 to 1928) he was an independent music publisher.

== Career ==
Piantadosi was born August 18, 1882, in the Italian Quarter of Manhattan, New York. Early in his career (circa 1906), Piantadosi gained recognition as "Ragtime Al," playing piano at Callahan's Dance Hall on Manhattan's at Chatham Square and Doyers Street in Chinatown, where he wrote the briefly popular "My Mariucci Take a Steamboat" with lyricist George Ronklyn (1878–1943), the bouncer at Callahan's known as "Big Jerry."

Piantadosi's compositions include "I'm Awfully Glad I'm Irish" (1910) and "That's How I Need You" (1912). "The Curse of an Aching Heart" (1913) became his most famous tearjerker. He also composed "Mississippi Days" (1916) and "If You Had All the World and Its Gold."

== War protest and subsequent controversy ==
His composition, "I Didn't Raise My Boy to Be a Soldier" (1915) became a controversial protest song. It sold 650,000 copies in the first three months, which helped establish American World War I pacifism as a quantifiable political reality. The song continued to sell well until the United States entered the World War I in 1917. Then it was pretty much discarded. However, a few pro-war writers modified the lyrics in new melodies, including "I Didn't Raise My Boy To Be A Coward," by Charles Clinton Case (1843–1918) (composer) and Franklin G. McCauley (lyricist) and "I Didn't Raise My Boy To Be A Slacker," a march by Theodore Baker (1917, G. Schirmer).

== Copyright lawsuit ==
Harry Haas brought a plagiarism suit against Leo Feist, Incorporated, claiming that the melody was from a song he composed in 1914, "You'll Never Know How Much I Really Cared" – Bill Cahalin (née William R. Cahalin; born around 1883), lyricist. The plaintiffs won. And, although credit was never changed, Cahalin won a large settlement. Adolph Deutsch (born 1868), a raincoat maker, was a one-third partner on the song with Haas and Cahalin.

== Market successes ==
Five of his compositions exceeded sales of one million copies.

== Industry advocacy ==
In 1914, Piantadosi became a charter member of the American Society of Composers, Authors, and Publishers (ASCAP).

== Music publishing ==
In 1918, Al Piantadosi and his brother, George, founded Al. Piantadosi & Company, Inc. Personnel that year included:

- Himself, Al Piantadosi, as President
- Herbert Inman Avery (1887–1955), General Manager
- Jack Glogau, Professional Manager
- George Piantadosi, Western Manager at 113 North Dearborn Street, Chicago; in February 1920, he left the firm to work for McCarthy & Fisher, Inc.

By 1920, the firm suffered financial duress, owing $40,708.87 with only $7,521.26 in the till. After reaching an agreement to pay creditors 10% in lieu of filing for protection under bankruptcy, Frank Goodman, an employee, paid it and took over the company.

From early 1923 to mid 1924, Piantadosi tried his hand at selling real estate lots in Hollywood.

== Performing ==
He was a piano accompanist for several variety artist, including Anna Chandler.

== Collaborators ==
Collaborators throughout his career included Alfred Bryan, Joe Goodwin (1889–1943), Edgar Leslie, Joseph McCarthy, and Irving Berlin. Ted Fiorito worked for him as a demonstrator, playing piano.

== Later life and death ==
In 1931, with debt of $17,717 and assets of $500, Piantadosi filed for bankruptcy in U.S. District Court for the Eastern District of New York.

Piantadosi eventually moved to California, settling in Encino and worked in semi-retirement, operating Piantadosi Music Publications and Society Records. He died in Encino, California, in 1955.

== Selected works ==
- "My Mariuccia" ("Take a Steamboat") "She's Gone Away"

Al Piantadosi (music)
George Ronklyn (1878–1943) (words)
New York: Barron & Thompson (Note: Ted S. Barron and W. A. Thompson were principals at Barron & Thompson Company of New York; the catalog of Barron & Thompson was acquired in December 1908 by the Shapiro Company) (1906)
OCLC 14397828

- "I'm A Yiddish Cowboy" ("Tough Guy Levi")

Halsey K. Mohr, Al Piantadosi (music)
Edgar Leslie (words)
New York: Ted S. Barron (1908)
OCLC 44598455

- "Good-Bye Mister Caruso"

Al Piantadosi (music)
Billy Dunham (words)
New York: Harry Cooper Music Pub. Co. (Note: Harry Cooper Music Publishing Company was incorporated in New York in 1908; the founding directors were Charles Kennedy, Moses Lazarus, and Harry Cooper, all of New York city) (1909)
OCLC 44132438 (pdf copy at the LOC)

- "Just Like The Rose"

Al Piantadosi (music)
Irving Berlin (words)
New York: Harry Von Tilzer Music Publishing Co. (1909)
OCLC 270741106

- "Good Luck Mary"

Al Piantadosi (music)
Alfred Bryan, Edgar Leslie (words)
New York: Harry Cooper Music Pub. Co. (1909)
OCLC 26008946 (pdf copy at the LOC)

- "Skidamarink" ("Skid-dy-mer-rink-adink-aboomp")

Al Piantadosi (music)
Felix F. Feist (1883–1936) (words)
New York: Leo Feist (1910)
OCLC 224064815 (pdf copy at the LOC)

- "Think It Over, Mary"

Al Piantadosi (music)
Thomas J. Gray (1888–1924) (words)
New York: Leo Feist (1910)
OCLC 43614420 (pdf copy at the LOC)

- "The Vampire Love Song"

Al Piantadosi (music)
Edgar Leslie (words)
New York: Leo Feist (1910)
OCLC 499164212 (pdf copy at the LOC)

- "That Dreamy Italian Waltz"

Al Piantadosi (music)
Joseph McCarthy (words)
New York: Leo Feist (1910)
OCLC 60749884

- "In All My Dreams, I Dream of You"

Al Piantadosi (music)
Joseph McCarthy (words)
New York: Leo Feist (1910)
OCLC 18852907 (pdf copy at the LOC)

- "I'm Awfully Glad I'm Irish"

Al Piantadosi (music)
Edgar Leslie (words)
New York: Leo Feist (1911)
OCLC 499168758

- "That Italian Serenade"

Al Piantadosi, Jack Glogau (né Jacob A. Glogau; 1886–1953) (music)
Joseph McCarthy (words)
New York: Leo Feist (1911)
OCLC 44640276 (pdf copy at the LOC)

- "Somehow I Can't Forget You"

Al Piantadosi (music)
Joseph McCarthy (words)
New York: Leo Feist (1911)
OCLC 19405116 (pdf copy at the LOC)

- "I Just Met The Fellow That Married The Girl That I Was Going To Get"

Al Piantadosi (music)
Joseph McCarthy (words)
New York: Leo Feist (1911)
OCLC 769456197

- "Honey Man"

Al Piantadosi (music)
Joseph McCarthy (words)
New York: Leo Feist (1911)
OCLC 26009303 (pdf copy at the LOC)

- "When Broadway Was A Pasture"

Al Piantadosi (music)
Joseph McCarthy (words)
New York: Leo Feist (1911)
OCLC 53154559

- "That's How I Need You"

Al Piantadosi (words & music)
New York: Leo Feist (1912)
OCLC 19405145 (pdf copy at the LOC)

- "The Curse of an Aching Heart"

Al Piantadosi (music)
Henry Fink (né Henri Finck; 1893–1963) (words)
Rosenbaum Studios (cover art) (Note: R.S. (stem rose emblem) – Rosenbaum Studios, Morris Rosenbaum (1886–1957), who formed the studio in the 1910s)
New York: Leo. Feist Inc. (1913)
OCLC 10459931 (pdf copy at the LOC)

- "Any Boy Could Love a Girl Like You"

Al Piantadosi (music)
Joe Goodwin (1889–1943), Joseph McCarthy (words)
New York: Leo. Feist Inc. (1913)
OCLC 499163608

- "Melinda's Wedding Day"

Al Piantadosi (music)
Joe Goodwin (1889–1943), Joseph McCarthy (words)
New York: Leo. Feist Inc. (1913)
OCLC 26004135 (pdf copy at the LOC)

- "Then I'll Stop Loving You"

Al Piantadosi (music)
Joe Goodwin (1889–1943), Joseph McCarthy (words)
New York: Leo. Feist Inc. (1913)
OCLC 368057469 (pdf copy at the LOC)

- "At The Yiddish Wedding Jubilee"

Al Piantadosi, Jack Glogau (né Jacob A. Glogau; 1886–1953) (music)
Joseph McCarthy (words)
New York: Leo Feist (1914)
OCLC 44677723

- "I've Only One Idea About The Girls And That's To Love 'Em"

Al Piantadosi (music)
Earl Carroll, Joseph McCarthy (words)
Rosenbaum Studios (cover art)
New York: Leo Feist (1914)
OCLC 20120183, 933673561 (pdf copy at the LOC)

- "On The Shores of Italy"

Jack Glogau (né Jacob A. Glogau; 1886–1953) (music)
Al Piantadosi (words)
New York: Leo Feist (1914)
OCLC 865597911 (pdf copy at the LOC)

- "I've Loved You Since You Were a Baby" ("And Now I Can't Live Without You")

Al Piantadosi (music)
Joseph McCarthy (words)
New York: Leo Feist (1914)
OCLC 60586175 (pdf copy at the LOC)

- "What a Wonderful Mother You'd Be"

Al Piantadosi (music)
Joe Goodwin (words)
Edward H. Pfeiffer (1868–1932) (cover artist)
New York: Shapiro, Bernstein & Co. (1915)
OCLC 11381627

- "My Own Venetian Rose"

Al Piantadosi, Jack Glogau (née Jacob A. Glogau; 1886–1953) (music)
Joseph McCarthy (words)
Rosenbaum Studios (cover art)
New York: Leo Feist (1915)
OCLC 26009701, 694150341 (pdf copy at the LOC)

- "When You're In Love With Someone"

Al Piantadosi (music)
Grant Clarke (words)
New York: Leo Feist (1915)
Rosenbaum Studios (cover art)
OCLC 31099312

- "I Didn't Raise My Boy to Be a Soldier"

Al Piantadosi (words)
Alfred Bryan (lyrics)
New York: Leo Feist (1915)
OCLC 50942651 (pdf copy at the LOC)

- "How Could Washington Be A Married Man?" ("And Never, Never Tell A Lie?")

Al Piantadosi (music)
Joe Goodwin, Ballard Macdonald (words)
New York: Shapiro, Bernstein & Co. (1916)
OCLC 21129798

- "Mississippi Days"

Al Piantadosi (music)
Ballard Macdonald (words)
New York: Shapiro, Bernstein and Co. (1916)
OCLC 20120860

- "On The Same Old Road"

Al Piantadosi (music)
John H. Flynn, Allan J. Flynn (words)
New York: Al Piantadosi & Co., Inc. (1916)
OCLC 63763380

- "If You Had All The World And Its Gold"

Al Piantadosi (music)
Bartley Costello, Harry Edelheit (words)
New York: Al Piantadosi & Co., Inc. (1916)
OCLC 861077035 (pdf copy at the LOC)

- "Baby Shoes"

Al Piantadosi (music)
Joe Goodwin (1889–1943), Ed Rose (words)
New York: Shapiro, Bernstein & Co. (1916)
William Austin Starmer (cover art)
OCLC 54976065 (pdf copy at the LOC)

- "Send Me Away with a Smile"

Al Piantadosi (words & music)
New York: A. Piantadosi (1917)
William Austin Starmer (cover art)
OCLC 20120219 (pdf copy at the LOC)

- "Someone Is Waiting For You"

Al Piantadosi (words & music)
New York: A. Piantadosi & Co. Inc. (1917)
OCLC 20120289

- "For France and Liberty"

Al Piantadosi (music)
John H. Flynn, Allan J. Flynn (words)
New York: Al Piantados & Co. (1917)
OCLC 63161466, 915089461 (pdf copy at the LOC)

- "Wild, Wild Women Are Making a Wild Man of Me"

Al Piantadosi (music)
Henry Lewis, Al Wilson (words)
New York: Al. Piantadosi & Co. Inc. (1917)
OCLC 20120239 (pdf copy at the LOC)

- "All Aboard for Home Sweet Home"

Al Piantadosi, Jack Glogau (né Jacob A. Glogau; 1886–1953) (music)
Addison Burkhardt (words)
New York: Al. Piantadosi & Co (1918)
OCLC 20119198

- From the 1918 musical farce Who Stole The Hat

Conceived and staged by Jack Mason

1. "They're The Stars In Our Service Flag"
  Jack Glogau (né Jacob A. Glogau; 1886–1953) (music)
  Jack Mason, Al Piantadosi (words)
  New York: Al. Piantadosi & Co. (1918)
  OCLC 498691361, 726914751
2. "My Salvation Army Girl"
  Al Piantadosi (music)
  Jack Mason (words)
  New York: Al. Piantadosi & Co. (1918)
  OCLC 55722298, 726923786 (pdf copy at the LOC)
- "Belgium Dry Your Tears"

Al Piantadosi (music)
Arthur Freed (words)
Sachs (cover art)
New York: Al Piantadosi & Co (1918)
OCLC 18776251 (pdf copy at the LOC)

- "I'm Making a Study of Beautiful Girls" ("And I'm Still In My A B C's")

From Ziegfeld's Follies
Al Piantadosi, Jack Glogau (née Jacob A. Glogau; 1886–1953) (music)
Eddie Cantor (words)
New York: Al Piantadosi & Co (1918)
(pdf copy at the LOC)

- "What An Army Of Men We'd Have If They Ever Drafted The Girls"

Jack Glogau (né Jacob A. Glogau; 1886–1953), Al Piantadosi (words & music)
New York: Al. Piantadosi and Co. Inc. (1918)
OCLC 853605133

- "The Woman Thou Gavest Me"

(from the 1919 film of the same title, directed by Ford)
Al Piantadosi (words & music)
New York: Al. Piantadosi and Co. Inc. (1919)
OCLC 726905253

- "Rose of the Evening"

Al Piantadosi (music)
Nils T. Granlund (words)
May Singhi Breen (ukulele accompaniment)
New York: Leo Feist (1920)
OCLC 26007241

- "Pal of My Cradle Days"

Al Piantadosi (music)
Marshall Montgomery (pseudonym of "Marshall Albert Smith) (words)
May Singhi Breen (arranger of ukulele accompaniment)
New York: Leo Feist (1925)
OCLC 18697981

- "Behind These Gray Walls"

Carson Robison (music)
Ed. Lovey (pseudonym of Al Piantadosi) (words)
New York: Shapiro, Bernstein & Co. (1926)
OCLC 843995559

- "I've Got The Stock Market Blues"

Al Piantadosi, Jack Glogau (né Jacob A. Glogau; 1886–1953) (words & music)
Ralph Colicchio (1896–1966)
© April 10, 1929

- "My Stormy Weather Pal"

Al Piantadosi (words & music)
Al Piantadosi (1929)

- "A Whistle Girl At A Whistle Stop"

Jean Schwartz, Dick Coburn, Al Piantadosi (words & music)
(1948)

== Cover art ==
Cover artists

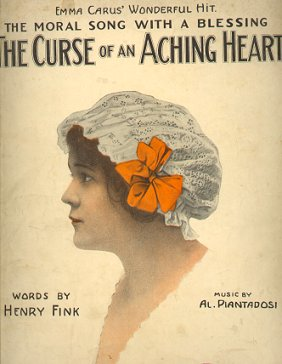
(artist unknown)

Rosenbaum Studios

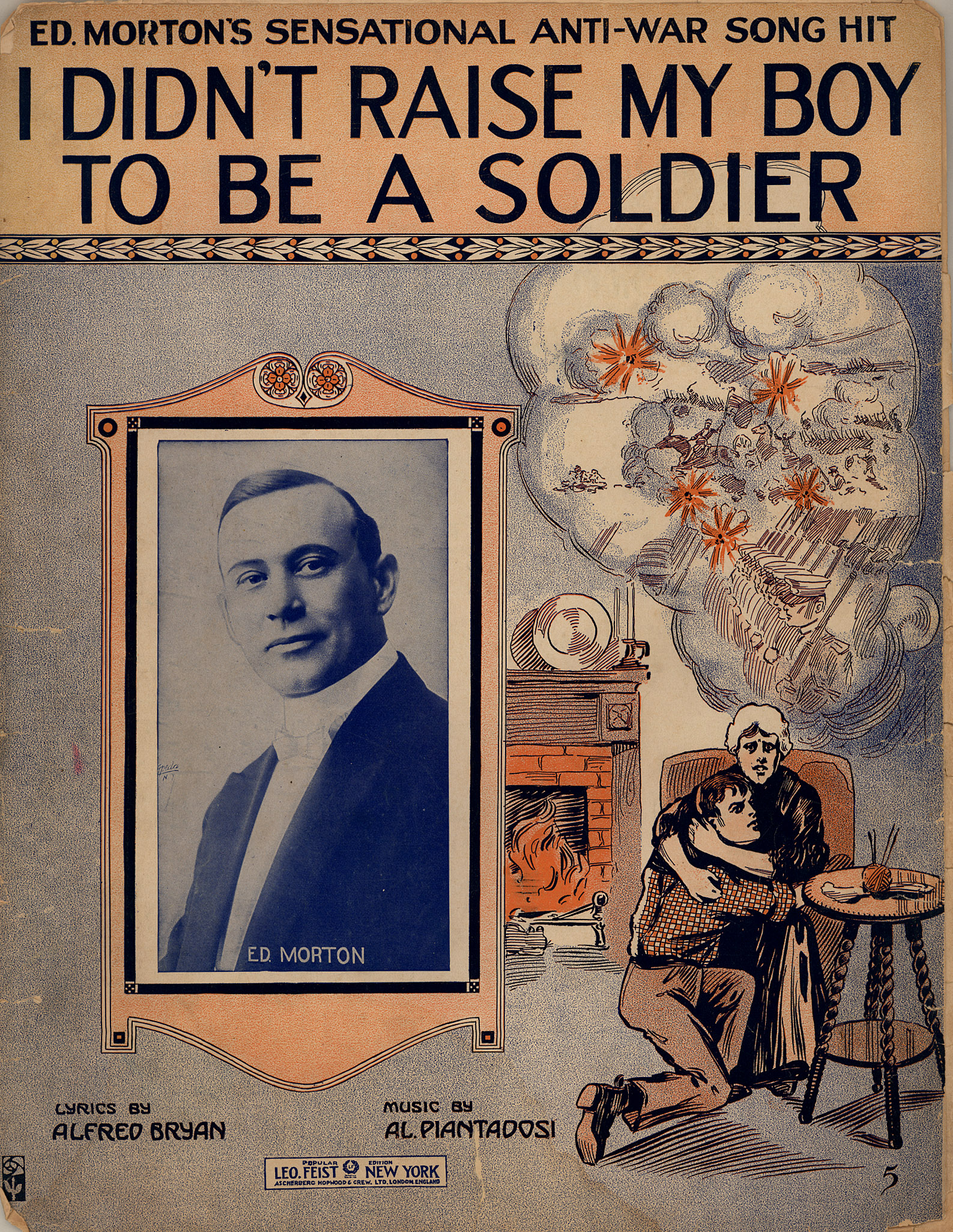
Rosenbaum Studios

== Selected recordings ==
- Sinatra Swings (Swing Along With Me) (album) (1961) (audio on YouTube)

Frank Sinatra with the Billy May Orchestra
Reprise FS 1002
"Curse of an Aching Heart," arranged by Billy May
OCLC 476661867

- "Pal of My Cradle Days" (45 rpm single) (1981) (audio on YouTube)

Ann Breen (vocalist), Homespun Records HS 52
Re-released 2002 (CD) by Castle Pulse/Sanctuary Records
OCLC 68566790

== Pseudonyms of Piantadosi ==
- Ed. Lovey – "Ed." was likely an abbreviation for the given name of his wife, Edna Hannah Robinson (maiden; 1889–1962); "Lovey" was the maiden name of his wife's mother, Bertha (née Lovey; 1858–1936)
- A.P.

== Family ==
Al Piantadosi's nephew, Arthur Piantadosi (1916–1994), was a sound engineer, notably for motion pictures in Hollywood.
