= Joe Jackson Sr. =

Austrian cycling champion and clown (1873–1942)

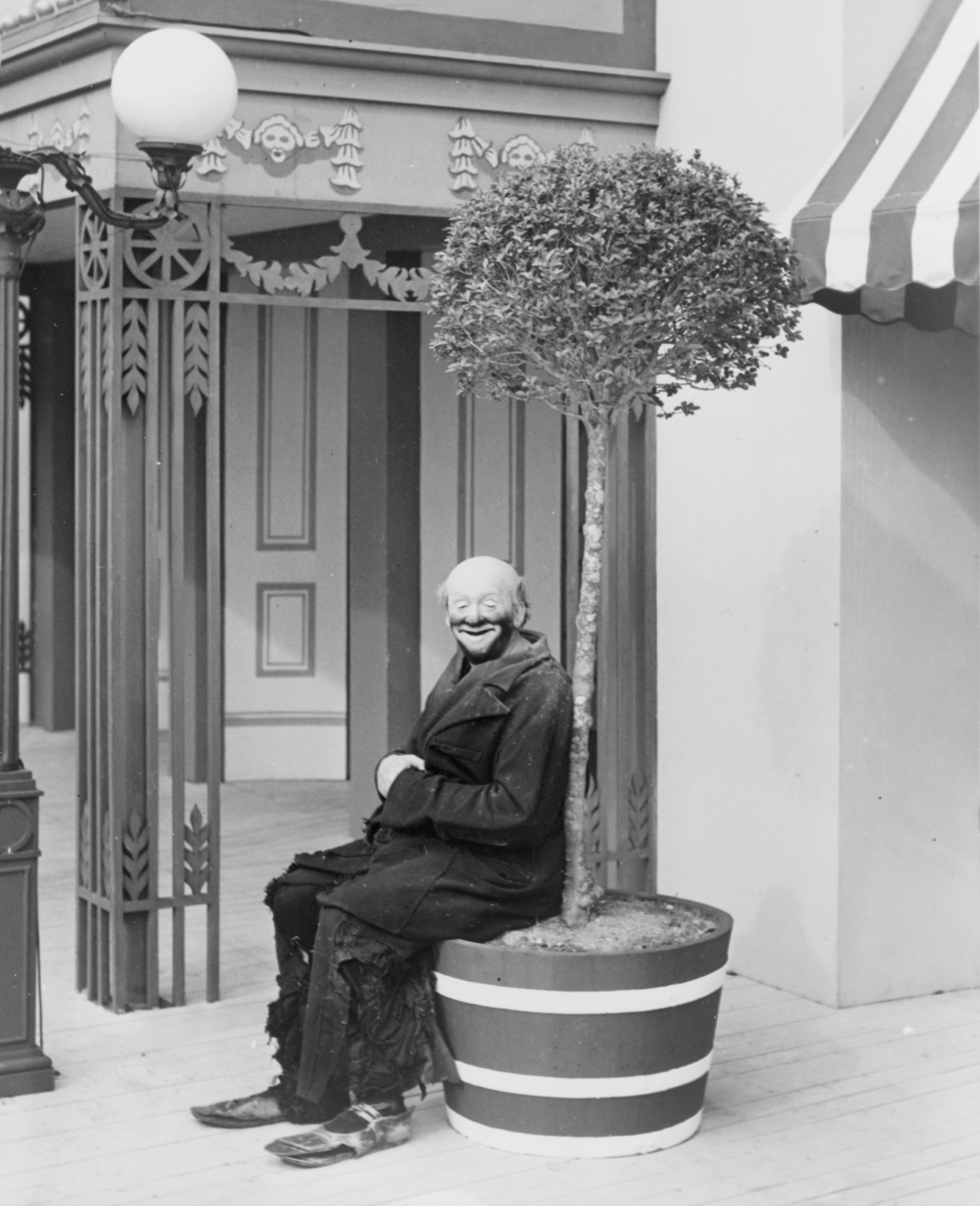
Jackson in 1940

Joe Jackson Sr. (born Joseph Francis Jiranek; 1873–1942) was an Austrian cycling champion and a member of a world champion bicycle polo team before he became an entertainer.

Born in Vienna, Jackson became a champion racing cyclist at an early age. Later he became a trick bicycle rider and traveled over much of Europe. While appearing at the Crystal Palace in London, the handlebars of his bicycle came off. He waved the handlebars wildly as a gesture of despair. The laughs from the audience brought down the house and it gave Jackson the idea for his famous act. From then on he was a comedian. In all his years on the stage, Jackson did his act in pantomime. Preferring intimate settings, Jackson worked almost exclusively in vaudeville and European one-ring circuses. His act took him to England, Europe, Russia, Siberia, Turkey, and the United States. During the New York World's Fair, he appeared in the American Jubilee. Shortly afterward, he opened a restaurant and resort in Bellvale, New York, where he made his home. In his late years he devoted most of his time to managing his eatery, making only infrequent stage appearances, mostly in New York, when he felt like it. He was also a capable magician.

He encouraged his son to take over the act. Junior did the exact routine with every gesture exactly as done by his father. During a recent (to that time) run at the Music Hall, Junior substituted for his father for one performance and nobody knew the difference. Junior carried on the act in Los Angeles with the Ice Capades.

Following a performance at New York City's Roxy Theater, on May 16, 1942, he took five curtain calls; he turned to Buck Wheeler, the Roxy stage manager, and said "They're still applauding." Then he walked over to the backstage elevator and, while applause was still being heard, died of a heart attack. He was inducted into The International Clown Hall of Fame in 1994.

He was married to Maria 'Rialto' Truccot Prols, a former singer, who ran Mother Rialto's tavern in Bellvale with him and their later daughter-in-law.
