= New York Hippodrome =

Former theater in New York CIty

- The New York Hippodrome theater on Sixth Avenue, Manhattan c. 1909

General information
- Status: Demolished
- Classification: Theater
- Location: Manhattan, New York City, United States
- Coordinates: 40.7558°N 73.9833°W
- Completed: 1905
- Demolished: 1939

Design and construction
- Architects: Frederic Thompson and Jay Herbert Morgan
- Main contractor: contractor: Frederick Thompson and Elmer Dundy construction firm: George A. Fuller Company

Other information
- Seating capacity: 5,300

The Hippodrome Theatre, also called the New York Hippodrome, was a theater located on Sixth Avenue between West 43rd and West 44th Streets in the Theater District of Midtown Manhattan in New York City. The theater operated from 1905 to 1939 and was called the world's largest theater by its builders, with a seating capacity of 5,300 and a stage measuring 100 by 200 feet (30 m × 61 m). It had state-of-the-art theatrical technology, including a tank built into the stage apron that could be filled with water for aquatic performances.

The Hippodrome was built by Frederic Thompson and Elmer "Skip" Dundy, creators of the Luna Park amusement park on Coney Island, with the backing of Harry S. Black's U.S. Realty, a dominant real estate and construction company of the time, and was acquired by The Shubert Organization in 1909. It became the stage for Billy Rose's Jumbo in 1935. Acts which appeared at the Hippodrome included numerous circuses, musical revues, Harry Houdini's disappearing elephant, vaudeville, religious meetings, political rallies, and sporting events.

The theater closed in August 1939, and a modern office tower known as The Hippodrome Center (1120 Avenue of the Americas) opened on the site in 1952.

== Construction ==
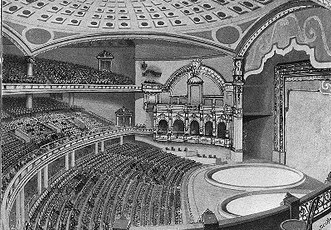
The interior of the Hippodrome

Construction of the Hippodrome began in June 1904, with Frederick Thompson and Jay H. Morgan as architects, and the Fuller Company as the general contractor. Finishing touches were still being put in place days before the April 12, 1905 opening. With a seating capacity of 5,300, almost twice that of the Metropolitan Opera's 3,000 seats, the gargantuan building is still considered one of the true wonders of theater architecture. Its stage was 12 times larger than any Broadway "legit" house and was capable of holding as many as 1,000 performers at a time, or a full-sized circus with elephants and horses – who could be housed in built-in stalls under the stage. It also had a 14-foot (4.3 m) high, 60-foot (18 m) diameter, 8,000-gallon tank built into the stage apron that could be filled with water for swimming and diving shows.

The exterior of the red-brick and terra-cotta building was Moorish in style, with two corner towers, each of which was topped by a globe covered in electric lights.

A clip of Panorama from the Times Building, New York 1905, Bryant Park (and NYPL Building under construction) and Hippodrome Theater and Algonquin Hotel(upper-left corner behind the theater)

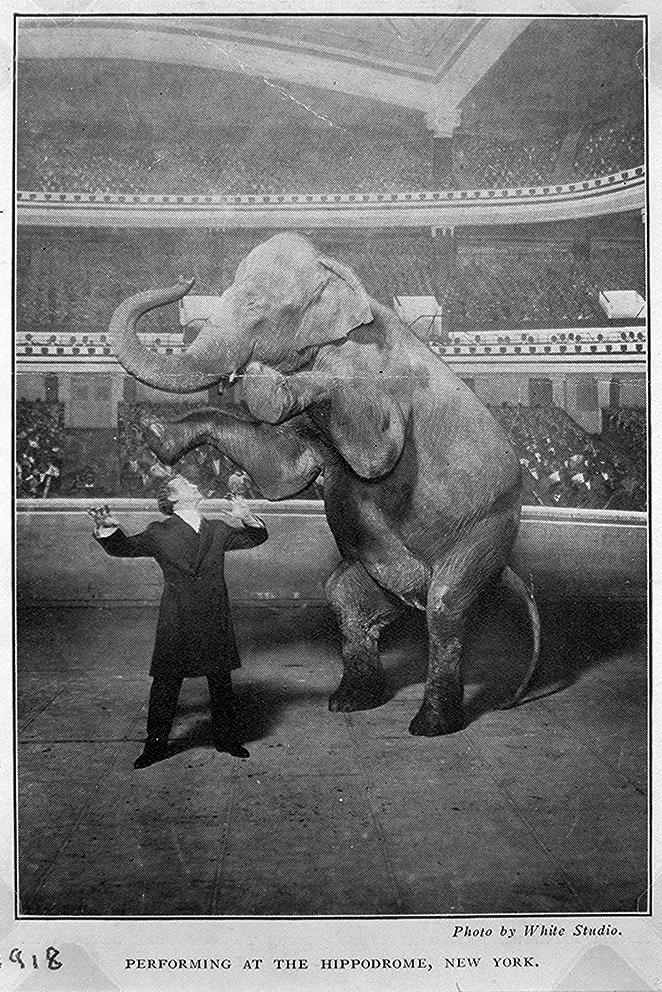
Harry Houdini and Jennie the elephant performing at the Hippodrome

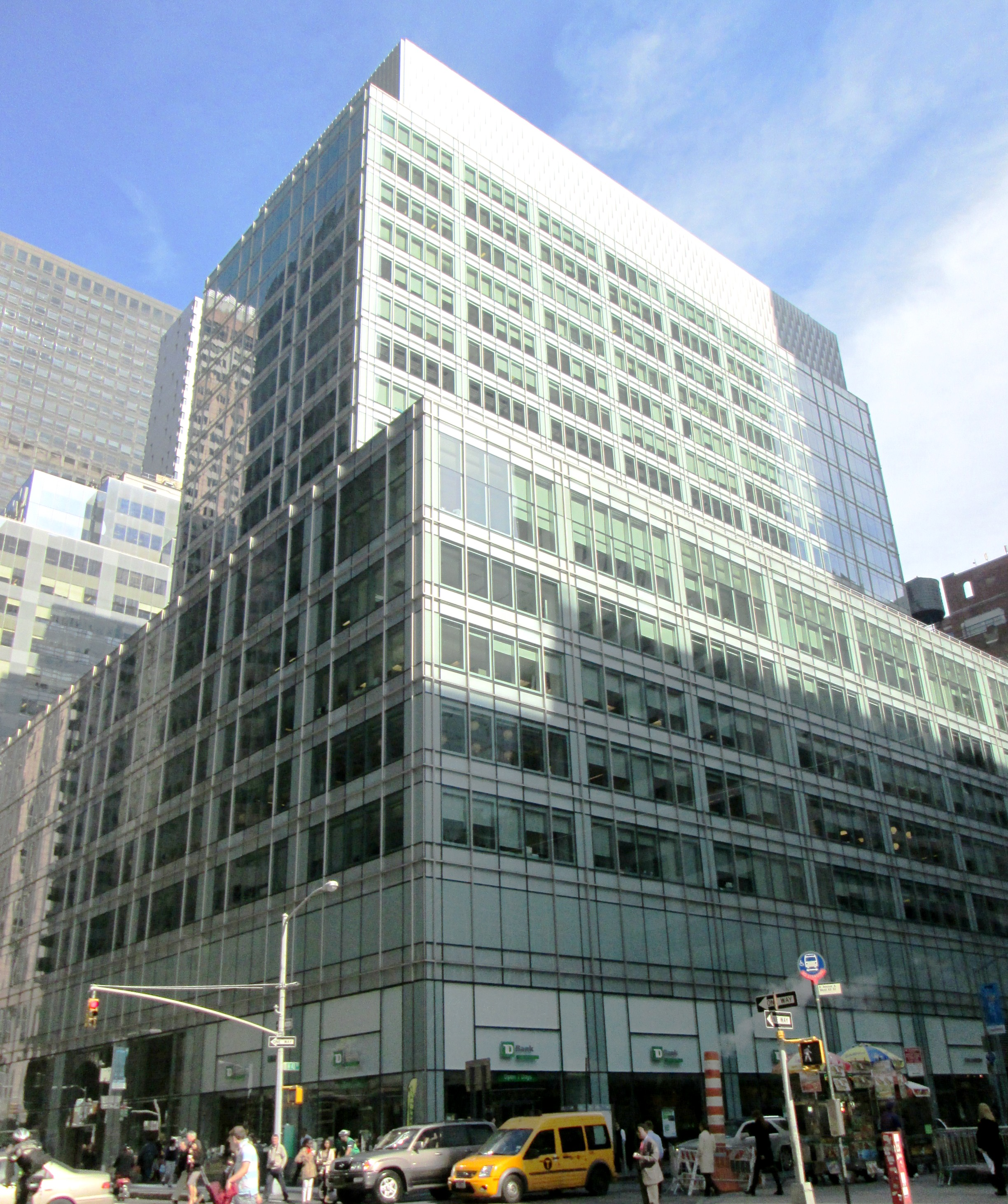
The Hippodrome Building, built in 1951–52, at 1120 Avenue of the Americas (Sixth Avenue), designed by Kahn & Jacobs

== Opening ==
The gala opening on April 12, 1905, was completely sold out, with seats being priced at as little as 25 cents in the theater's "Family Circle", while others had been auctioned off for as much as $575. The performance was a four-hour extravaganza, the first act of which was called A Yankee Circus on Mars, which featured space ships, horses, elephants, acrobats, clowns – including the noted Spanish clown Marceline – a baboon named Coco, an orchestra of 60, hundreds of singers, and 150 dancers performing to Ponchielli's Dance of the Hours. The second act was Andersonville, about the notorious Confederate military prison where many Union soldiers were maltreated. The spectacle depicted the Union raid on the camp, with gunfire, explosions and cavalry troops on horseback swimming across the huge water tank simulating a lake.

== The glory years ==
Under the direction of Charles Dillingham, the Hippodrome was the largest and most successful theater in New York. The Hippodrome featured lavish spectacles complete with circus animals, diving horses, opulent sets, and 500-member choruses. Until the end of World War I, the Hippodrome housed all sorts of spectacles then switched to musical extravaganzas, including Good Times which ran for 456 performances from 1920 to 1921. and Better Times, which ran for 405 performance in 1922–23 When Dillingham left in 1923 to pursue other interests, the Hippodrome was leased to Keith-Albee, which hired architect Thomas W. Lamb to turn it into a vaudeville theater by building a much smaller stage and discarding all of its unique features. The most popular vaudeville artists of the day, including illusionist Harry Houdini, performed at the Hippodrome during its heyday. Others might vanish rabbits, but in 1918, on the brightly lit stage of the Hippodrome, Houdini made a 10,000-pound elephant disappear, creating a sensation.

The Hippodrome's huge running costs made it a perennial financial failure, and a series of producers tried and failed to make money from the theater. It became a location for vaudeville productions in 1923 before being leased for budget opera performances, then finally becoming a sports arena.

== Decline and fall ==
In 1922, the elephants that graced the stage of the Hippodrome since its opening moved uptown to the Bronx's Royal Theater. On arrival, stage worker Miller Renard recalled, the elephants were greeted with extraordinary fanfare:

The next day the Borough President gives them a dinner on the lawn of the Chamber of Commerce up on Tremont Avenue, with special dinner menus for the elephants. It was some show to see all those elephants march up those steps to the table where each elephant had a bale of hay. The[n], the Borough President welcomes the elephants to the Bronx, and the place is just mobbed with people. And that was the worst week's business we ever done in that theatre.

In 1925, movies were added to the vaudeville, but within a few years, competition from the newer and more sumptuous movie palaces in the Broadway-Times Square area forced Keith-Albee-Orpheum, which was merged into RKO by May 1928, to sell the theater. Several attempts to use the Hippodrome for plays and operas failed, and it remained dark until 1935, when producer Billy Rose leased it for his spectacular Rodgers & Hart circus musical Jumbo, which received favorable reviews but lasted only five months due to the Great Depression.

After that, the Hippodrome sputtered through bookings of late-run movies, boxing, wrestling, and jai alai games, then was demolished in 1939 as the value of real estate on Sixth Avenue began to escalate. It closed on August 16, 1939, and was demolished. World War II delayed re-development, and the Hippodrome site remained vacant for over a decade.

== Legacy ==
The office building and parking garage built on the site in 1951–52, owned by Edison Properties, uses the name "The Hippodrome Center." Through the 1960s, the modern building was the corporate headquarters of the Charter Communications media publishing company.

== Selected shows ==
- A Yankee Circus on Mars and The Raiders (1905)
- A Society Circus (1905)
- Pioneer Days and Neptune's Daughter (1906)
- The Auto Race (1907)
- Sporting Days (1908)
- A Trip to Japan (1909)
- The International Cup, the Ballet of Niagara, and the Earthquake (1910)
- Around the World (1912)
- Under Many Flags (1912)
- America (1913)
- Wars of the World (1915)
- Hip! Hip! Hooray! (1915)
- The Big Show (1916)
- Cheer Up (1917)
- Everything (1918)
- Happy Days (1919)
- Good Times (1920)
- Get Together (1921)
- Better Times (1922)
- Jumbo (1935)

== In popular culture ==
- In 1915, John Philip Sousa composed a march titled "The New York Hippodrome" commemorating his band's performance run in the Hip Hip Hooray extravaganza at this venue.
- In 1944, in the Leonard Bernstein musical On the Town, Chip isn't aware of its demolition in the number "Come Up to My Place."
- The 1952 film Million Dollar Mermaid has scenes set in the Hippodrome with Esther Williams playing Annette Kellerman in water ballets, Maria Tallchief as Anna Pavlova and Rod Rogers as Marceline.
