= Carajicomedia =

16th-century Spanish poetric work

Carajicomedia (Prick Comedy) is a 16th-century Spanish poetic work of 117 stanzas composed of eight 12-syllable verses. It appeared for the first and only time in print at the end of the Cancionero de obras de burlas provocantes a risa (1519). It is a sexual parody of a little more than a third of Juan de Mena’s very famous but now unfashionable El Laberinto de Fortuna (1444, The Labyrinth of Fortune), an allegorical vision poem written in very Latinate language. The text parodied, however, is actually the first printing of Hernán Núñez's edition of El Laberinto entitled Las Trezientas (1499), because Carajicomedia, not only parodies Mena's poem, but also Núñez's prologue and notes.

In the original work, a poet asks why good men often come to bad ends. The goddess Bellona leads him to Heaven, where he sees three different versions of the Wheel of Fortune, respectively representing the past, the present, and the future. In the parody version, a knight faces the problems of old age and impotence. He goes on a quest to regain his virility, and the goddess Luxuria leads him to a whorehouse in Valladolid. Despite the efforts of a witch and an old woman to restore his virility through masturbation, the knight never regains his past virility or his youth. The knight eventually contemplates the nature and effect of lust.

The actual authors of the parody poem are unknown, though the personas of Fray Bugeo Montesino and Fray Juan de Hempudia are the purported authors. The poem is thought to mockingly depict Ferdinand II of Aragon and the regent Francisco Jiménez de Cisneros, and the authors likely feared retribution. The exact time of the parody's composition is unknown, but its political allusions point to a time when the infirm Joanna of Castile had already inherited the Castilian throne. There were conflicts over who would be Castile's regent, and the parody covertly alludes to the factional struggles of Joanna's reign. Along with other Spanish satirical works, reprints of the Carajicomedia were prohibited by the original version of the Index Librorum Prohibitorum (1559). Its first reprint version appeared in 1841.

== The model and the parody ==
=== The model ===
El Laberinto begins with Mena wondering why God allows good men to often come to bad ends. To answer his doubts, the goddess Bellona takes the dreaming poet to meet with Divina Providencia in Heaven, who points to the insufficiency of the human intellect to understand God's designs. Divina Providencia then takes Mena to Fortune's house and identifies the historical and mythological figures that he sees attached to two of three great Wheels that represent the past, present, and future. Each of these wheels is divided into seven circles, and each circle is ruled by one of the seven planets and exemplifies one of the Seven Virtues. Divina Providencia does a particularly lengthy review of contemporary Spanish knights who have met their death gloriously or ingloriously in the circle of Mars (Fortitude) and, together with the stanzas devoted to Jupiter (Iustitia) and Saturn (Prudentia), these stanzas reveal by their length that Mena favors those Virtues that he considers appropriate for the king and his knights to embody in order to re-engage in the Reconquista.

=== The parody ===
The parody, which appeared some seventy-five years after Mena's poem and twenty-seven years after the end of the Granada War in 1492, has nothing to do with either El Laberinto's objectives or its Latinate language. Carajicomedia tells the story of an impotent knight named Diego Fajardo and his quest to regain his sexual vigor in shockingly plain Castilian. It is divided into two poems that are based on different sections of El Laberinto and attributed to different mock authors. The parodic author of the first poem (stanzas 1-92), Fray Bugeo Montesino (a parody of Fray Ambrosio Montesino), introduces Fajardo; then, the aged knight tells his story in his own voice and asks the goddess Luxuria to grant him a potion to restore his lost virility. Stanzas 7-91 then describe how a silent goddess Luxuria appears to Fajardo as an old whore—a madam and a witch called La Zamorana—to take him to Valladolid, where another old woman, María de Vellasco, offers to help him regain his potency. She then grabs Fajardo by his exposed member and leads him to Valladolid’s public whorehouse, where, instead of Heaven, he has a vision of some thirty-six whores from all over the world. These whores, which represent only a small fraction of the two thousand he has "known," serve to remind him of his former sexual prowess and contrast with the exemplars of El Laberinto.

After enduring La Zamorana and María’s attempts to revive his penis through masturbation and acknowledging that whores now inspire him with fear, Fajardo looks at his still-exposed genitals and has a second vision of some thirty-five additional whores, who belong to the Orders of the Moon and Venus. Between these two hallucinations, he instructs his penis on how it should conduct itself with whores and comments on how impotence affects everyone in old age.

Towards the end, Fajardo stumbles onto a battle between armies of personified cunts and penises. María de Vellasco advises him to ignore the clash, because one of its leaders is a prominent cuckold, and it is too dangerous to speak about him. Fajardo takes her advice and ruminates instead on the nature and effect of lust on men. He concludes by saying that even the “knowledge” imparted by his guide is insufficient to undo the enmity of Luxuria. Fray Bugeo then reassumes the role of narrator to utter a mock apology for his work’s obscene nature and comment on the pervasiveness of lust in the world.

Altogether, the first poem dedicates 37 of its 92 stanzas to describing his visions of naked prostitutes, whose stories are often amplified by prose glosses that parody those in Las Trezientas. In contrast, the much shorter second poem (stanzas 93-117), which is probably by a different anonymous author although it is attributed to Fray Juan de Hempudia, does not allude to any specific whores. Instead, it is based on El Laberinto’s account of the tragic death of one of the great heroes of the Reconquest, Enrique Pérez de Guzmán, second Count of Niebla, who drowned during a sea-assault on the castle of Gibraltar with eight of his men. Carajicomedia turns this siege into a mock-attack of a horde of personified penises led by Diego Fajardo on a whorehouse defended by a bevy of cunts. The attack ends when his army of pricks is “drowned” by (i.e. “in”) the cunts.

== Authorship ==
Carajicomedia is devoid of clues about the identity of its authors, but they must have been retainers of a great lord. However, even to the casual reader, it is obvious that those responsible for the first poem have a thorough education. The two poems (and prose glosses) are also more polished and sophisticated than the typical burlesque compositions of the Cancionero general, which most often carry the names of their authors. Why therefore is it anonymous? The answer must have something to do with its targets.

Although the work is concerned with the growing absolutism of kings; the encroachment of foreign interests in Castile; and the factional struggles that were then dividing the country, these are not reasons enough to account for its anonymity. After all, it is purportedly about an unthreatening lowly knight called Diego Fajardo and unimportant whores. Carajicomedia's initial rubric, however, describes the work as “eſpeculatiua,” an adjective that ultimately derives from the Latin noun speculum (mirror, see speculum literature) through the verb speculārī (observe, consider, examine) and the late-Latin adjective speculātīvus (speculative). The rubric therefore mockingly suggests that the work is like a mirror whose scrutiny reveals hidden truths in its shadows about the identity of its characters: If Fray Bugeo Montesino and Fray Juan de Hempudia are and are not its authors, then Diego Fajardo, María de Vellasco, Santilario, and others may not be who they appear to be.

In reality, the shadows in the mirror reveal some of the most prominent people in the realm, among them King Ferdinand II of Aragon and Cardinal/Regent Francisco Jiménez de Cisneros. Therein lies the real reason for Carajicomedia's false attribution of its authorship to Fray Bugeo Montesino and Fray Juan de Hempudia. The authors fear retribution for committing a crime of lèse majesté by mocking powerful individuals.

== Time of composition ==
Joanna of Castile, who was queen of Castile between 1504 and 1555, inherited the throne after the deaths of her mother’s two older children and their heirs. However, she was considered by many to be subject to a malady that has been variously described as a depressive disorder, a psychosis, or a case of inherited schizophrenia, and therefore unfit to rule by herself.

Isabella I of Castile's last will dealt with her daughter's infirmity by making Ferdinand II of Aragon Regent of Castile. Joanna’s husband, Philip the Handsome, not surprisingly, objected to this arrangement and forced Ferdinand to leave Castile. To balance the political scales, Ferdinand had married Germaine of Foix but, the marriage proved unnecessary because Philip subsequently died under suspicious circumstances. The task of governing again came to rest in the hands of Ferdinand and, at his death, was inherited by Cardinal Francisco Jiménez de Cisneros.

According to Frank A. Domínguez, Carajicomedia was written between the deaths of Ferdinand II, who was Regent during the minority of his grandson, Charles I of Spain, and his successor in that office, Cardinal Francisco Jiménez de Cisneros. These events and time period are those reflected in Carajicomedia.

== Textual and critical history ==
The Cancionero de obras de burlas provocantes a risa disappeared from sight until it was republished anonymously in 1841 and again in 1843 by Luis de Usoz, a Quaker then residing in London. The few individuals who read his edition found Carajicomedia so offensive that they barely recorded its existence. Without naming the work, Marcelino Menéndez Pelayo called it “the most extensive and brutal composition of the Cancionero de burlas," dismissively adding that it holds some interest for the study of the continuations of the Tragicomedia of Fernando de Rojas and the history of prostitution at the beginning of the 16th century. Scholars like Antonio Rodríguez-Moñino wondered how it could ever have been printed, and Erasmo Buceta considered it to be one of the two most obscene poems in Castilian literature (the other being the Pleyto del manto, "The Lawsuit over the Cloak/Blanket").

Carajicomedia did not fare much better in the following decades. The Cancionero de obras de burlas prouocãtes a risa was reprinted by Soler in facsimile (Valencia 1951), but it received little attention until it was edited by Pablo Jauralde Pou and Juan Bellón Cazabán (1974), and by Frank A. Domínguez (1978). Since then, Carajicomedia has been published independently by Carlos Varo (1981) and Álvaro Alonso (1995), and Frank A. Domínguez (2015). It has also become part of modern anthologies of erotic poetry that aim to make such texts more accessible to the general reading public.

For a long time Carajicomedia did not have much of a critical impact. It is not mentioned in works on pornography and erotica. It is also absent from books and essays on medieval and early modern Spanish satire, including Kenneth Scholberg’s Sátira e invectiva en la España medieval (1971, Satire and Invective in Medieval Spain) or in his Algunos aspectos de la sátira en el siglo XVI (1979, Some Aspects of Satire in the XVIth Century). It is also not mentioned in Laura Kendrick’s Medieval Satire (2007, 52-69), Alberta Gatti’s Satire in the Spanish Golden Age (2007, 86-100), or included in newer overviews on sensual love, such as the Encyclopedia of Erotic Literature of Gaëtan Brulotte and John Phillips (2006). Unwittingly, scholars like Menéndez Pelayo, Rodríguez-Moñino, and Buceta have reinforced the false notion, first stated by Henry Spenser Ashbee in the nineteenth century, that early Spanish burlesque poetry was unimportant, and that few erotic works appeared in Spain's presses at any time (Centuria librorum absconditorum 402-403, Bibliography of Forbidden Books).

As a consequence of this neglect, the first serious article devoted to Carajicomedia only appeared in 1975. In it, Alfonso Canales identified the protagonist, Diego Fajardo, as a son of Alonso Fajardo, a knight who was granted a monopoly over the whorehouses of Málaga and Granada by the Catholic Monarchs. Canales therefore conjectured that Carajicomedia might have been composed towards the end of Isabel de Castilla’s reign.

Ten years later, Carlos Varo suggested in his introduction to the first independent edition of Carajicomedia (1981) that all the prostitutes that bear the name Isabel possibly satirize the Queen. This was a tantalizing thought concerning a much revered figure in Castilian history. Faced with a vacuum of research on the work, most critics have grudgingly supported Varo's speculation and assigned Carajicomedia's composition to the end of Isabel de Castilla's reign in 1504. Of late, Frank A. Domínguez (2015) has attributed the work to the interregnum that followed Fernando II de Aragón's death (1516-1519) and preceded the Revolt of the Comuneros (1520).

== Censorship and the Index Librorum Prohibitorum ==
As Juri Lotman and Boris Uspensky have explained, high culture is always looking for ways of erasing from memory texts that it considers dangerous (216). This is true of the burlesque poetry of the Cancionero general. However, although a certain amount of hostility and reproof about Carajicomedia's obscene language and content was to be expected from the religious establishment, its explicit sexuality was really a minor concern in the early modern era.

Nevertheless, early (and disorganized) attempts at its suppression by prudish readers coalesced with the publication of the Index Librorum Prohibitorum (1559, Index of Prohibited Authors and Books), which banned all “burlas” from being published or read. This may explain why the Cancionero de obras de burlas was not reprinted. Its suppression, however, was more because some of its poems mocked religious texts and figures, or portrayed friars unfavorably, and not because its compositions offended sexual mores. Faced with a more organized hostility from the Inquisitorial establishment, it is not surprising that the Cancionero de obras de burlas prouocātes a risa (and Carajicomedia) survives in only one copy (British Library H C.20.b.22).

== Importance ==
Carajicomedia is the most significant satire produced in early Modern Europe before La cazzaria (The Book of the Prick) of Antonio Vignali (Marcantonio Piccolomini). Its risqué nature does not keep it from being among the most complex literary creations of any kind written between Fernando de Rojas's La Tragicomedia de Calisto y Melibea (1499, Tragicomedy of Calisto and Melibea) and Lazarillo de Tormes (1554). One of the earliest works of propaganda, it is an excellent measure of the level of education of the nobility and the upper middle class. Its anti-religious nature makes it unlike most of the works that are consecrated by the Spanish literary tradition. It is one of the clearest reflections extant of Christian attitudes towards conversos, women, and the auto de fe. It is also one of the earliest manifestations of the controversy between Castilian and Latinizing or Italianizing poets, and the first occurrence of a narrative device in which an author, the glossator in this case, claims to be correcting a previously existing version of a story written by another character, Fray Bugeo, while adding his own material. In other words, it partakes of the same narrative game that has been heretofore associated with Miguel de Cervantes’s narrator in Don Quijote and the false Arab historian Cide Hamete Benengeli.

== Modern editions ==
Anon. Cancionero de obras de burlas prouocātes a risa. [Facsimile of the edition of 1519.] Valencia: Soler, 1951.

Anon. Cancionero de obras de burlas provocantes a risa. Edited by Frank Domínguez. Valencia: Soler [Albatros], 1978.

Anon. Carajicomedia. Edited by Álvaro Alonso. Málaga: Aljibe, 1995.

Anon. Carajicomedia. Edited by Carlos Varo. Madrid: Playor, 1981.

Domínguez, Frank A. Carajicomedia: Parody and Satire in Early Modern Spain, with and Edition and Translation of the Text. (London and Rochester: Tamesis, 2015). Paleographic (pp. 235-353) and modern editions with a translation into English (pp. 355-451).

== Sources ==
- Alonso, Álvaro. "Comentando a Juan de Mena: Hernán Núñez y los humanistas italianos." Confronto letterario: Quaderni del Dipartimento di Lingue e Letterature Straniere Moderne dell'Università di Pavia 37 (2002): 7-18.
- Alonso Asenjo, Julio. "Notas a la glosa de la copla xxviii de la Carajicomedia." Lemir 14 (2010): 1-27.
- Arbizu-Sabater, Victoria. "Paratexto sexual y sátira misógina en Carajicomedia." Scriptura 19-20 (2008): 37–56.
- Asís Garrote, María Dolores de. "Discípulos y amigos del comendador Hernán Núñez." Humanismo y pervivencia del mundo clásico 4.5 (2010): 2575–2582.
- ---. Hernán Núñez en la historia de los estudios clásicos. Madrid: Sáez, 1977.
- Balcells, José María. "Parodia sobre parodia: las dos Carajicomedias. Expresiones de la cultura y el pensamiento medievales." Medievalia 34 (2010): 399–411.
- Brocato, Linde M. "‘Tened por espejo su fin,’ Mapping Gender and Sex in Fifteenth- and Sixteenth Century Spain." In Queer Iberia. Durham and London: Duke University Press, 1999. 325-365.
- Canales, Alfonso. "Sobre la identidad del actante (léase protagonista) de la Carajicomedia." Papeles de Son Armadans 80 (1975): 73–81.
- Domínguez, Frank A. "Carajicomedia and Fernando el Católico’s Body: The Identities of Diego Fajardo and María de Vellasco." Bulletin of Hispanic Studies 84 (2007): 725–744.
- ---. "Monkey Business in Carajicomedia: The Parody of Fray Ambrosio Montesino as Fray Bugeo." eHumanista 7 (2006): 1-27.
- ---. "La parodia del traductor en Carajicomedia: Fray Bugeo Montesino y Fray Juan de Hempudia." Edited by Roxana Recio. Cultura y Humanismo: la traducción de los siglos XIV al XVII. Valladolid: Universidad de Valladolid, 2007.
- ---. "Santilario and Cardinal Francisco Jiménez de Cisneros: Stanza 28 of Carajicomedia and its Gloss." La corónica: A Journal of Medieval Spanish Language and Literature 37.1 (2008): 301–37.
- Duque, Adriano. "The Semiotics of Insult in the Carajicomedia." Recuerde el alma dormida: Medieval and Early Modern Essays in Honor of Frank Domínguez. Edited by John K. Moore and Adriano Duque. Newark: Juan de la Cuesta, 2009. 95-106.
- Lacarra Lanz, Eukene. "Voces autoriales en la Carajicomedia." In Dones i literatura: entre l'Edat Mitjana i el Renaixement. Edited by Ricardo Bellveser. Barcelona: 2012. 117–158.
- Méndez Cabrera, Jerónimo. "Entorn dels topònims urbans de la València de 1519 a la Carajicomedia: l’espai de la paròdia." In XXXII Col·loqui de la societat d’onomàstica d’Algemesí. Societat d'Onomàstica: butlletí interior 108-109 (2008): 389–398.
- Montañés, Luis. “La Carajicomedia: avatares bibliográficos de un texto maldito.” Cuadernos de bibliofilia 9 (1982): 35–52.
- Pérez-Romero, Antonio. ‘The Carajicomedia: The Erotic Urge and the Deconstruction of Idealist Language in the Spanish Renaissance.’ Hispanic Review 71.1 (2003): 67–88.
- Puerto Moro, Laura. “Sobre el contexto literario e ideológico de La Carajicomedia.” Atalaya: Revue d’études médiévales romanes 12 (2011).
- Ramón Palerm, Vicente M. “Uso y abuso satírico de la tradición clásica en la Carajicomedia.” Fortunatae: Revista canaria de filología, cultura y humanidades clásicas 21 (2010): 189–198.
- Rivera Cordero, Victoria. “The Savage Imperium: Masculinity, Subversion and Violence in Carajicomedia.” Romance Notes 49.1 (2009): 43–51.
- Weissberger, Barbara F. “Male Sexual Anxiety in the Cancioneros: A Response.” In Poetry at Court in Trastamaran Spain. Edited by Michael Gerli and Julian Weiss. Tempe, AZ: Arizona Center for Medieval and Renaissance Studies, 1998. 221–34.
