= Hernán Núñez =

Spanish humanist, classicist, philologist, and paremiographer (AD 1475–1553)

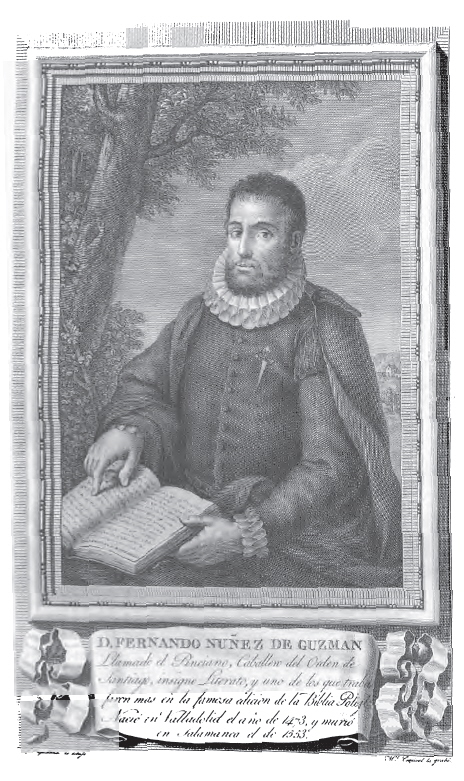
Hernán Núñez de Guzmán

Hernán Núñez de Toledo y Guzmán (Valladolid, 1475 - Salamanca, 1553) was a Spanish humanist, classicist, philologist, and paremiographer. He was called el Comendador Griego, el Pinciano (from Pintia, the Latin name of Valladolid) or Fredenandus Nunius Pincianus. He earned his degree in 1490 from the Spanish College of San Clemente in Bologna. He returned to Spain in 1498 and served as a preceptor to the Mendoza family in Granada. In this city, he studied classical languages as well as Hebrew and Arabic. Cardinal Gonzalo Ximénez de Cisneros hired him as censor of the cardinal's press at Alcalá de Henares. There, Nuñez worked on the Complutensian Polyglot Bible, specifically on the Septuagint. Nuñez was named professor of rhetoric at the Universidad Complutense, which had recently been founded. He then taught Greek from 1519. During the Castilian War of the Communities, Nuñez sided with the comuneros but avoided execution. He then taught at the University of Salamanca, occupying the post once filled by Antonio de Nebrija. At the age of 50, he retired from teaching to dedicate himself fully to research, although he seems to have still given classes on Hebrew at the University of Salamanca.

== Works ==
Nuñez wrote a gloss on the Laberinto de Fortuna by Juan de Mena, which appeared in two editions (Seville, 1499; and Granada, 1505).

In 1508, he collected and glossed a diverse body of proverbs and adages, first published in Seville. After his death, it was published as Refranes o proverbios en romance (Salamanca, 1555). He included proverbs from many languages, including Catalan, Galician, Portuguese, French, Italian, Asturian, Aragonese, Latin, and Greek. The work was popular: it was reprinted several times, although it suffered censorship (some of its obscene or foreign proverbs were removed). It inspired imitators in Spain and abroad, such as the French work Proverbiorum Vulgarium Libri Tres (1531) and the Italian Opera quale contiene le Dieci Tavole de proverbi (Turin, 1535).

In 1509, he translated into Castilian Enea Silvio Piccolomini's History of Bohemia. In 1519, he published a Greek and Latin text of the letter “To the Christian youths,” written by Saint Basil.

He published critical studies on the works of Pliny the Elder, Theocritus, Seneca, and Pomponius Mela. He also studied the work of Saint Jerome.

== List of works ==
- Glosa sobre las Trezientas de Juan de Mena, Sevilla (1499) y Granada (1505) [Hernán Núñez de Toledo, Las ‘Trezientas’ del famosíssimo poeta Juan de Mena con glosa. Julian Weiss & Antonio Cortijo Ocaña eds. https://web.archive.org/web/20110720075550/http://www.ehumanista.ucsb.edu/projects/Weiss%20Cortijo/].
- L. Annaei Senecae Opera, Basilea, 1529. Se hicieron diez ediciones hasta 1627.
- Observationes Fredenandi Pintiani in loca obscura et depravata Hist. Natur. C. Plinii, Salamanca, 1544.
- Refranes de la lengua castellana, Salamanca, 1555. Hay edición crítica moderna, Refranes o proverbios en romance (1555) de Hernán Núñez. Edición crítica. Madrid, Ediciones Guillermo Blázquez, 2001; 2 vols.
