= Satire =

Literary and art genre with a style of humor based on parody

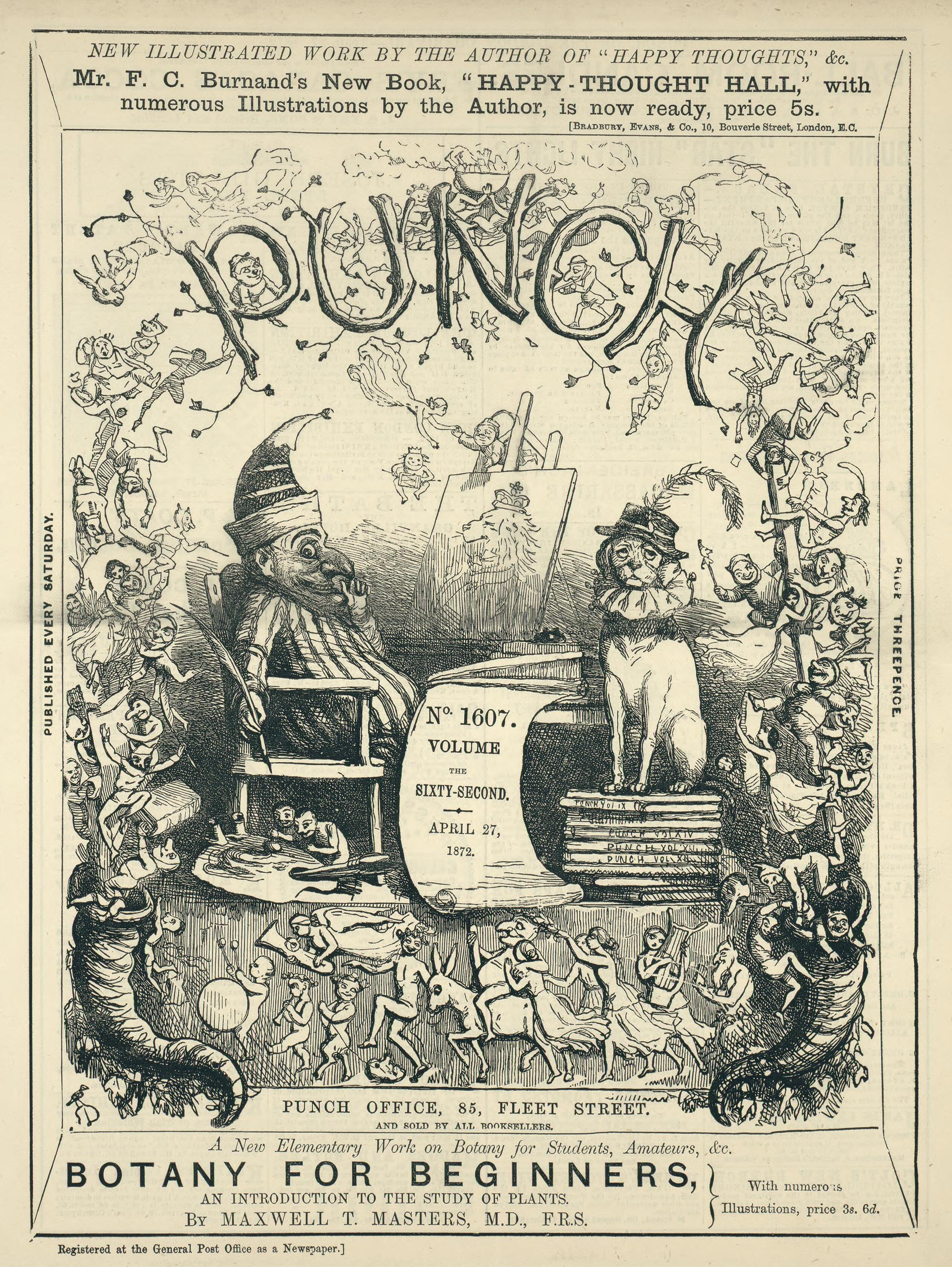
1872 edition of Punch, a ground-breaking British magazine of popular humour, including a great deal of satire of the contemporary, social, and political scene

Satire is a genre of the visual, literary, and performing arts, usually in the form of fiction and less frequently non-fiction, in which vices, follies, abuses, and shortcomings are held up to ridicule, often with the intent of exposing or shaming the perceived flaws of individuals, corporations, government, or society itself into improvement. Although satire is usually meant to be humorous, its greater purpose is often constructive social criticism, using a combination of hyperbole and wit to draw attention to harmful behavior, as well as particular and wider issues in society. Satire may also poke fun at popular themes in art and film.

A prominent feature of satire is strong irony or sarcasm—"in satire, irony is militant", according to literary critic Northrop Frye— but parody, burlesque, exaggeration, juxtaposition, comparison, analogy, and double entendre are all frequently used in satirical speech and writing. This "militant" irony or sarcasm often professes to approve of (or at least accept as natural) the very things the satirist wishes to question.

Satire is found in many artistic forms of expression, including internet memes, literature, plays, commentary, music, film and television shows, and media such as lyrics.

== Etymology and roots ==
The word satire comes from the Latin word satur and the subsequent phrase lanx satura. Satur meant "full", but the juxtaposition with lanx shifted the meaning to "miscellany or medley": the expression lanx satura literally means "a full dish of various kinds of fruits". The use of the word lanx in this phrase, however, is disputed by B.L. Ullman.

The word satura as used by Quintilian, however, was used to denote only Roman verse satire, a strict genre that imposed hexameter form, a narrower genre than what would be later intended as satire. Quintilian famously said that satura, that is a satire in hexameter verses, was a literary genre of wholly Roman origin (satura tota nostra est). He was aware of and commented on Greek satire, but at the time did not label it as such, although today the origin of satire is considered to be Aristophanes' Old Comedy. The first critic to use the term satire in the modern broader sense was Apuleius.

To Quintilian, the satire was a strict literary form, but the term soon escaped from the original narrow definition. Robert Elliott writes:

As soon as a noun enters the domain of metaphor, as one modern scholar has pointed out, it clamours for extension; and satura (which had had no verbal, adverbial, or adjectival forms) was immediately broadened by appropriation from the Greek word for "satyr" (satyros) and its derivatives. The odd result is that the English "satire" comes from the Latin satura; but "satirize", "satiric", etc., are of Greek origin. By about the 4th century AD the writer of satires came to be known as satyricus; St. Jerome, for example, was called by one of his enemies 'a satirist in prose' ('satyricus scriptor in prosa'). Subsequent orthographic modifications obscured the Latin origin of the word satire: satura becomes satyra, and in England, by the 16th century, it was written 'satyre.'

The word satire derives from satura, and its origin was not influenced by the Greek mythological figure of the satyr. In the 17th century, philologist Isaac Casaubon was the first to dispute the etymology of satire from satyr, contrary to the belief up to that time.

== Humour ==
Laughter is not an essential component of satire; in fact, there are types of satire that are not meant to be "funny" at all. Conversely, not all humour, even on such topics as politics, religion or art is necessarily "satirical", even when it uses the satirical tools of irony, parody, and burlesque.

Even light-hearted satire has a serious "after-taste": the organizers of the Ig Nobel Prize describe this as "first make people laugh, and then make them think".

The rules of satire are such that it must do more than make you laugh. No matter how amusing it is, it doesn't count unless you find yourself wincing a little even as you chuckle.

== Social and psychological functions ==
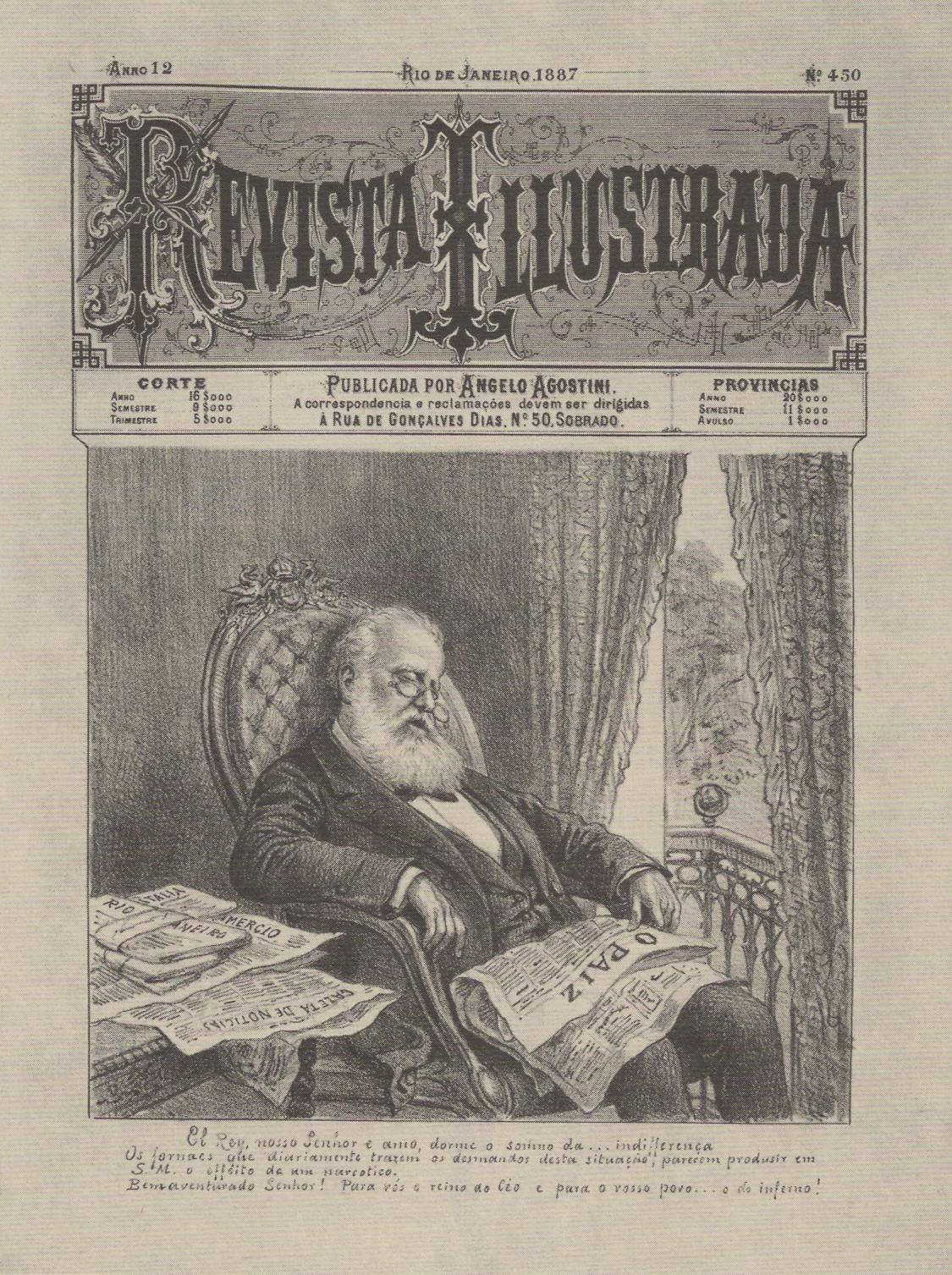
A satire by Angelo Agostini to Revista Illustrada mocking the lack of interest from Emperor Pedro II of Brazil in politics toward the end of his reign (1887)

Satire and irony in some cases have been regarded as the most effective source to understand a society, the oldest form of social study. They provide the keenest insights into a group's collective psyche, reveal its deepest values and tastes, and the society's structures of power. Some authors have regarded satire as superior to non-comic and non-artistic disciplines like history or anthropology. In a prominent example from ancient Greece, philosopher Plato, when asked by a friend for a book to understand Athenian society, referred him to the plays of Aristophanes.

Historically, satire has satisfied the popular need to debunk and ridicule the leading figures in politics, economy, religion and other prominent realms of power. Satire confronts public discourse and the collective imaginary, playing as a public opinion counterweight to power (be it political, economic, religious, symbolic, or otherwise), by challenging leaders and authorities. For instance, it forces administrations to clarify, amend or establish their policies. Satire's job is to expose problems and contradictions, and it is not obligated to solve them. Karl Kraus set in the history of satire a prominent example of a satirist role as confronting public discourse.

For its nature and social role, satire has enjoyed in many societies a special freedom license to mock prominent individuals and institutions. The satiric impulse, and its ritualized expressions, carry out the function of resolving social tension. Institutions like the ritual clowns, by giving expression to the antisocial tendencies, represent a safety valve which re-establishes equilibrium and health in the collective imaginary, which are jeopardized by the repressive aspects of society.

The state of political satire in a given society reflects the tolerance or intolerance that characterizes it, and the state of civil liberties and human rights. Under totalitarian regimes any criticism of a political system, and especially satire, is suppressed. A typical example is the Soviet Union where the dissidents, such as Aleksandr Solzhenitsyn and Andrei Sakharov were under strong pressure from the government. While satire of everyday life in the USSR was allowed, the most prominent satirist being Arkady Raikin, political satire existed in the form of anecdotes that made fun of Soviet political leaders, especially Brezhnev, famous for his narrow-mindedness and love for awards and decorations.

== Classifications ==
Satire is a diverse genre which is complex to classify and define, with a wide range of satiric "modes".

=== Horatian, Juvenalian, Menippean ===
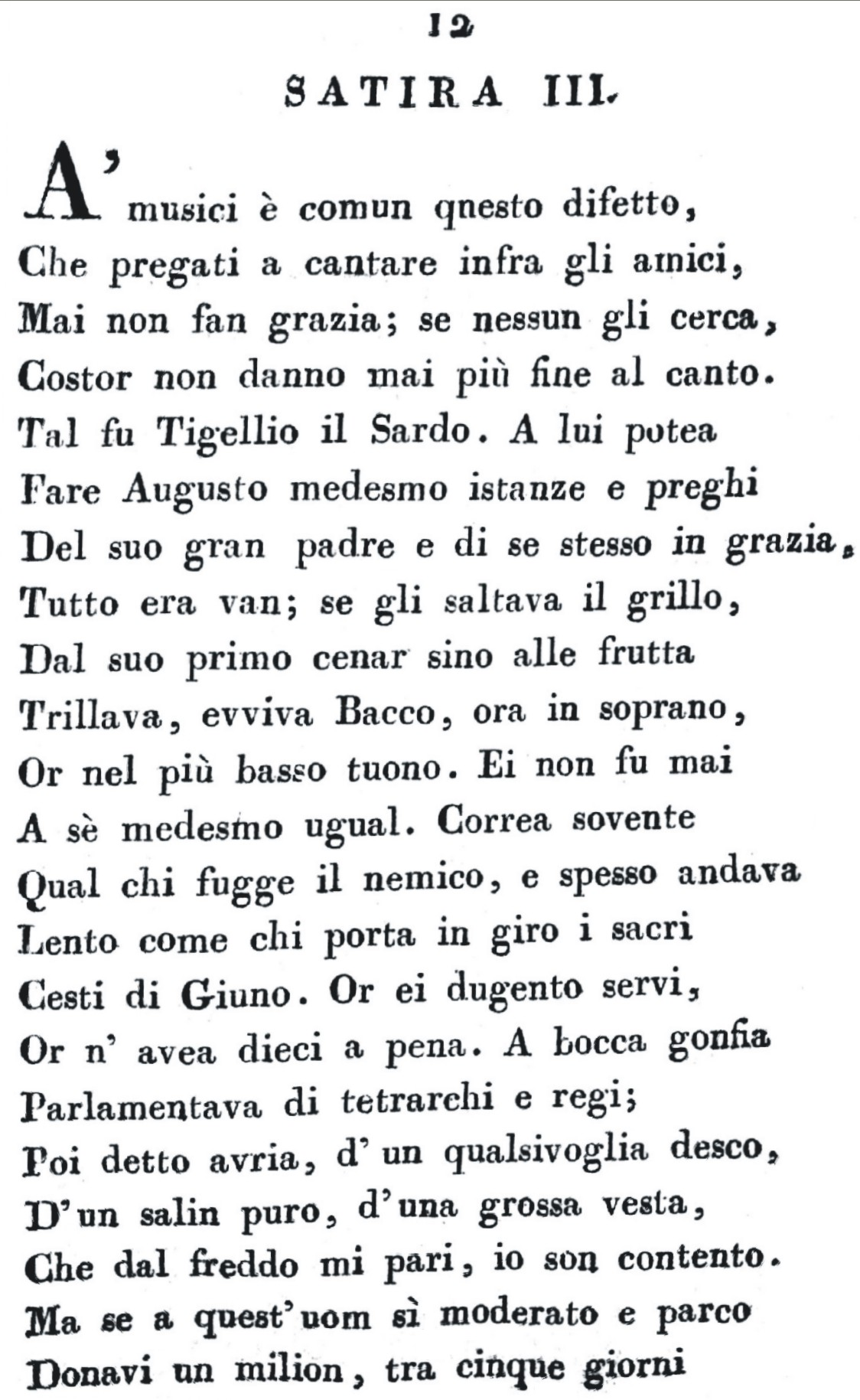
"Le satire e l'epistole di Q. Orazio Flacco", printed in 1814

Satirical literature can commonly be categorized as either Horatian, Juvenalian, or Menippean.

==== Horatian ====
Horatian satire, named for the Roman satirist Horace (65–8 BCE), playfully criticizes some social vice through gentle, mild, and light-hearted humour. Horace (Quintus Horatius Flaccus) wrote Satires to gently ridicule the dominant opinions and "philosophical beliefs of ancient Rome and Greece". Rather than writing in harsh or accusing tones, he addressed issues with humor and clever mockery. Horatian satire follows this same pattern of "gently [ridiculing] the absurdities and follies of human beings".

It directs wit, exaggeration, and self-deprecating humour toward what it identifies as folly, rather than evil. Horatian satire's sympathetic tone is common in modern society. A Horatian satirist's goal is to heal the situation with smiles, rather than by anger. Horatian satire is a gentle reminder to take life less seriously and evokes a wry smile.

==== Juvenalian ====
Juvenalian satire, named for the writings of the Roman satirist Juvenal (late first century – early second century AD), is more contemptuous and abrasive than the Horatian. Juvenal disagreed with the opinions of the public figures and institutions of the Empire and actively attacked them through his literature. "He utilized the satirical tools of exaggeration and parody to make his targets appear monstrous and incompetent". Juvenal's satire follows this same pattern of abrasively ridiculing societal structures. Juvenal also, unlike Horace, attacked public officials and governmental organizations through his satires, regarding their opinions as not just wrong, but evil.

Following in this tradition, Juvenalian satire addresses perceived social evil through scorn, outrage, and savage ridicule. This form is often pessimistic, characterized by the use of irony, sarcasm, moral indignation and personal invective, with less emphasis on humor. Strongly polarized political satire can often be classified as Juvenalian.

A Juvenalian satirist's goal is generally to provoke some sort of political or societal change because he sees his opponent or object as evil or harmful. A Juvenalian satirist mocks "societal structure, power, and civilization" by exaggerating the words or position of his opponent in order to jeopardize their opponent's reputation and/or power. Jonathan Swift has been established as an author who "borrowed heavily from Juvenal's techniques in [his critique] of contemporary English society".

=== Satire vis-à-vis teasing ===
In the history of theatre there has always been a conflict between engagement and disengagement on politics and relevant issue, between satire and grotesque on one side, and jest with teasing on the other. Max Eastman defined the spectrum of satire in terms of "degrees of biting", as ranging from satire proper at the hot-end, and "kidding" at the violet-end; Eastman adopted the term kidding to denote what is just satirical in form, but is not really firing at the target. Nobel laureate satirical playwright Dario Fo pointed out the difference between satire and teasing (sfottò). Teasing is the reactionary side of the comic; it limits itself to a shallow parody of physical appearance. The side-effect of teasing is that it humanizes and draws sympathy for the powerful individual towards which it is directed. Satire instead uses the comic to go against power and its oppressions, has a subversive character, and a moral dimension which draws judgement against its targets. Fo formulated an operational criterion to tell real satire from sfottò, saying that real satire arouses an outraged and violent reaction, and that the more they try to stop you, the better is the job you are doing. Fo contends that, historically, people in positions of power have welcomed and encouraged good-humoured buffoonery, while modern day people in positions of power have tried to censor, ostracize and repress satire.

Teasing (sfottò) is an ancient form of simple buffoonery, a form of comedy without satire's subversive edge. Teasing includes light and affectionate parody, good-humoured mockery, simple one-dimensional poking fun, and benign spoofs. Teasing typically consists of an impersonation of someone monkeying around with his exterior attributes, tics, physical blemishes, voice and mannerisms, quirks, way of dressing and walking, and/or the phrases he typically repeats. By contrast, teasing never touches on the core issue, never makes a serious criticism judging the target with irony; it never harms the target's conduct, ideology and position of power; it never undermines the perception of his morality and cultural dimension. Sfottò directed towards a powerful individual makes him appear more human and draws sympathy towards him. Hermann Göring propagated jests and jokes against himself, with the aim of humanizing his image.

=== Classifications by topics ===
Types of satire can also be classified according to the topics it deals with. From the earliest times, at least since the plays of Aristophanes, the primary topics of literary satire have been politics, religion and sex. This is partly because these are the most pressing problems that affect anybody living in a society, and partly because these topics are usually taboo. Among these, politics in the broader sense is considered the pre-eminent topic of satire. Satire which targets the clergy is a type of political satire, while religious satire is that which targets religious beliefs. Satire on sex may overlap with blue comedy, off-color humor and dick jokes.

Scatology has a long literary association with satire, as it is a classical mode of the grotesque, the grotesque body and the satiric grotesque. Shit plays a fundamental role in satire because it symbolizes death, the turd being "the ultimate dead object". The satirical comparison of individuals or institutions with human excrement, exposes their "inherent inertness, corruption and dead-likeness". The ritual clowns of clown societies, like among the Pueblo Indians, have ceremonies with filth-eating. In other cultures, sin-eating is an apotropaic rite in which the sin-eater (also called filth-eater), by ingesting the food provided, takes "upon himself the sins of the departed". Satire about death overlaps with black humor and gallows humor.

Another classification by topics is the distinction between political satire, religious satire and satire of manners. Political satire is sometimes called topical satire, satire of manners is sometimes called satire of everyday life, and religious satire is sometimes called philosophical satire. Comedy of manners, sometimes also called satire of manners, criticizes mode of life of common people; political satire aims at behavior, manners of politicians, and vices of political systems. Historically, comedy of manners, which first appeared in British theater in 1620, has uncritically accepted the social code of the upper classes. Comedy in general accepts the rules of the social game, while satire subverts them.

Another analysis of satire is the spectrum of his possible tones: wit, ridicule, irony, sarcasm, cynicism, misanthropy the sardonic and invective.

The type of humour that deals with creating laughter at the expense of the person telling the joke is called reflexive humour. Reflexive humour can take place at dual levels of directing humour at self or at the larger community the self identifies with. The audience's understanding of the context of reflexive humour is important for its receptivity and success. Satire is found not only in written literary forms. In preliterate cultures it manifests itself in ritual and folk forms, as well as in trickster tales and oral poetry.

It appears also in graphic arts, music, sculpture, dance, cartoon strips, and graffiti. Examples are Dada sculptures, Pop Art works, music of Gilbert and Sullivan and Erik Satie, punk and rock music. In modern media culture, stand-up comedy is an enclave in which satire can be introduced into mass media, challenging mainstream discourse. Comedy roasts, mock festivals, and stand-up comedians in nightclubs and concerts are the modern forms of ancient satiric rituals.

== Development ==
=== Ancient Egypt ===
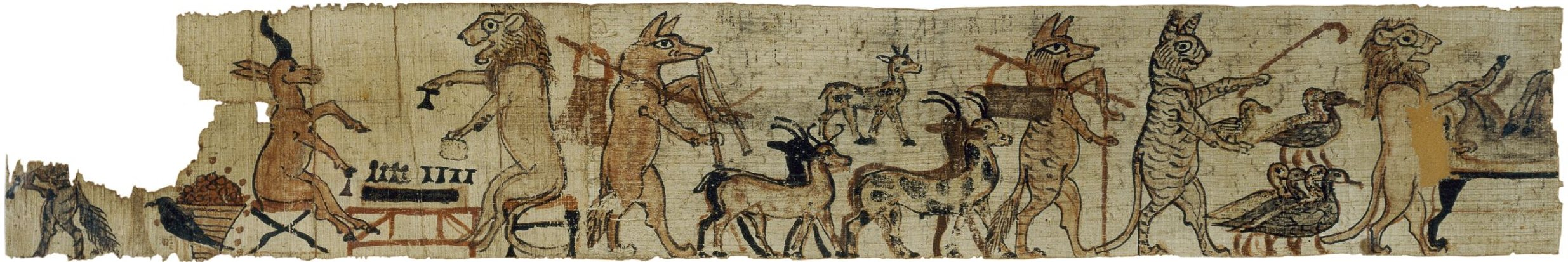
The satirical papyrus at the British Museum

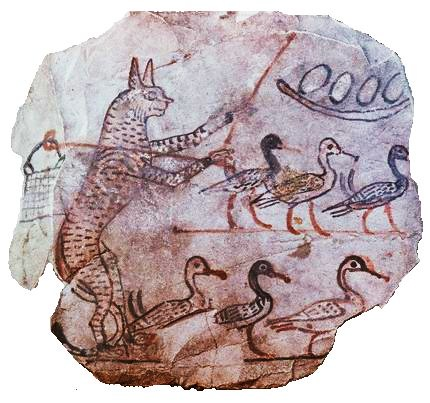
Satirical ostracon showing a cat guarding geese, c. 1120 BC, Egypt

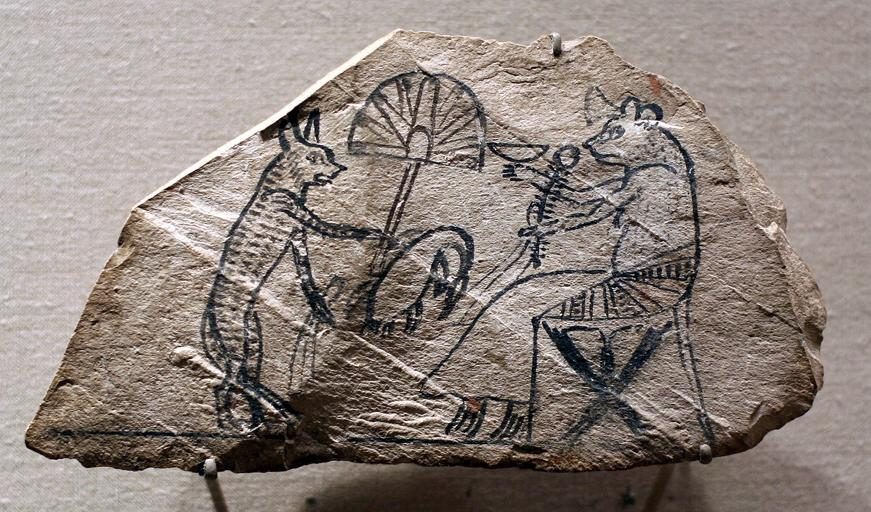
Figured ostracon showing a cat waiting on a mouse, Egypt

One of the earliest examples of what might be called satire, The Satire of the Trades, is in Egyptian writing from the beginning of the 2nd millennium BC. The text's apparent readers are students, tired of studying. It argues that their lot as scribes is not only useful, but far superior to that of the ordinary man. Scholars such as Helck think that the context was meant to be serious.

The Papyrus Anastasi I (late 2nd millennium BC) contains a satirical letter which first praises the virtues of its recipient, but then mocks the reader's meagre knowledge and achievements.

=== Ancient Greece ===
The Greeks had no word for what later would be called "satire", although the terms cynicism and parody were used. Modern critics call the Greek playwright Aristophanes one of the best known early satirists: his plays are known for their critical political and societal commentary, particularly for the political satire by which he criticized the powerful Cleon (as in The Knights). He is also notable for the persecution he underwent. Aristophanes' plays turned upon images of filth and disease. His bawdy style was adopted by Greek dramatist-comedian Menander. His early play Drunkenness contains an attack on the politician Callimedon.

The oldest form of satire still in use is the Menippean satire by Menippus of Gadara. His own writings are lost. Examples from his admirers and imitators mix seriousness and mockery in dialogues and present parodies before a background of diatribe. As in the case of Aristophanes plays, menippean satire turned upon images of filth and disease.

=== Ancient China ===
Satire, or fengci (諷刺) the way it is called in Chinese, goes back at least to Confucius, being mentioned in the Book of Odes (Shijing 詩經). It meant "to criticize by means of an ode". In the pre-Qin era it was also common for schools of thought to clarify their views through the use of short explanatory anecdotes, also called yuyan (寓言), translated as "entrusted words". These yuyan usually were brimming with satirical content. The Daoist text Zhuangzi is the first to define this concept of Yuyan. During the Qin and Han dynasty, however, the concept of yuyan mostly died out through their heavy persecution of dissent and literary circles, especially by Qin Shi Huang and Han Wudi.

=== Roman world ===
The first Roman to discuss satire critically was Quintilian, who invented the term to describe the writings of Gaius Lucilius. The two most prominent and influential ancient Roman satirists are Horace and Juvenal, who wrote during the early days of the Roman Empire. Other important satirists in ancient Latin are Gaius Lucilius and Persius. Satire in their work is much wider than in the modern sense of the word, including fantastic and highly coloured humorous writing with little or no real mocking intent. When Horace criticized Augustus, he used veiled ironic terms. In contrast, Pliny reports that the 6th-century-BC poet Hipponax wrote satirae that were so cruel that the offended hanged themselves.

In the 2nd century AD, Lucian wrote True History, a book satirizing the clearly unrealistic travelogues/adventures written by Ctesias, Iambulus, and Homer. He states that he was surprised they expected people to believe their lies, and stating that he, like them, has no actual knowledge or experience, but shall now tell lies as if he did. He goes on to describe a far more obviously extreme and unrealistic tale, involving interplanetary exploration, war among alien life forms, and life inside a 200 mile long whale back in the terrestrial ocean, all intended to make obvious the fallacies of books like Indica and The Odyssey.

=== Medieval Islamic world ===
Medieval Arabic poetry included the satiric genre hija. Satire was introduced into Arabic prose literature by the author Al-Jahiz in the 9th century. While dealing with serious topics in what are now known as anthropology, sociology and psychology, he introduced a satirical approach, "based on the premise that, however serious the subject under review, it could be made more interesting and thus achieve greater effect, if only one leavened the lump of solemnity by the insertion of a few amusing anecdotes or by the throwing out of some witty or paradoxical observations. He was well aware that, in treating of new themes in his prose works, he would have to employ a vocabulary of a nature more familiar in hija, satirical poetry." For example, in one of his zoological works, he satirized the preference for longer human penis size, writing: "If the length of the penis were a sign of honor, then the mule would belong to the (honorable tribe of) Quraysh". Another satirical story based on this preference was an Arabian Nights tale called "Ali with the Large Member".

In the 10th century, the writer Tha'alibi recorded satirical poetry written by the Arabic poets As-Salami and Abu Dulaf, with As-Salami mocking Abu Dulaf's abilities in these subjects, and with Abu Dulaf responding back and satirizing As-Salami in return. An example of Arabic political satire the Umayyad poet Jarir satirizing Farazdaq as "a transgressor of the Sharia" and later Arabic poets in turn using the term "Farazdaq-like" as a form of political satire.

The terms "comedy" and "satire" became synonymous after Aristotle's Poetics was translated into Arabic in the medieval Islamic world, where it was elaborated upon by Islamic philosophers and writers, such as Abu Bischr, his pupil Al-Farabi, Avicenna, and Averroes. Due to cultural differences, they disassociated comedy from Greek dramatic representation and instead identified it with Arabic poetic themes and forms, such as hija (satirical poetry). They viewed comedy as simply the "art of reprehension", and made no reference to light and cheerful events, or troubled beginnings and happy endings, associated with classical Greek comedy. After the Latin translations of the 12th century, the term "comedy" thus gained a new semantic meaning in Medieval literature.

Ubayd Zakani introduced satire in Persian literature during the 14th century. His work is noted for its satire and obscene verses, often political or bawdy, and often cited in debates involving homosexual practices. He wrote the Resaleh-ye Delgosha, as well as Akhlaq al-Ashraf ("Ethics of the Aristocracy") and the famous humorous fable Masnavi Mush-O-Gorbeh (Mouse and Cat), which was a political satire. His non-satirical serious classical verses have also been regarded as very well written, in league with the other great works of Persian literature. Between 1905 and 1911, Bibi Khatoon Astarabadi and other Iranian writers wrote notable satires.

=== Medieval Europe ===
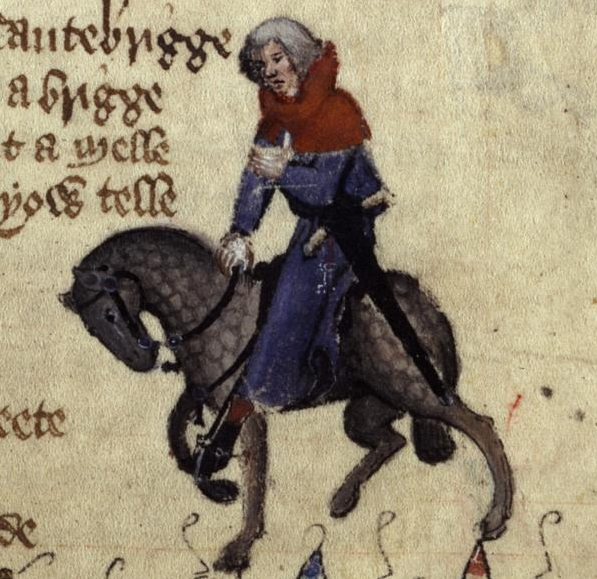
"The Reeve's Tale", the third story in Geoffrey Chaucer's The Canterbury Tales, contains the first appearance in English literature of a common humorous device across all forms of media, the comedic use of dialect.

In the Early Middle Ages, examples of satire were the songs by Goliards or vagants now best known as an anthology called Carmina Burana and made famous as texts of a composition by the 20th-century composer Carl Orff. Satirical poetry is believed to have been popular, although little has survived. With the advent of the High Middle Ages and the birth of modern vernacular literature in the 12th century, it began to be used again, most notably by Chaucer. The disrespectful manner was considered "unchristian" and ignored, except for the moral satire, which mocked misbehaviour in Christian terms. Examples are Livre des Manières by Étienne de Fougères (~1178), and some of Chaucer's Canterbury Tales. Sometimes epic poetry (epos) was mocked, and even feudal society, but there was hardly a general interest in the genre.

In the High Middle Ages the work Reynard the Fox, written by Willem die Madoc maecte, and its translations were a popular work that satirized the class system at the time. Representing the various classes as certain anthropomorphic animals. As example, the lion in the story represents the nobility, which is portrayed as being weak and without character, but very greedy. Versions of Reynard the Fox were also popular well into the early modern period. The Dutch translation Van den vos Reynaerde is considered a major medieval Dutch literary work. In the Dutch version De Vries argues that the animal characters represent barons who conspired against the Count of Flanders.

=== Early modern western satire ===
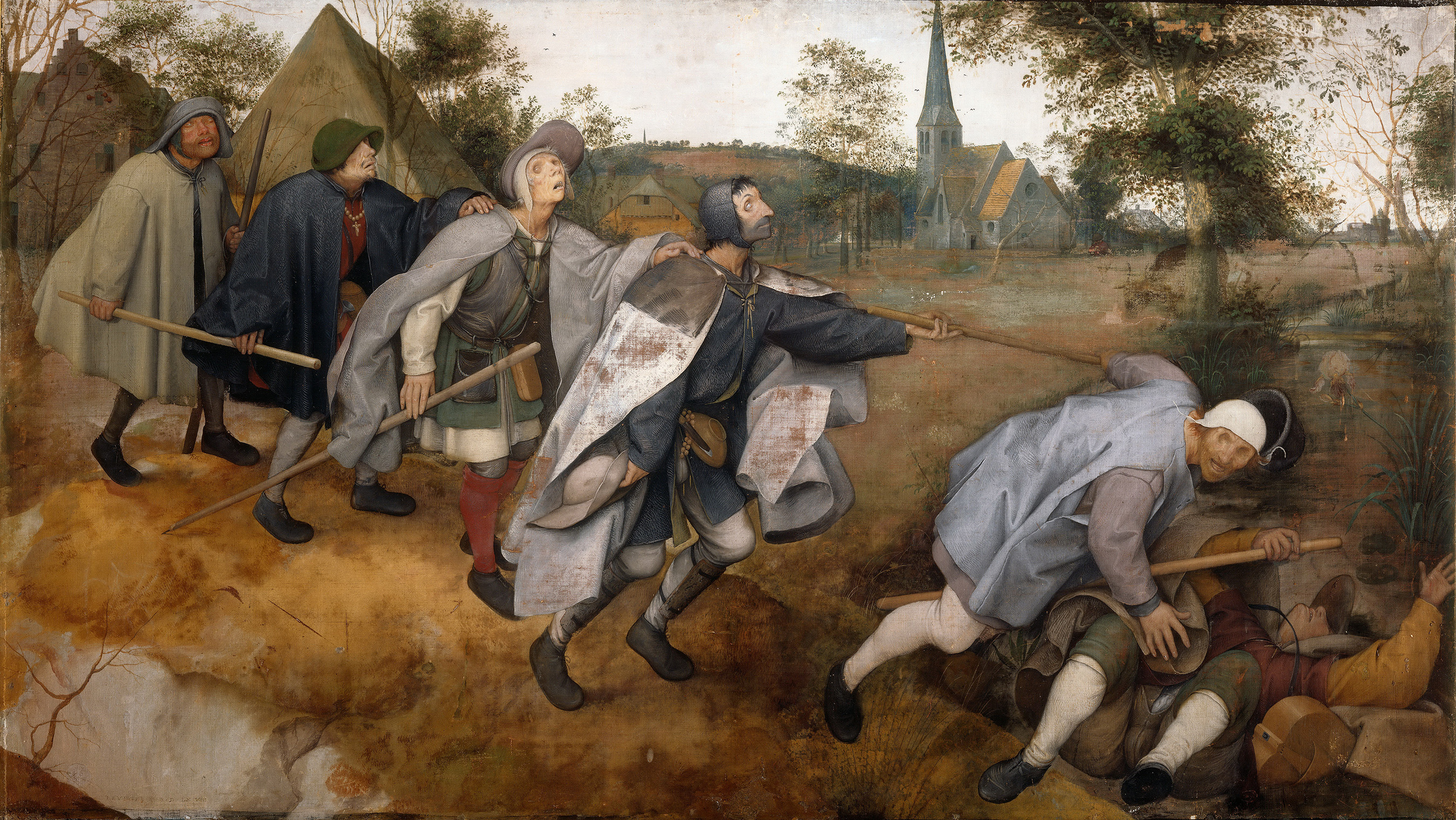
Pieter Bruegel's 1568 satirical painting The Blind Leading the Blind

Direct social commentary via satire returned in the 16th century, when texts such as the works of François Rabelais tackled more serious issues.

Two major satirists of Europe in the Renaissance were Giovanni Boccaccio and François Rabelais. Other examples of Renaissance satire include Till Eulenspiegel, Reynard the Fox, Sebastian Brant's Narrenschiff (1494), Erasmus's Moriae Encomium (1509), Thomas More's Utopia (1516), and Carajicomedia (1519).

The Elizabethan (i.e. 16th-century English) writers thought of satire as related to the notoriously rude, coarse and sharp satyr play. Elizabethan "satire" (typically in pamphlet form) therefore contains more straightforward abuse than subtle irony. The French Huguenot Isaac Casaubon pointed out in 1605 that satire in the Roman fashion was something altogether more civilised. Casaubon discovered and published Quintilian's writing and presented the original meaning of the term (satira, not satyr), and the sense of wittiness (reflecting the "dishfull of fruits") became more important again. Seventeenth-century English satire once again aimed at the "amendment of vices" (Dryden).

In the 1590s a new wave of verse satire broke with the publication of Hall's Virgidemiarum, six books of verse satires targeting everything from literary fads to corrupt noblemen. Although Donne had already circulated satires in manuscript, Hall's was the first real attempt in English at verse satire on the Juvenalian model. The success of his work combined with a national mood of disillusion in the last years of Elizabeth's reign triggered an avalanche of satire—much of it less conscious of classical models than Hall's — until the fashion was brought to an abrupt stop by censorship. (Note: The Archbishop of Canterbury and the Bishop of London, the censors of the press, issued Orders to the Stationers' Company on June 1 and 4, 1599, prohibiting the further printing of satires—the so-called 'Bishop's Ban'.)

Another satiric genre to emerge around this time was the satirical almanac, with François Rabelais's work Pantagrueline Prognostication (1532), which mocked astrological predictions. The strategies François utilized within this work were employed by later satirical almanacs, such as the Poor Robin series that spanned the 17th to 19th centuries.

=== Ancient and modern India ===
Satire (Kataksh or Vyang) has played a prominent role in Indian and Hindi literature, and is counted as one of the "ras" of literature in ancient books. With the commencement of printing of books in local language in the nineteenth century and especially after India's freedom, this grew. Many of the works of Tulsi Das, Kabir, Munshi Premchand, village minstrels, Hari katha singers, poets, Dalit singers and current day stand up Indian comedians incorporate satire, usually ridiculing authoritarians, fundamentalists and incompetent people in power. In India, it has usually been used as a means of expression and an outlet for common people to express their anger against authoritarian entities.

=== Age of Enlightenment ===
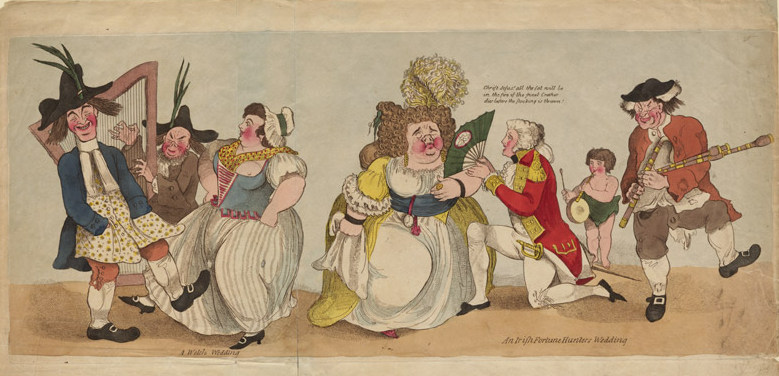
'A Welch wedding' satirical cartoon c. 1780

The Age of Enlightenment, an intellectual movement in the 17th and 18th centuries advocating rationality, produced a great revival of satire in Britain. This was fuelled by the rise of partisan politics, with the formalisation of the Tory and Whig parties—and also, in 1714, by the formation of the Scriblerus Club, which included Alexander Pope, Jonathan Swift, John Gay, John Arbuthnot, Robert Harley, Thomas Parnell, and Henry St John, 1st Viscount Bolingbroke. This club included several of the notable satirists of early-18th-century Britain. They focused their attention on Martinus Scriblerus, "an invented learned fool... whose work they attributed all that was tedious, narrow-minded, and pedantic in contemporary scholarship". In their hands astute and biting satire of institutions and individuals became a popular weapon. The turn to the 18th century was characterized by a switch from Horatian, soft, pseudo-satire, to biting "juvenal" satire.

Jonathan Swift was one of the greatest of Anglo-Irish satirists, and one of the first to practise modern journalistic satire. For instance, In his A Modest Proposal Swift suggests that Irish peasants be encouraged to sell their own children as food for the rich, as a solution to the "problem" of poverty. His purpose is of course to attack indifference to the plight of the desperately poor. In his book Gulliver's Travels he writes about the flaws in human society in general and English society in particular. John Dryden wrote an influential essay entitled "A Discourse Concerning the Original and Progress of Satire" that helped fix the definition of satire in the literary world. His satirical Mac Flecknoe was written in response to a rivalry with Thomas Shadwell and eventually inspired Alexander Pope to write his satirical Dunciad.

Alexander Pope (b. May 21, 1688) was a satirist known for his Horatian satirist style and translation of the Iliad. Famous throughout and after the long 18th century, Pope died in 1744. Pope, in his The Rape of the Lock, is delicately chiding society in a sly but polished voice by holding up a mirror to the follies and vanities of the upper class. Pope does not actively attack the self-important pomp of the British aristocracy, but rather presents it in such a way that gives the reader a new perspective from which to easily view the actions in the story as foolish and ridiculous. A mockery of the upper class, more delicate and lyrical than brutal, Pope nonetheless is able to effectively illuminate the moral degradation of society to the public. The Rape of the Lock assimilates the masterful qualities of a heroic epic, such as the Iliad, which Pope was translating at the time of writing The Rape of the Lock. However, Pope applied these qualities satirically to a seemingly petty egotistical elitist quarrel to prove his point wryly. Other satirical works by Pope include the Epistle to Dr Arbuthnot.

Daniel Defoe pursued a more journalistic type of satire, being famous for his The True-Born Englishman which mocks xenophobic patriotism, and The Shortest-Way with the Dissenters—advocating religious toleration by means of an ironic exaggeration of the highly intolerant attitudes of his time.

The pictorial satire of William Hogarth is a precursor to the development of political cartoons in 18th-century England. The medium developed under the direction of its greatest exponent, James Gillray from London. With his satirical works calling the king (George III), prime ministers and generals (especially Napoleon) to account, Gillray's wit and keen sense of the ridiculous made him the pre-eminent cartoonist of the era.

Ebenezer Cooke (1665–1732), author of "The Sot-Weed Factor" (1708), was among the first writers of literary satire in Colonial America. Benjamin Franklin (1706–1790) and others followed, using satire to shape an emerging nation's culture through its sense of the ridiculous.

=== Satire in Victorian England ===
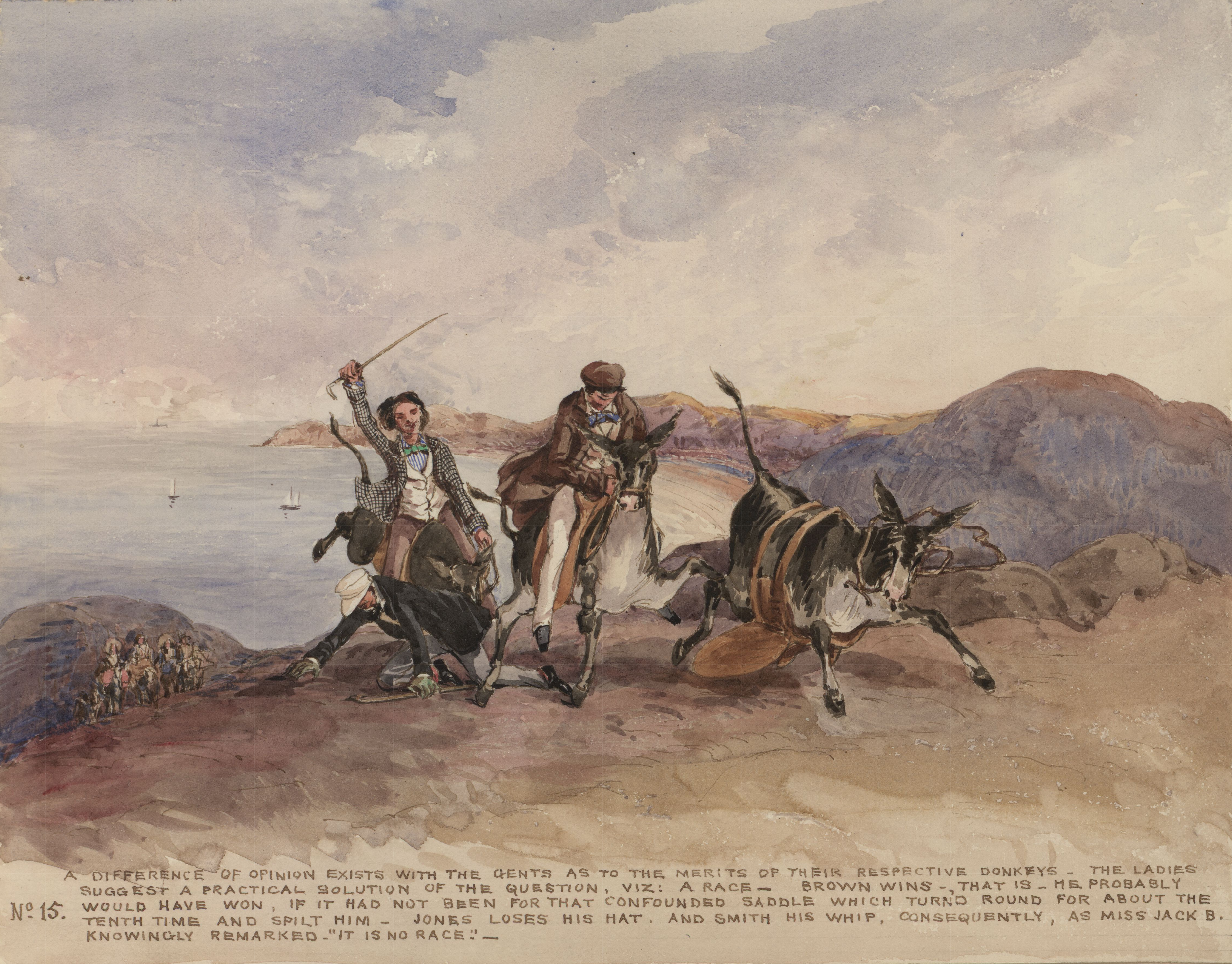
A Victorian satirical sketch depicting a gentleman's donkey race in 1852

Several satiric papers competed for the public's attention in the Victorian era (1837–1901) and Edwardian period, such as Punch (1841) and Fun (1861).

Perhaps the most enduring examples of Victorian satire, however, are to be found in the Savoy Operas of Gilbert and Sullivan. In fact, in The Yeomen of the Guard, a jester is given lines that paint a very neat picture of the method and purpose of the satirist, and might almost be taken as a statement of Gilbert's own intent:

"I can set a braggart quailing with a quip,
The upstart I can wither with a whim;
He may wear a merry laugh upon his lip,
But his laughter has an echo that is grim!"

Novelists such as Charles Dickens (1812–1870) often used passages of satiric writing in their treatment of social issues.

Continuing the tradition of Swiftian journalistic satire, Sidney Godolphin Osborne (1808–1889) was the most prominent writer of scathing "Letters to the Editor" of the London Times. Famous in his day, he is now all but forgotten. His maternal grandfather William Eden, 1st Baron Auckland was considered to be a possible candidate for the authorship of the Junius letters. Osborne's satire was so bitter and biting that at one point he received a public censure from Parliament's then Home Secretary Sir James Graham. Osborne wrote mostly in the Juvenalian mode over a wide range of topics mostly centered on British government's and landlords' mistreatment of poor farm workers and field laborers. He bitterly opposed the New Poor Laws and was passionate on the subject of the British government's botched response to the Great Irish Famine and the mistreatment of British soldiers during the Crimean War.

A number of works of fiction during this time, influenced by Egyptomania, used the backdrop of Ancient Egypt as a device for satire. Some works, like Edgar Allan Poe's Some Words with a Mummy (1845) and Grant Allen's My New Year's Eve Among the Mummies (1878), portrayed Egyptian civilization as having already achieved many of the Victorian era's advancements (like the steam engine and gaslamps) in an effort to satire the notion of progress. Other works, like Jane Loudon's The Mummy!: Or a Tale of the Twenty-Second Century, satirized Victorian curiosities with the afterlife.

Later in the nineteenth century, in the United States, Mark Twain (1835–1910) grew to become American's greatest satirist: his novel Huckleberry Finn (1884) is set in the antebellum South, where the moral values Twain wishes to promote are completely turned on their heads. His hero, Huck, is a rather simple but goodhearted lad who is ashamed of the "sinful temptation" that leads him to help a fugitive slave. In fact his conscience, warped by the distorted moral world he has grown up in, often bothers him most when he is at his best. He is prepared to do good, believing it to be wrong.

Twain's younger contemporary Ambrose Bierce (1842–1913) gained notoriety as a cynic, pessimist and black humorist with his dark, bitterly ironic stories, many set during the American Civil War, which satirized the limitations of human perception and reason. Bierce's most famous work of satire is probably The Devil's Dictionary (1906), in which the definitions mock cant, hypocrisy and received wisdom.

=== 20th-century satire ===
Karl Kraus is considered the first major European satirist since Jonathan Swift. In 20th-century literature, satire was used by English authors such as Aldous Huxley (1930s) and George Orwell (1940s), who under the inspiration of Zamyatin's Russian 1921 novel We, made serious and even frightening commentaries on the dangers of the sweeping social changes taking place throughout Europe. Anatoly Lunacharsky wrote 'Satire attains its greatest significance when a newly evolving class creates an ideology considerably more advanced than that of the ruling class, but has not yet developed to the point where it can conquer it. Herein lies its truly great ability to triumph, its scorn for its adversary and its hidden fear of it. Herein lies its venom, its amazing energy of hate, and quite frequently, its grief, like a black frame around glittering images. Herein lie its contradictions, and its power.' Many social critics of this same time in the United States, such as Dorothy Parker and H. L. Mencken, used satire as their main weapon, and Mencken in particular is noted for having said that "one horse-laugh is worth ten thousand syllogisms" in the persuasion of the public to accept a criticism. Novelist Sinclair Lewis was known for his satirical stories such as Main Street (1920), Babbitt (1922), Elmer Gantry (1927; dedicated by Lewis to H. L. Mencken), and It Can't Happen Here (1935), and his books often explored and satirized contemporary American values. The film The Great Dictator (1940) by Charlie Chaplin is itself a parody of Adolf Hitler; Chaplin later declared that he would have not made the film if he had known about the concentration camps.

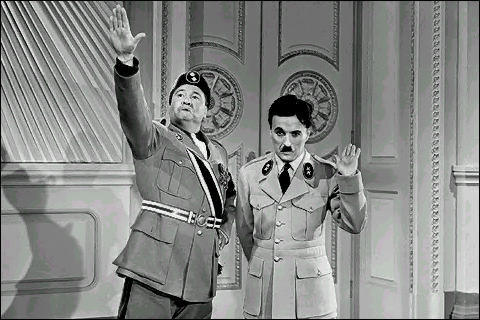
Benzino Napaloni and Adenoid Hynkel in The Great Dictator (1940).

Modern Soviet satire was very popular in the 1920s and 1930s. This form of satire is recognized by its level of sophistication and intelligence used, along with its own level of parody. Since there is no longer the need of survival or revolution to write about, modern Soviet satire focused on the quality of life.

In the United States 1950s, satire was introduced into American stand-up comedy most prominently by Lenny Bruce and Mort Sahl. As they challenged the taboos and conventional wisdom of the time, were ostracized by the mass media establishment as sick comedians. In the same period, Paul Krassner's magazine The Realist began publication, to become immensely popular during the 1960s and early 1970s among people in the counterculture; it had articles and cartoons that were savage, biting satires of politicians such as Lyndon Johnson and Richard Nixon, the Vietnam War, the Cold War and the war on drugs. This baton was also carried by the original National Lampoon magazine, edited by Doug Kenney and Henry Beard and featuring blistering satire written by Michael O'Donoghue, P.J. O'Rourke, and Tony Hendra, among others. Prominent satiric stand-up comedian George Carlin acknowledged the influence The Realist had in his 1970s conversion to a satiric comedian.

"We Will All Go Together When We Go" by Tom Lehrer, a song which comically satirizes the threat of nuclear holocaust during the Cold War.

A more humorous brand of satire enjoyed a renaissance in the UK in the early 1960s with the satire boom, led by comedians including Peter Cook, Alan Bennett, Jonathan Miller, and Dudley Moore, whose stage show Beyond the Fringe was a hit not only in Britain, but also in the United States. Other significant influences in 1960s British satire include David Frost, Eleanor Bron and the television program That Was The Week That Was.

Joseph Heller's most famous work, Catch-22 (1961), satirizes bureaucracy and the military, and is frequently cited as one of the greatest literary works of the twentieth century. Departing from traditional Hollywood farce and screwball, director and comedian Jerry Lewis used satire in his self-directed films The Bellboy (1960), The Errand Boy (1961) and The Patsy (1964) to comment on celebrity and the star-making machinery of Hollywood. The film Dr. Strangelove (1964) starring Peter Sellers was a popular satire on the Cold War. Sellers and the British satire boom had a direct influence on the comedy troupe Monty Python. Empire magazine called Monty Python's Life of Brian (1979) "an unrivalled satire on religion".

Severino "Nonoy" Marcelo's 1978 Philippine adult animated comedy film, Tadhana, presents a satirical, humorous and poignant view of the Philippines' history of Spanish colonization.

=== Contemporary satire ===
Contemporary popular usage of the term "satire" is often very imprecise. While satire often uses caricature and parody, by no means are all uses of these or other humorous devices satiric. Refer to the careful definition of satire that heads this article. The Cambridge Companion to Roman Satire also warns of the ambiguous nature of satire:

[W]hile "satire," or perhaps rather "satiric(al)," are words we run up against constantly in analyses of contemporary culture [...], the search for any defining formal charcteristic (sic) [of satire] that will link past to present may turn out to be more frustrating than enlightening.

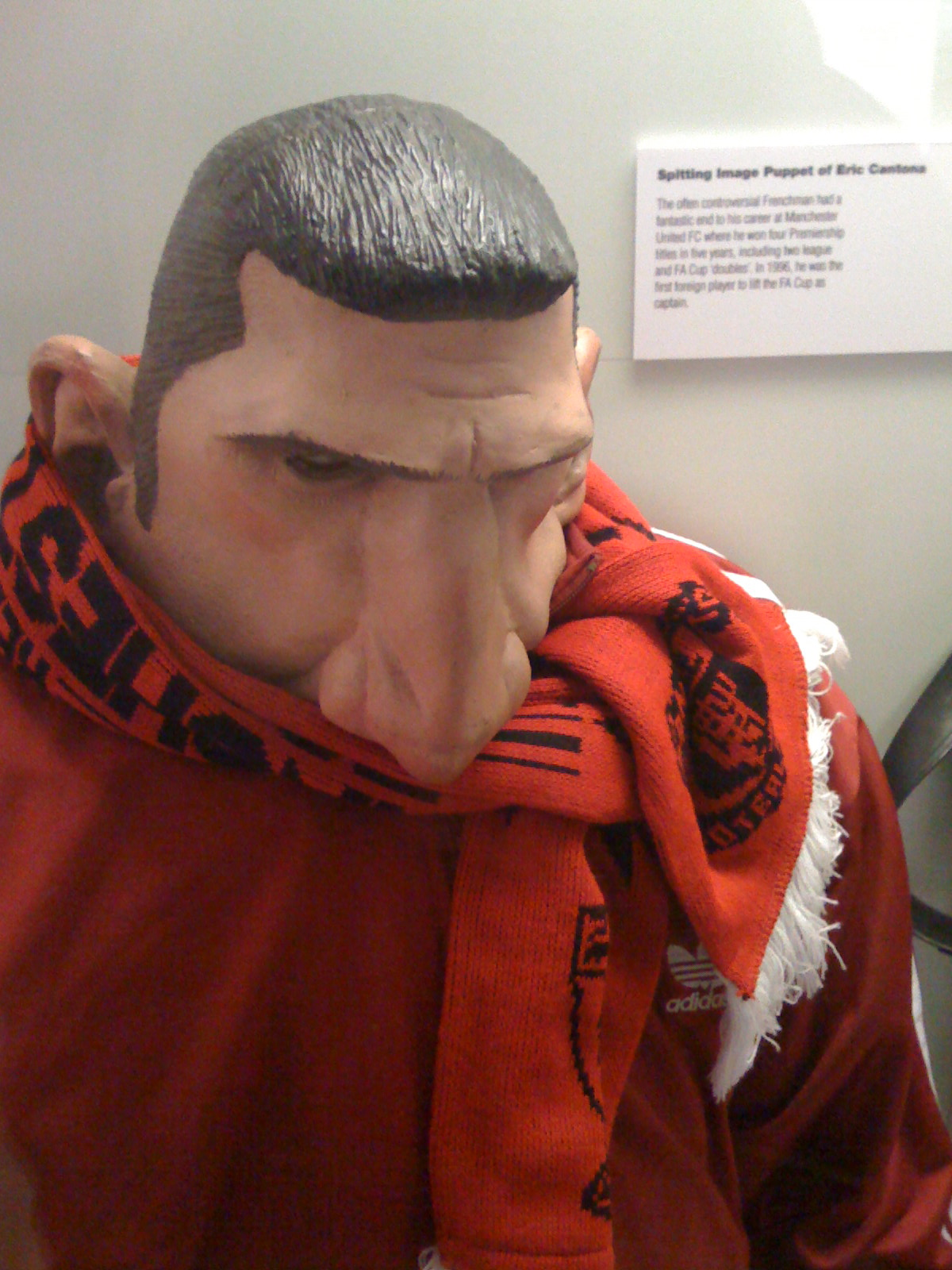
Puppet of Manchester United striker Eric Cantona from the British satirical puppet show Spitting Image

Satire is used on many UK television programmes, particularly popular panel shows and quiz shows such as Mock the Week (2005–2022) and Have I Got News for You (1990–ongoing). It is found on radio quiz shows such as The News Quiz (1977–ongoing) and The Now Show (1998–2024). One of the most watched UK television shows of the 1980s and early 1990s, the puppet show Spitting Image was a satire of the royal family, politics, entertainment, sport and British culture of the era. Court Flunkey from Spitting Image is a caricature of James Gillray, intended as a homage to the father of political cartooning.

Created by DMA Design in 1997, satire features prominently in the British video game series Grand Theft Auto. Another example is the Fallout series, namely Interplay-developed Fallout: A Post Nuclear Role Playing Game (1995). Other games utilizing satire include Postal (1997), State of Emergency (2002), Phone Story (2011), and 7 Billion Humans (2018).

Trey Parker and Matt Stone's South Park (1997–ongoing) relies almost exclusively on satire to address issues in American culture, with episodes addressing racism, anti-Semitism, militant atheism, homophobia, sexism, environmentalism, corporate culture, political correctness and anti-Catholicism, among many other issues.

Satirical web series and sites include Emmy-nominated Honest Trailers (2012–), Internet phenomena-themed Encyclopedia Dramatica (2004–), Uncyclopedia (2005–), self-proclaimed "America's Finest News Source" The Onion (1988–). and The Onion's Christian conservative counterpart The Babylon Bee (2016–).

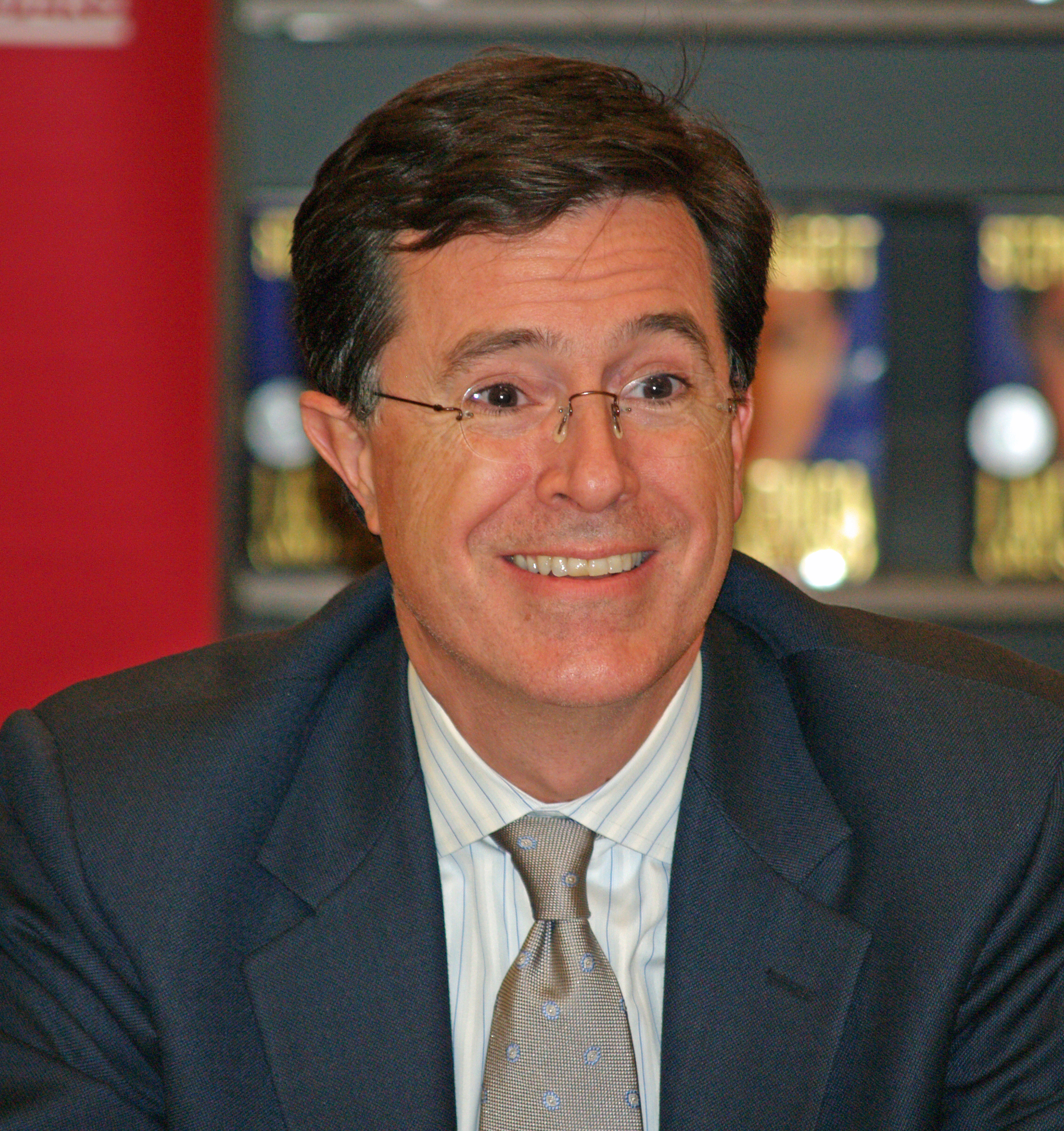
Stephen Colbert satirically impersonated an opinionated and self-righteous television commentator on his Comedy Central program in the U.S.

In the United States, Stephen Colbert's television program, The Colbert Report (2005–14) is instructive in the methods of contemporary American satire; sketch comedy television show Saturday Night Live is also known for its satirical impressions and parodies of prominent persons and politicians, among some of the most notable, their parodies of U.S. political figures Hillary Clinton and of Sarah Palin. Colbert's character is an opinionated and self-righteous commentator who, in his TV interviews, interrupts people, points and wags his finger at them, and "unwittingly" uses a number of logical fallacies. In doing so, he demonstrates the principle of modern American political satire: the ridicule of the actions of politicians and other public figures by taking all their statements and purported beliefs to their furthest (supposedly) logical conclusion, thus revealing their perceived hypocrisy or absurdity.

In the United Kingdom, a popular modern satirist was the late Sir Terry Pratchett, author of the internationally best-selling Discworld book series. One of the most well-known and controversial British satirists is Chris Morris, co-writer and director of Four Lions.

In Canada, satire has become an important part of the comedy scene. Stephen Leacock was one of the best known early Canadian satirists, and in the early 20th century, he achieved fame by targeting the attitudes of small-town life. In more recent years, Canada has had several prominent satirical television series and radio shows. Some, including CODCO, The Royal Canadian Air Farce, This Is That, and This Hour Has 22 Minutes deal directly with current news stories and political figures, while others, like History Bites present contemporary social satire in the context of events and figures in history. The Beaverton is a Canadian news satire site similar to The Onion. Canadian songwriter Nancy White uses music as the vehicle for her satire, and her comic folk songs are regularly played on CBC Radio.

In Hong Kong, there was a well-known Australian Kim Jong-un impersonator Howard X who often utilised satire to show his support for Hong Kong city's pro-democracy movements and liberation of North Korea. He believed humor to be a very powerful weapon and often made it clear that his imitation of the dictator was done to satirize him, not to glorify him. Throughout his career as a professional impersonator he worked with multiple organisations and celebrities to create parodies and to spark conversations about politics and human rights.

Cartoonists often use satire as well as straight humour. Al Capp's satirical comic strip Li'l Abner was censored in September 1947. The controversy, as reported in Time, centred on Capp's portrayal of the US Senate. Said Edward Leech of Scripps-Howard, "We don't think it is good editing or sound citizenship to picture the Senate as an assemblage of freaks and crooks... boobs and undesirables." Walt Kelly's Pogo was likewise censored in 1952 over his overt satire of Senator Joe McCarthy, caricatured in his comic strip as "Simple J. Malarky". Garry Trudeau, whose comic strip Doonesbury focuses on satire of the political system, and provides a trademark cynical view on national events. Trudeau exemplifies humour mixed with criticism. For example, the character Mark Slackmeyer lamented that because he was not legally married to his partner, he was deprived of the "exquisite agony" of experiencing a nasty and painful divorce like heterosexuals. This, of course, satirized the claim that gay unions would denigrate the sanctity of heterosexual marriage.

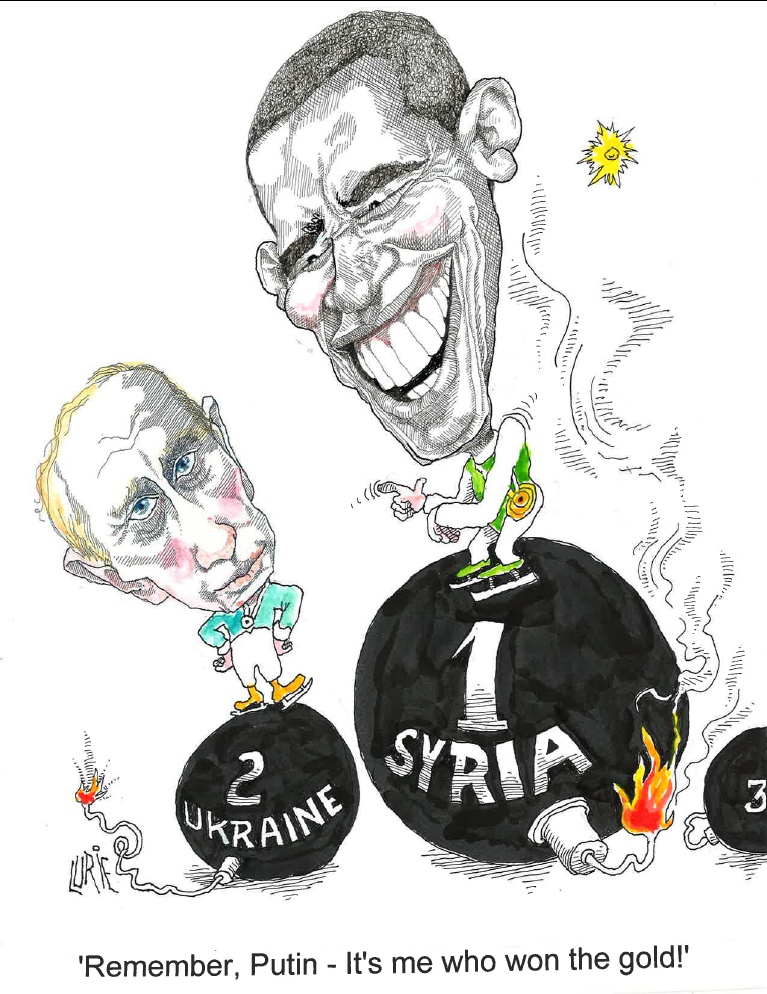
Political satire by Ranan Lurie

Like some literary predecessors, many recent television satires contain strong elements of parody and caricature; for instance, the popular animated series The Simpsons and South Park both parody modern family and social life by taking their assumptions to the extreme; both have led to the creation of similar series. As well as the purely humorous effect of this sort of thing, they often strongly criticise various phenomena in politics, economic life, religion and many other aspects of society, and thus qualify as satirical. Due to their animated nature, these shows can easily use images of public figures and generally have greater freedom to do so than conventional shows using live actors.

News satire is also a very popular form of contemporary satire, appearing in as wide an array of formats as the news media itself: print (e.g. The Onion, Waterford Whispers News, Private Eye), radio (e.g. On the Hour), television (e.g. The Day Today, The Daily Show, Brass Eye) and the web (e.g. Faking News, El Koshary Today, Babylon Bee, The Beaverton, The Daily Bonnet and The Onion). Other satires are on the list of satirists and satires.

In an interview with Wikinews, Sean Mills, President of The Onion, said angry letters about their news parody always carried the same message. "It's whatever affects that person", said Mills. "So it's like, 'I love it when you make a joke about murder or rape, but if you talk about cancer, well my brother has cancer and that's not funny to me.' Or someone else can say, 'Cancer's hilarious, but don't talk about rape because my cousin got raped.' Those are rather extreme examples, but if it affects somebody personally, they tend to be more sensitive about it."

Satire is also gaining recognition for its value in social science research, particularly when authors are seeking to unpack complex social issues like gendered racism.

Satire is regularly used by social movements covering a range of issues to achieve strategic goals. US community organizer and author of Rules for Radicals, Saul Alinsky, stated, 'Humour is essential to a successful tactician, for the most potent weapons known to [people] are satire and ridicule.

== Techniques ==
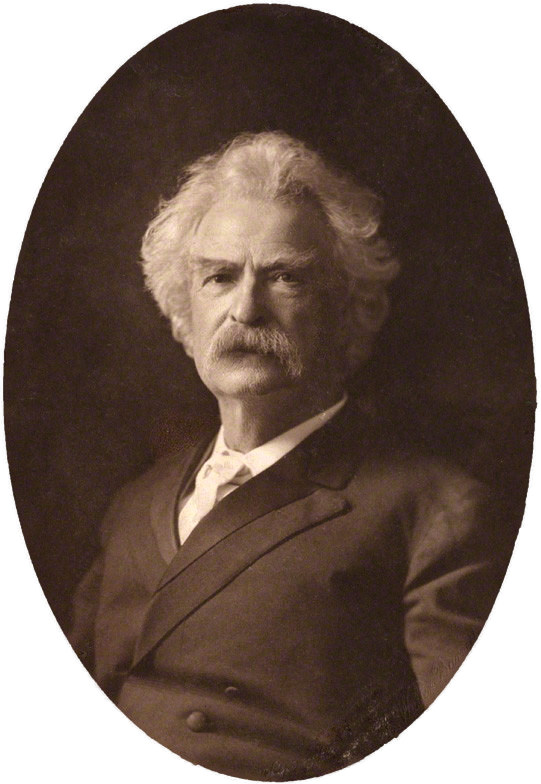
The American writer Mark Twain replied to the imperialism Kipling espoused in "The White Man's Burden" (1899) with the satirical essay "To the Person Sitting in Darkness" (1901), about the anti-imperialist Boxer Rebellion (1899) in China.

Literary satire is usually written out of earlier satiric works, reprising previous conventions, commonplaces, stance, situations and tones of voice. Exaggeration is one of the most common satirical techniques. Contrarily, diminution is also a satirical technique.

== Legal status ==
For its nature and social role, satire has enjoyed in many societies a special freedom license to mock prominent individuals and institutions. In Germany, Japan, and Italy satire is protected by the constitution.

Since satire belongs to the realm of art and artistic expression, it benefits from broader lawfulness limits than mere freedom of information of journalistic kind. In some countries a specific "right to satire" is recognized and its limits go beyond the "right to report" of journalism and even the "right to criticize". Satire benefits not only of the protection to freedom of speech, but also to that to culture, and that to scientific and artistic production.

=== Australia ===
In September 2017 The Juice Media received an e-mail from the Australian National Symbols Officer requesting that the use of a satirical logo, called the "Coat of Harms" based on the Australian Coat of Arms, no longer be used as they had received complaints from the members of the public. Coincidentally 5 days later a Bill was proposed to Australian parliament to amend the Criminal Code Act 1995. If passed, those found to be in breach of the new amendment can face 2–5 years imprisonment.

As of June 2018, the Criminal Code Amendment (Impersonating a Commonwealth Body) Bill 2017 was before the Australian Senate with the third reading moved May 10, 2018.

== Censorship and criticism ==
Descriptions of satire's biting effect on its target include 'venomous', 'cutting', 'stinging', vitriol. Because satire often combines anger and humor, as well as the fact that it addresses and calls into question many controversial issues, it can be profoundly disturbing.

=== Typical arguments ===
Because it is essentially ironic or sarcastic, satire is often misunderstood. A typical misunderstanding is to confuse the satirist with their persona.

==== Bad taste ====
Common uncomprehending responses to satire include revulsion (accusations of poor taste, or that "it's just not funny" for instance) and the idea that the satirist actually does support the ideas, policies, or people being ridiculed. For instance, at the time of its publication, many people misunderstood Swift's purpose in A Modest Proposal, assuming it to be a serious recommendation of economically motivated cannibalism. Much later in history, in the weeks following 9/11 the American public at large found works of satire to be in bad taste and not appropriate for the social climate at the time. Some media outlets at the time, like essayist Roger Rosenblatt in an editorial for Time magazine's September 24 issue, would go so far as to claim that irony was dead.

==== Targeting the victim ====
Some critics of Mark Twain see Huckleberry Finn as racist and offensive, missing the point that its author clearly intended it to be satire (racism being in fact only one of a number of Mark Twain's known concerns attacked in Huckleberry Finn). This same misconception was suffered by the main character of the 1960s British television comedy satire Till Death Us Do Part. The character of Alf Garnett (played by Warren Mitchell) was created to poke fun at the kind of narrow-minded, racist, little Englander that Garnett represented. Instead, his character became a sort of anti-hero to people who actually agreed with his views. (The same phenomenon occurred with Archie Bunker in American TV show All in the Family, a character derived directly from Garnett.

The Australian satirical television comedy show The Chaser's War on Everything has suffered repeated attacks based on various perceived interpretations of the "target" of its attacks. The "Make a Realistic Wish Foundation" sketch (June 2009), which attacked in classical satiric fashion the heartlessness of people who are reluctant to donate to charities, was widely interpreted as an attack on the Make a Wish Foundation, or even the terminally ill children helped by that organisation. Prime Minister of the time Kevin Rudd stated that The Chaser team "should hang their heads in shame". He went on to say that "I didn't see that but it's been described to me. ...But having a go at kids with a terminal illness is really beyond the pale, absolutely beyond the pale." Television station management suspended the show for two weeks and reduced the third season to eight episodes.

==== Romantic prejudice ====
The romantic prejudice against satire is the belief spread by the romantic movement that satire is something unworthy of serious attention; this prejudice has held considerable influence to this day. Such prejudice extends to humour and everything that arouses laughter, which are often underestimated as frivolous and unworthy of serious study. For instance, humor is generally neglected as a topic of anthropological research and teaching.

=== History of opposition toward notable satires ===
Because satire criticises in an ironic, essentially indirect way, it frequently escapes censorship in a way more direct criticism might not. Periodically, however, it runs into serious opposition, and people in power who perceive themselves as attacked attempt to censor it or prosecute its practitioners. In a classic example, Aristophanes was persecuted by the demagogue Cleon.

==== 1599 book ban ====
In 1599, the Archbishop of Canterbury John Whitgift and the Bishop of London Richard Bancroft, whose offices had the function of licensing books for publication in England, issued a decree banning verse satire. The decree, now known as the Bishops' Ban of 1599, ordered the burning of certain volumes of satire by John Marston, Thomas Middleton, Joseph Hall, and others; it also required histories and plays to be specially approved by a member of the Queen's Privy Council, and it prohibited the future printing of satire in verse.

The motives for the ban are obscure, particularly since some of the books banned had been licensed by the same authorities less than a year earlier. Various scholars have argued that the target was obscenity, libel, or sedition. It seems likely that lingering anxiety about the Martin Marprelate controversy, in which the bishops themselves had employed satirists, played a role; both Thomas Nashe and Gabriel Harvey, two of the key figures in that controversy, suffered a complete ban on all their works. In the event, though, the ban was little enforced, even by the licensing authority itself.

==== 21st-century polemics ====
In 2005, the Jyllands-Posten Muhammad cartoons controversy caused global protests by offended Muslims and violent attacks with many fatalities in the Near East. It was not the first case of Muslim protests against criticism in the form of satire, but the Western world was surprised by the hostility of the reaction: Any country's flag in which a newspaper chose to publish the parodies was being burnt in a Near East country, then embassies were attacked, killing 139 people in mainly four countries; politicians throughout Europe agreed that satire was an aspect of the freedom of speech, and therefore to be a protected means of dialogue. Iran threatened to start an International Holocaust Cartoon Competition, which was immediately responded to by Jews with an Israeli Anti-Semitic Cartoons Contest.

In 2006 British comedian Sacha Baron Cohen released Borat: Cultural Learnings of America for Make Benefit Glorious Nation of Kazakhstan, a "mockumentary" that satirized everyone, from high society to frat boys. The film was criticized by many. Although Baron Cohen is Jewish, some complained that it was antisemitic, and the government of Kazakhstan boycotted the film. The film itself had been a reaction to a longer quarrel between the government and the comedian.

In 2008, popular South African cartoonist and satirist Jonathan Shapiro (who is published under the pen name Zapiro) came under fire for depicting then-president of the ANC Jacob Zuma in the act of undressing in preparation for the implied rape of 'Lady Justice' which is held down by Zuma loyalists. The cartoon was drawn in response to Zuma's efforts to duck corruption charges, and the controversy was heightened by the fact that Zuma was himself acquitted of rape in May 2006. In February 2009, the South African Broadcasting Corporation, viewed by some opposition parties as the mouthpiece of the governing ANC, shelved a satirical TV show created by Shapiro, and in May 2009 the broadcaster pulled a documentary about political satire (featuring Shapiro among others) for the second time, hours before scheduled broadcast.

On December 29, 2009, Samsung sued Mike Breen, and the Korea Times for $1 million, claiming criminal defamation over a satirical column published on Christmas Day, 2009.

On April 29, 2015, the UK Independence Party (UKIP) requested Kent Police investigate the BBC, claiming that comments made about Party leader Nigel Farage by a panelist on the comedy show Have I Got News For You might hinder his chances of success in the general election (which would take place a week later), and claimed the BBC breached the Representation of the People Act. Kent Police rebuffed the request to open an investigation, and the BBC released a statement, "Britain has a proud tradition of satire, and everyone knows that the contributors on Have I Got News for You regularly make jokes at the expense of politicians of all parties."

== Satirical prophecy ==
Satire is occasionally prophetic: the jokes precede actual events. Among the eminent examples are:

- The 1784 presaging of modern daylight saving time, later actually proposed in 1907. While an American envoy to France, Benjamin Franklin anonymously published a letter in 1784 suggesting that Parisians economise on candles by arising earlier to use morning sunlight.
- In the 1920s, an English cartoonist imagined a laughable thing for the time: a hotel for cars. He drew a multi-story car park.
- The second episode of Monty Python's Flying Circus, which debuted in 1969, featured a sketch entitled "The Mouse Problem" (meant to satirize contemporary media exposés on homosexuality), which depicted a cultural phenomenon similar to some aspects of the modern furry fandom (which did not become widespread until the 1980s, over a decade after the sketch was first aired).
- The comedy film Americathon, released in 1979 and set in the United States of 1998, predicted a number of trends and events that would eventually unfold in the near future, including an American debt crisis, Chinese capitalism, the fall of the Soviet Union, a presidential sex scandal, and the popularity of reality shows.
- In January 2001, a satirical news article in The Onion, entitled "Our Long National Nightmare of Peace and Prosperity Is Finally Over" had newly elected President George Bush vowing to "develop new and expensive weapons technologies" and to "engage in at least one Gulf War-level armed conflict in the next four years". Furthermore, he would "bring back economic stagnation by implementing substantial tax cuts, which would lead to a recession". This prophesied the Iraq War, the Bush tax cuts, and the Great Recession.
- In 1975, the first episode of Saturday Night Live included an ad for a triple blade razor called the Triple-Trac; in 2001, Gillette introduced the Mach3. In 2004, The Onion satirized Schick and Gillette's marketing of ever-increasingly multi-blade razors with a mock article proclaiming Gillette will now introduce a five-blade razor. In 2006, Gillette released the Gillette Fusion, a five-blade razor.
- After the Iran nuclear deal in 2015, The Onion ran an article with the headline "U.S. Soothes Upset Netanyahu With Shipment Of Ballistic Missiles". Sure enough, reports broke the next day of the Obama administration offering military upgrades to Israel in the wake of the deal.
- In July 2016, The Simpsons released the most recent in a string of satirical references to a potential Donald Trump presidency (although the first was made back in a 2000 episode). Other media sources, including the popular film Back to the Future Part II have also made similar satirical references.
- Infinite Jest, published in 1996, described an alternate America following the presidency of Johnny Gentle, a celebrity who had not held prior political office. Gentle's signature policy was the erection of a wall between the United States and Canada for use as a hazardous waste dump. The US territory behind the wall was "given" to Canada, and the Canadian government was forced to pay for the wall. This appeared to parody the signature campaign promise and background of Donald Trump.

== See also ==
- Culture jamming
- Freedom of the press
- L'Équarrissage pour tous
- Onomasti komodein
- Parody religion
- Sage writing
- Satiric misspellings
- Satirical cartography

== Bibliography ==
- Bosworth, Clifford Edmund (1976), The Mediaeval Islamic Underworld: The Banu Sasan in Arabic Society and Literature, Brill Publishers, ISBN 90-04-04392-6.
- Branham, R Bracht; Kinney, Daniel (1997). Introduction. Satyrica. By Petronius. University of California Press. ISBN 9780520211186.
- Clark, John R (1991), The Modern Satiric Grotesque and its traditions, Lexington: U of Kentucky P, ISBN 9780813130323.
- Corum, Robert T. (2002), "The rhetoric of disgust and contempt in Boileau", in Birberick, Anne Lynn; Ganim, Russell (eds.), The Shape of Change: Essays in Early Modern Literature and La Fontaine in Honor of David Lee Rubin, Rodopi, ISBN 9042014490.
- Davenport, A, ed. (1969), The Poems, Liverpool University Press.
- Elliott, Robert C (2004), "The nature of satire", Encyclopædia Britannica.
- Fo, Dario (1990), "Satira e sfottò", in Allegri, Luigi (ed.), Dialogo provocatorio sul comico, il tragico, la follia e la ragione (interview) (in Italian), pp. 2, 9.
  - Fo, Dario (1993), Provocative Dialogue on the Comic, the Tragic, Folly and Reason, London: Methuen Publishing (transl.).
- Frye, Northrop (1957), Anatomy of Criticism (in particular the discussion of the 4 "myths").
- Hall, Joseph. "Virgidemiae". In Davenport (1969).
- Hodgart, Matthew; Connery, Brian (2009) [1969], Satire: Origins and Principles, Transaction Publishers, ISBN 9781412833646.
- Pietrasik, Vanessa (2011), La satire en jeu. Critique et scepticisme en Allemagne à la fin du XVIIIe siècle (in French), Tusson: Du Lérot éditeur, Charente.
- Test, George Austin (1991), Elliott's Bind; or, What Is Satire, Anyway? in Satire: Spirit & Art, University of South Florida Press, ISBN 9780813010878
- Wilson, R Rawdon (2002), The hydra's tale: imagining disgust, University of Alberta, ISBN 9780888643681.
- Massimo Colella, Seicento satirico: Il Viaggio di Antonio Abati (con edizione critica in appendice), in «La parola del testo», XXVI, 1-2, 2022, pp. 77–100.
