= Alexandrine =

Line of poetic meter comprising 12 syllables

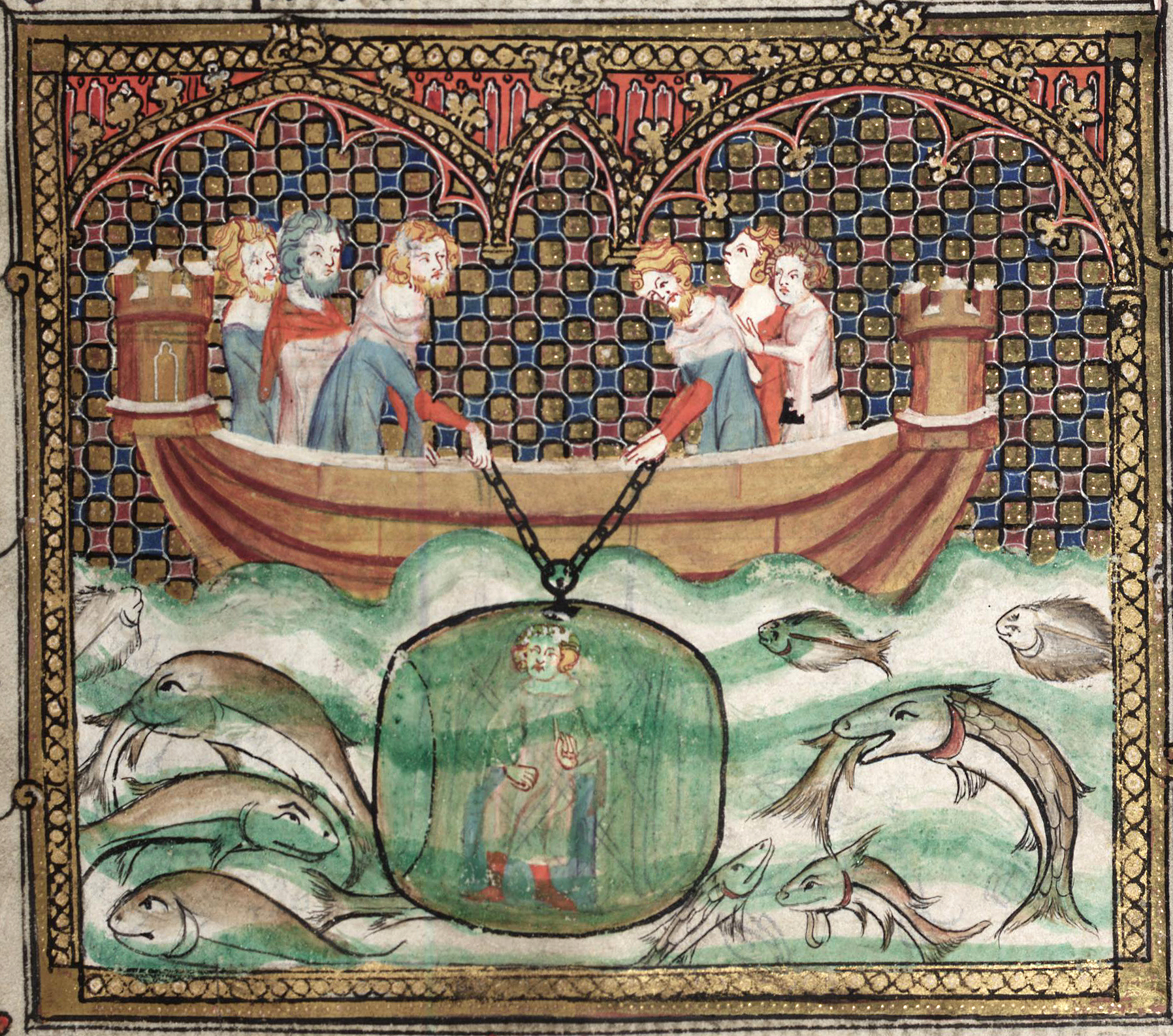
Alexander the Great in a diving bell: a scene from the line's namesake, the Roman d'Alexandre.

Alexandrine is a name used for several distinct types of verse line with related metrical structures, most of which are ultimately derived from the classical French alexandrine. The line's name derives from its use in the Medieval French Roman d'Alexandre of 1170, although it had already been used several decades earlier in Le Pèlerinage de Charlemagne. The foundation of most alexandrines consists of two hemistichs (half-lines) of six syllables each, separated by a caesura (a metrical pause or word break, which may or may not be realized as a stronger syntactic break):

o o o o o o | o o o o o o

o=any syllable; |=caesura

However, no tradition remains this simple. Each applies additional constraints (such as obligatory stress or nonstress on certain syllables) and options (such as a permitted or required additional syllable at the end of one or both hemistichs). Thus a line that is metrical in one tradition may be unmetrical in another.

Where the alexandrine has been adopted, it has frequently served as the heroic verse form of that language or culture, English being a notable exception.

== Scope of the term ==
The term "alexandrine" may be used with greater or lesser rigour. Peureux suggests that only French syllabic verse with a 6+6 structure is, strictly speaking, an alexandrine. Preminger et al. allow a broader scope: "Strictly speaking, the term 'alexandrine' is appropriate to French syllabic meters, and it may be applied to other metrical systems only where they too espouse syllabism as their principle, introduce phrasal accentuation, or rigorously observe the medial caesura, as in French." Common usage within the literatures of European languages is broader still, embracing lines syllabic, accentual-syllabic, and (inevitably) stationed ambivalently between the two; lines of 12, 13, or even 14 syllables; lines with obligatory, predominant, and optional caesurae.

== French ==
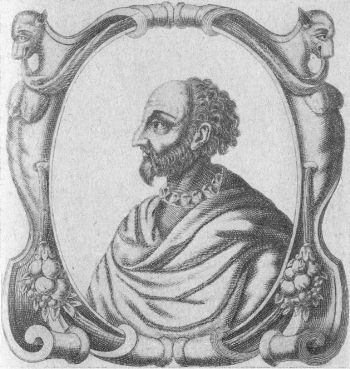
Jean-Antoine de Baïf

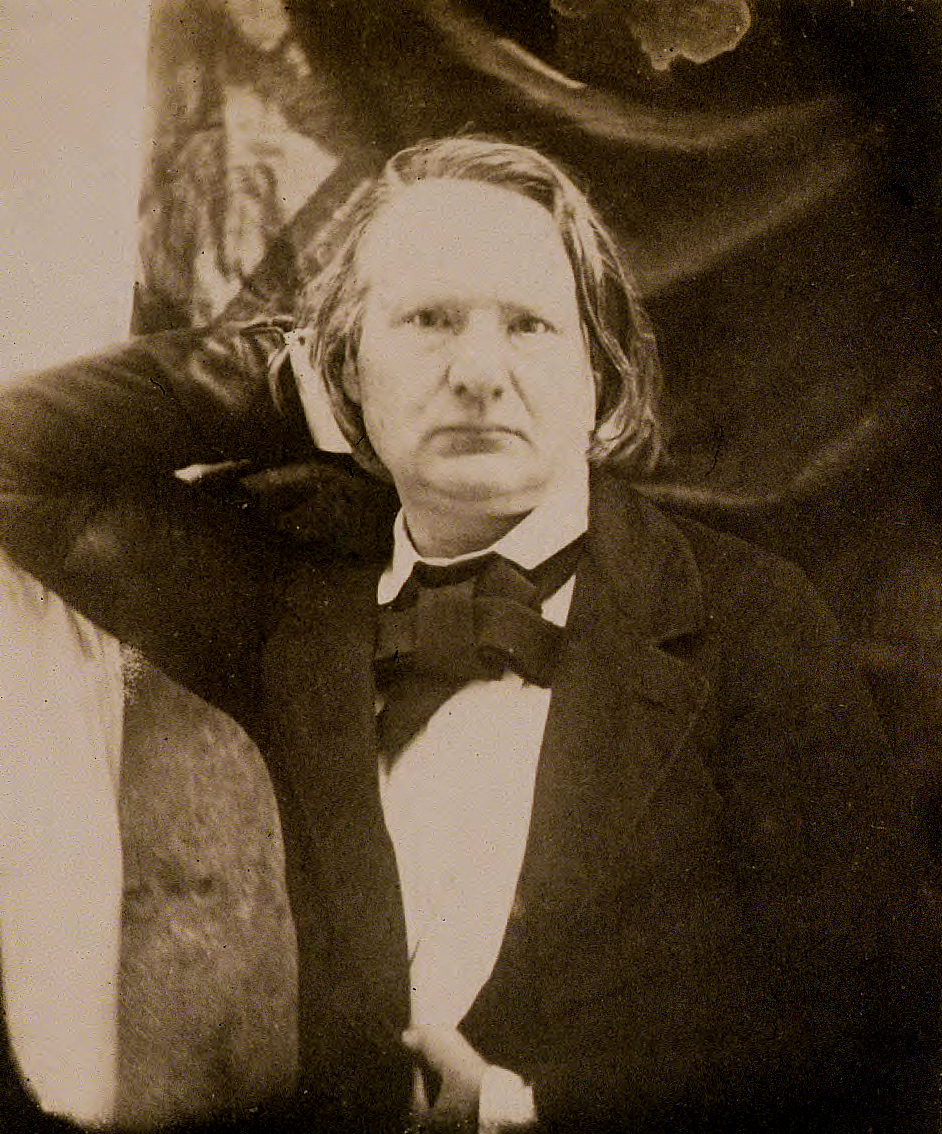
Victor Hugo

Baïf is often credited with the reintroduction of the alexandrine in the mid-16th century. Hugo declared the classical alexandrine to have been "dislocated" by his use of the alexandrin ternaire.

Although alexandrines occurred in French verse as early as the 12th century, they were slightly looser rhythmically, and vied with the décasyllabe and octosyllabe for cultural prominence and use in various genres. "The alexandrine came into its own in the middle of the sixteenth century with the poets of the Pléiade and was firmly established in the seventeenth century." It became the preferred line for the prestigious genres of epic and tragedy. The structure of the classical French alexandrine is

o o o o o S | o o o o o S (e)[6]

S=stressed syllable; (e)=optional mute e

Classical alexandrines are always rhymed, often in couplets alternating masculine rhymes and feminine rhymes, though other configurations (such as quatrains and sonnets) are also common.

Victor Hugo began the process of loosening the strict two-hemistich structure. While retaining the medial caesura, he often reduced it to a mere word-break, creating a three-part line (alexandrin ternaire) with this structure:

o o o S | o o ¦ o S | o o o S (e)

|=strong caesura; ¦=word break

The Symbolists further weakened the classical structure, sometimes eliminating any or all of these caesurae. However, at no point did the newer line replace the older; rather, they were used concurrently, often in the same poem. This loosening process eventually led to vers libéré and finally to vers libre.

== English ==
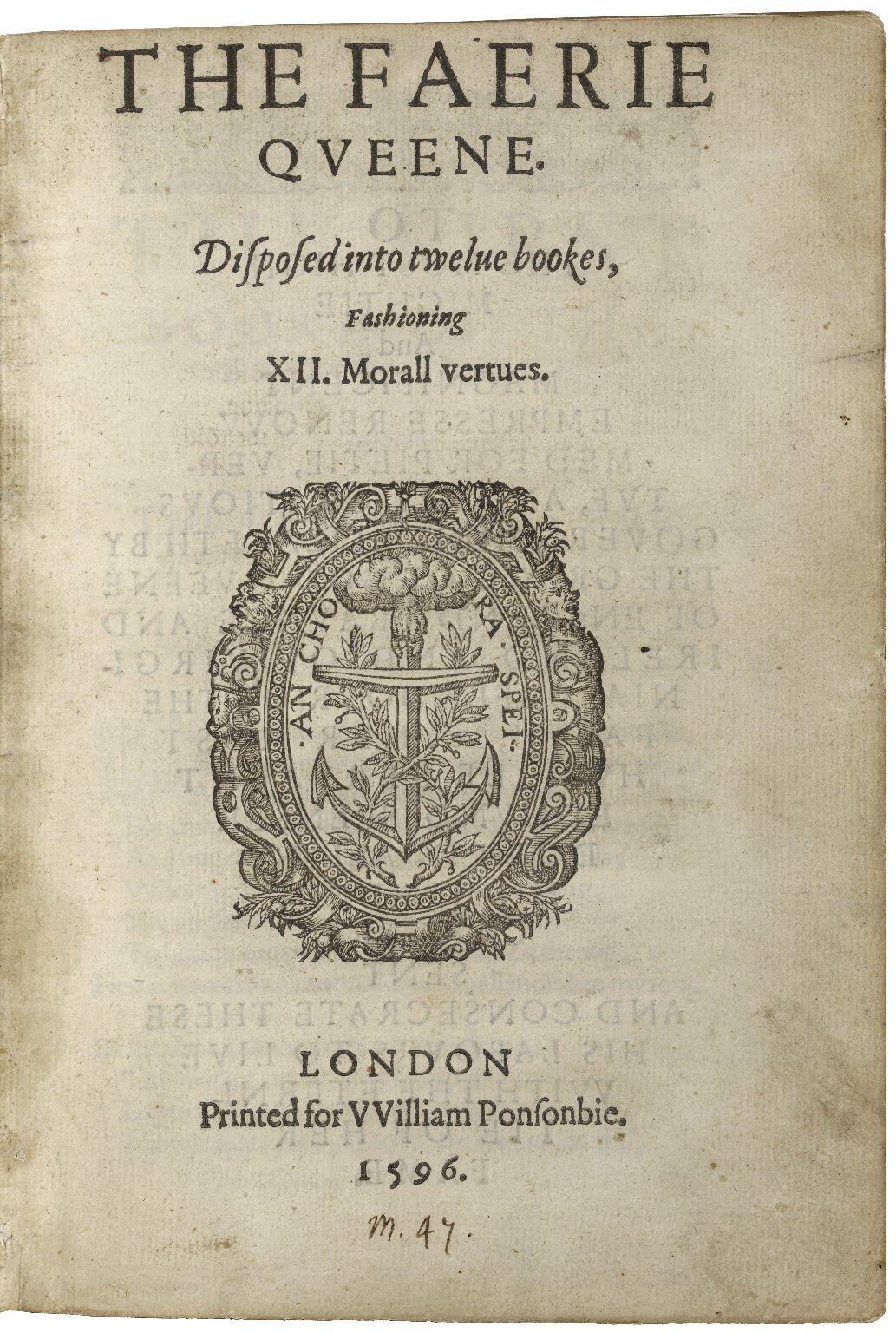
Title page of Spenser's Faerie Queene (1590/1596)

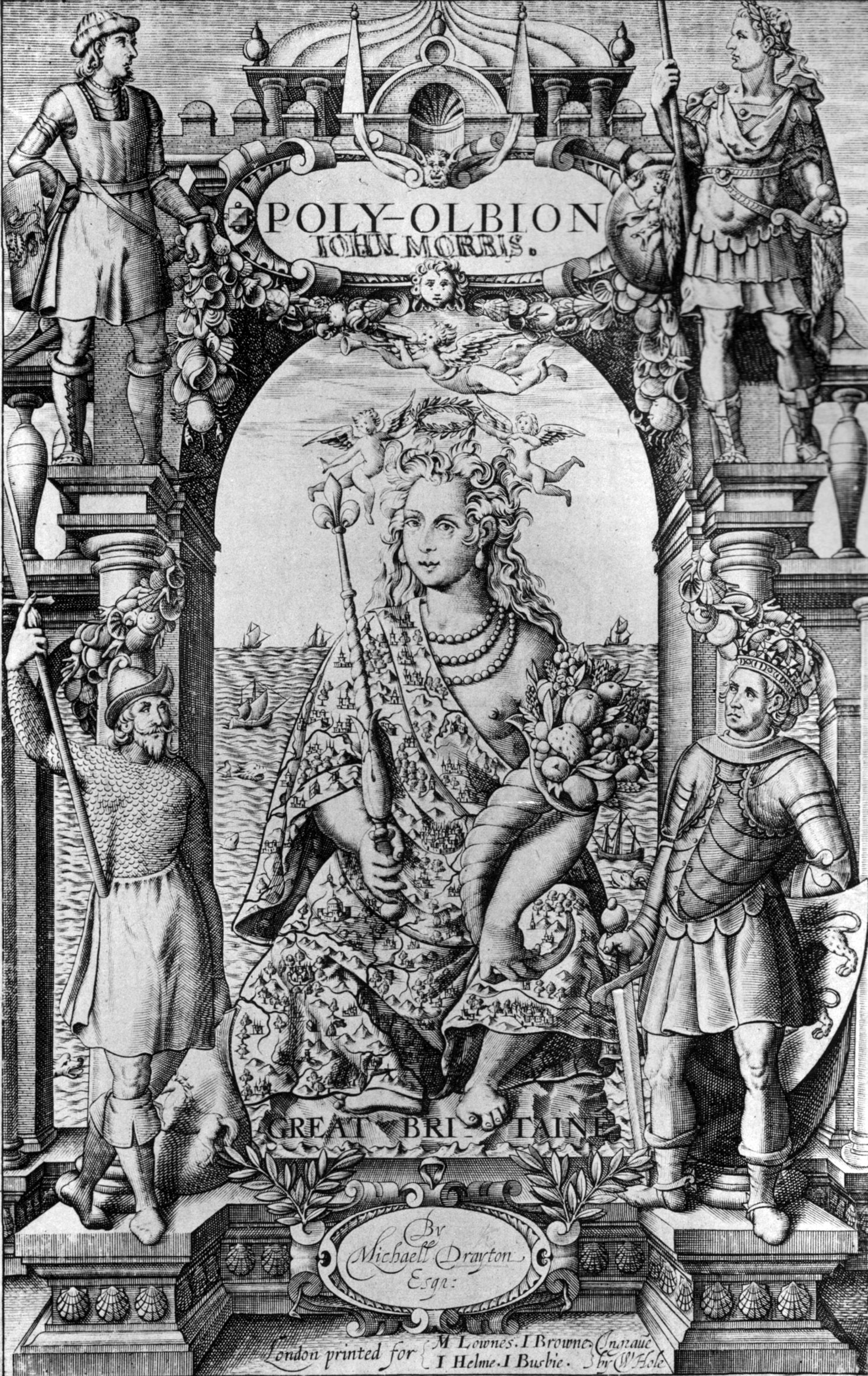
Title page of Drayton's Poly-Olbion (1612/1622)

Spenser added one alexandrine to his iambic pentameter stanza; Drayton composed the longest work entirely in English alexandrines.

In English verse, "alexandrine" is typically used to mean "iambic hexameter":

× / × / × / ¦ × / × / × / (×)

/=ictus, a strong syllabic position; ×=nonictus
¦=often a mandatory or predominant caesura, but depends upon the author

Whereas the French alexandrine is syllabic, the English is accentual-syllabic; and the central caesura (a defining feature of the French) is not always rigidly preserved in English.

Though English alexandrines have occasionally provided the sole metrical line for a poem, for example in lyric poems by Henry Howard, Earl of Surrey and Sir Philip Sidney, and in two notable long poems, Michael Drayton's Poly-Olbion and Robert Browning's Fifine at the Fair, they have more often featured alongside other lines. During the Middle Ages they typically occurred with heptameters (seven-beat lines), both exhibiting metrical looseness. Around the mid-16th century stricter alexandrines were popular as the first line of poulter's measure couplets, fourteeners (strict iambic heptameters) providing the second line.

The strict English alexandrine may be exemplified by a passage from Poly-Olbion, which features a rare caesural enjambment (symbolized ¦) in the first line:

Ye sacred Bards, that to ¦ your harps' melodious strings
Sung th'ancient Heroes' deeds (the monuments of Kings)
And in your dreadful verse ingrav'd the prophecies,
The agèd world's descents, and genealogies; (lines 31-34)

The Faerie Queene by Edmund Spenser, with its stanzas of eight iambic pentameter lines followed by one alexandrine, exemplifies what came to be its chief role: as a somewhat infrequent variant line in an otherwise iambic pentameter context. Alexandrines provide occasional variation in the blank verse of William Shakespeare and his contemporaries (but rarely; they constitute only about 1% of Shakespeare's blank verse). John Dryden and his contemporaries and followers likewise occasionally employed them as the second (rarely the first) line of heroic couplets, or even more distinctively as the third line of a triplet. In his Essay on Criticism, Alexander Pope denounced (and parodied) the excessive and unskillful use of this practice:

Then at the last and only couplet fraught
With some unmeaning thing they call a thought,
A needless Alexandrine ends the song,
That, like a wounded snake, drags its slow length along. (lines 354-357)

== Other languages ==
=== Spanish ===
The Spanish verso alejandrino is a line of 7+7 syllables, probably developed in imitation of the French alexandrine. Its structure is:

o o o o o S o | o o o o o S o

It was used beginning about 1200 for mester de clerecía (clerical verse), typically occurring in the cuaderna vía, a stanza of four alejandrinos all with a single end-rhyme.

The alejandrino was most prominent during the 13th and 14th centuries, after which time it was eclipsed by the metrically more flexible arte mayor. Juan Ruiz's Book of Good Love is one of the best-known examples of cuaderna vía, though other verse forms also appear in the work.

=== Dutch ===
The mid-16th-century poet Jan van der Noot pioneered syllabic Dutch alexandrines on the French model, but within a few decades Dutch alexandrines had been transformed into strict iambic hexameters with a caesura after the third foot. From the Low Countries the accentual-syllabic alexandrine spread to other continental literatures.

Als ick in liefde ben, dan ben ick als gebonden,
Als ick daer buyten ben, dan ben ick gans geschonden…
Wat doe ick doch aldus? ontbonden wil ick zijn,
Soo ick ontbonden ben, soo meerdert doch mijn pijn…

—Daniel Heinsius

Whenas I am in love, in fetters am I bound,
When I in love am not, shame doth me quite confound.
Say then, what shall I do? My freedom would I gain,
But when I freedom get the greater is my pain.

—Translated by Leofranc Holford-Strevens

=== German ===
Similarly, in early 17th-century Germany, Georg Rudolf Weckherlin advocated for an alexandrine with free rhythms, reflecting French practice; whereas Martin Opitz advocated for a strict accentual-syllabic iambic alexandrine in imitation of contemporary Dutch practice — and German poets followed Opitz. The alexandrine (strictly iambic with a consistent medial caesura) became the dominant long line of the German baroque.

=== Polish ===
Unlike many similar lines, the Polish alexandrine developed not from French verse but from Latin, specifically, the 13-syllable goliardic line:

Latin goliardic:    o o o s S s s | o o o s S s
Polish alexandrine: o o o o o S s | o o o s S s

s=unstressed syllable

Though looser instances of this (nominally) 13-syllable line were occasionally used in Polish literature, it was Mikołaj Rej and Jan Kochanowski who, in the 16th century, introduced the syllabically strict line as a vehicle for major works.

=== Czech ===
The Czech alexandrine is a comparatively recent development, based on the French alexandrine and introduced by Karel Hynek Mácha in the 19th century. Its structure forms a halfway point between features usual in syllabic and in accentual-syllabic verse, being more highly constrained than most syllabic verse, and less so than most accentual-syllabic verse. Moreover, it equally encourages the very different rhythms of iambic hexameter and dactylic tetrameter to emerge by preserving the constants of both measures:

iambic hexameter:    s S s S s S | s S s S s S (s)
dactylic tetrameter: S s s S s s | S s s S s s (s)
Czech alexandrine:   o o s S s o | o o s S s o (s)

=== Hungarian ===
Hungarian metrical verse may be written either syllabically (the older and more traditional style, known as "national") or quantitatively. One of the national lines has a 6+6 structure:

o o o o o o | o o o o o o

Although deriving from native folk versification, it is possible that this line, and the related 6-syllable line, were influenced by Latin or Romance examples. When employed in 4-line or 8-line stanzas and rhyming in couplets, this is called the Hungarian alexandrine; it is the Hungarian heroic verse form. Beginning with the 16th-century verse of Bálint Balassi, this became the dominant Hungarian verse form.
