= Verso de arte mayor =

Multiform verse in Spanish poetry

Verso de arte mayor (Spanish for 'verse of higher art', or in short 'arte mayor') refers to a multiform verse that appeared in Spanish poetry from the 14th century and has 9 or more syllables. The term 'verso de arte mayor' is also used for the 'pie de arte mayor', which is a verse composed of two hemistiches, each of which has a rhythmic accent at the beginning and the end, separated by two unstressed syllables.

Originally, it was - in contrast to the shorter 'verso de arte menor' (Spanish for 'verse of lower art') – a long verse of eight to 16 syllables, which later developed into a regular 12-syllable verse with four stressed syllables and a medial caesura.

The verso de arte mayor came to maturity in the 15th century with Juan de Mena’s didactical-allegorical epic poem “Laberinto de Fortuna” (1444). The couplets of this poem, the so-called “Octavas de Juan de Mena”, consisted each of eight arte mayor verses. In the 16th century, the verso de arte mayor gave way to the Italianate hendecasyllable.

== Literature ==
- Julio Saavedra Molina: El verso de arte mayor. Santiago de Chile 1946
- Martin J. Duffell: Modern metrical theory and the verso de arte mayor. London, 1999. ISBN 0-904188-41-8
- Stephen Cushman, Clare Cavanagh, Jahan Ramazani, Paul Rouzer (ed.). "The Princeton Encyclopedia of Poetry and Poetics: Fourth Edition." Princeton, 2012.
