= Laberinto de Fortuna =

Laberinto de Fortuna (Labyrinth of Fortune) is the major work of Juan de Mena (1411–1456), who completed the poem in 1444. It is an epic poem written in "arte mayor" (verses of 12 syllables). Though the title implies an examination of Fortune, the work is essentially a propagandistic piece in favor of Castilian political unity behind Álvaro de Luna, the court favorite of King Juan II of Castilla. It includes considerable social satire criticizing corrupt nobles and urging the king to take action against them. The Labyrinth was much read during the 15th and 16th centuries, although its linguistic and structural complexity led to the publication of a "glossed" version (in which explanatory notes follow each stanza) in 1499. The work is also known as Las treszientas (The Three-Hundred) because it consists of 300 stanzas (although some manuscripts include only 297).

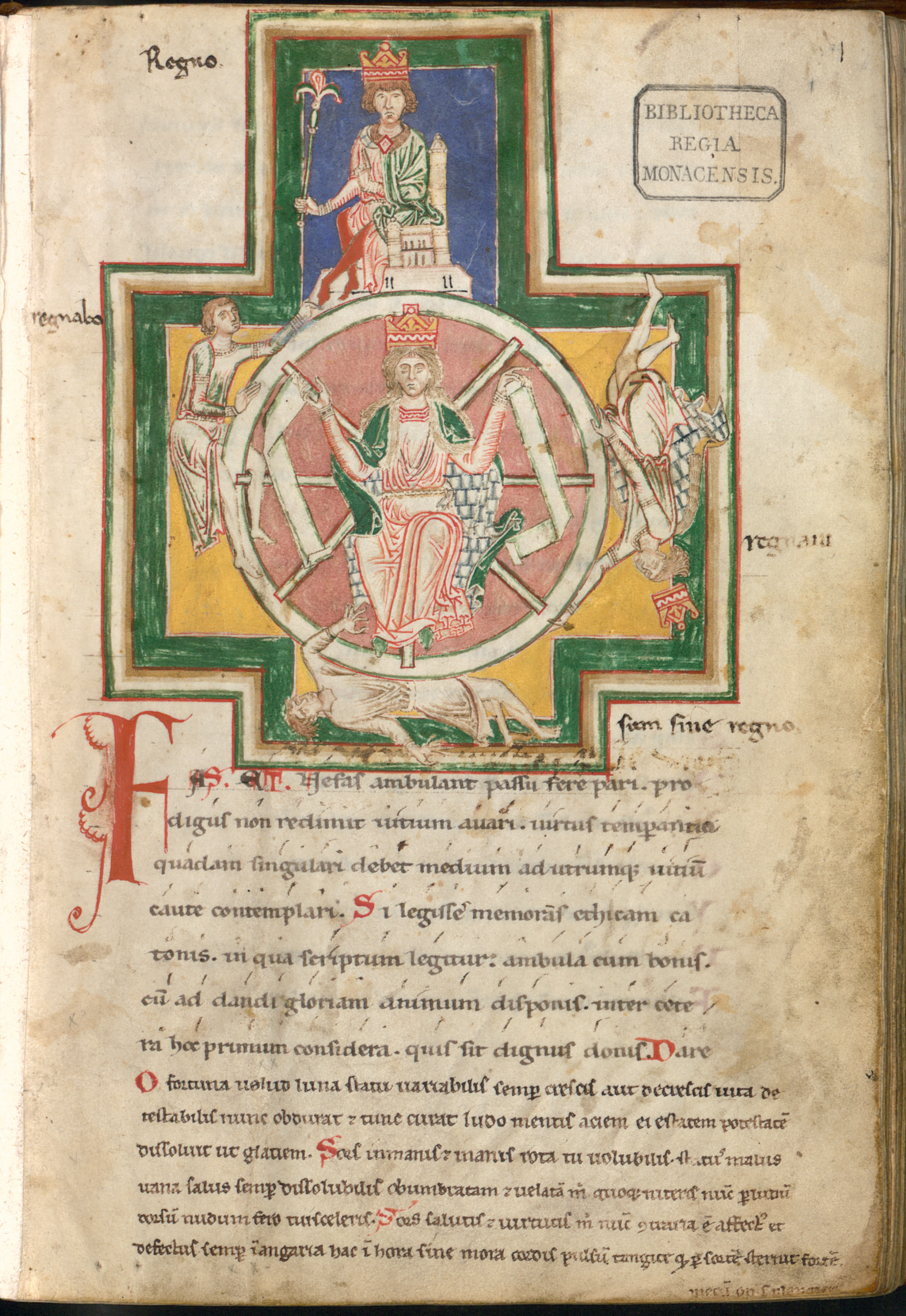
The Wheel of Fortune

== Summary ==
The plot is typical of the "vision poem" genre popular in the Middle Ages. The modern reader will recognize similarities to Dante's Inferno, also a vision poem. Mena himself is the narrator. He opens the poem with a lament about the "casos falaçes" of Fortune (unfortunate things that happen to people). He asks to see Fortune's home in order to better understand how she functions. After being whisked away by a dragon-pulled chariot, he is guided through Fortune's abode by Divine Providence (allegorized as a female character). There he sees not one Wheel of Fortune, but three, representing the past, present and future; each is composed of a series of Dante-like circles ruled by different planets. The circles contain examples of virtuous and unvirtuous historical figures. In the seventh circle, he encounters only one figure – Álvaro de Luna, who is seen as a horseman dominating Fortune, a wild horse. Having finished his tour of Fortune's home, the narrator asks Providence for a prophecy regarding King Juan II. Providence promises great glory for the king, but before she offers details the vision ends. The narrator concludes, admonishing the king to fulfill Providence's prophecy, and wondering whether the vision was just a dream.

== Language ==
The poem is written in "castellano" (Castilian), thus the language is basically an antiquated version of the Spanish spoken throughout the Hispanic world today. The "castellano" or Spanish of Mena's time is generally understandable to speakers of Spanish today and even to advanced non-native students of Spanish. Mena's language, however, is considerably more difficult. He uses many archaic words that even in his day had already fallen out of use. Even more often, he uses Latinisms. Some of the Latin words that Mena introduces were later adopted into Spanish, most were not. This linguistic experimentation creates a text that can only be read with great difficulty, and we may assume that Mena's contemporaries faced a similar difficulty. As medieval Spanish scholar Alan Deyermond states, "the precise meaning of some lines has baffled editors from the late-fifteenth-century…to the present".

== Structure ==
The structure of the poem is a mixture of two popular medieval allegorical elements: the Wheel of Fortune and the Ptolemaic universe. As mentioned above, the structure of the poem centers around three Wheels of Fortune (past, present and future). The first two wheels are visible to the narrator, while Providence leaves the third one veiled. Providence explains that the past and future wheels do not rotate, but the wheel for the present is still in motion, its outcome uncertain. On each wheel the narrator sees people from classical or Castilian history at varying levels of fortune. These different levels of fortune are represented by the Ptolemaic structure. Each wheel represents its own miniature of the Ptolemaic universe (the seven known celestial bodies with their allegorical connotations). The Ptolemaic element dominates the narrative structure of the poem, as the narration advances in order through the rings of the various planets. To sum up: We three Wheels of Fortune; each Wheel has seven rings representing a planet and its virtues; but, only two of the Wheels are visible to the narrator. On each ring there appear historical personages who either exemplify or lack the given virtue.

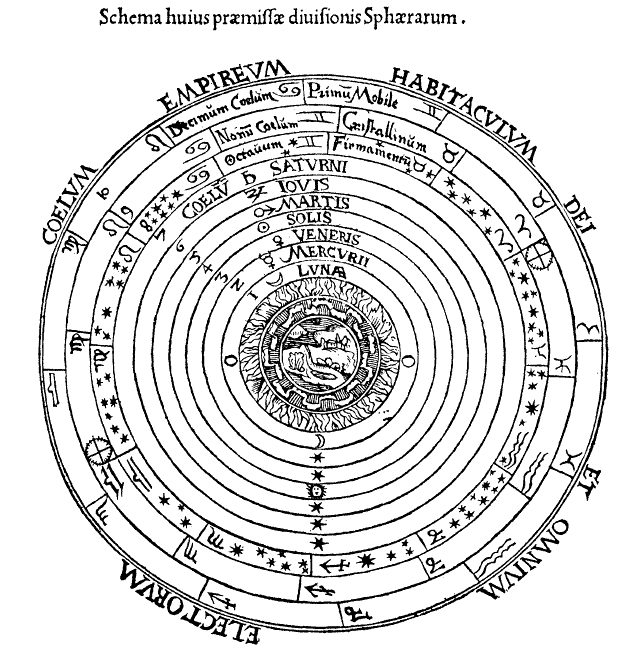
The Ptolemaic universe

== Structural problems ==
Mena's allegorical structure is complex, and may fail to make sense to a modern reader. Upon close analysis, we see that he does not follow the structural blueprint of wheels and circles that he outlines at the beginning of the work (Deyermond). Because his main concern is not the allegory of Fortune, but the political meaning of his work, he allows several structural problems to remain in the poem. First, his notion of three wheels (past, present and future) conflicts with the very metaphor of the Wheel of Fortune – that is, a wheel that represents past, present and future in the different points of its rotation. Providence explains that narrator will see the wheel of the present in motion (symbolic of the unfinished nature of the present lives) – in fact, the wheel is presented as stationary. A second problem is that the wheel in fact does not include characters from the present, but rather from the recent past. Of all the Laberinto's characters, only the narrator, Juan II and Álvaro de Luna were alive at the time of composition. Political prudence led Mena to fill his wheel of the present with figures from the recent past, thus avoiding a backlash from offended power-brokers. Undoubtedly the greatest inconsistency is that the Wheels turn out not to symbolize the blindness of Fortune at all; instead they represent the reward for virtuous action and the punishment for vice. They show not an unpredictable and changing system (Fortune) but its opposite, a well-defined and permanent moral structure. Thus the work, originally presented as a discussion of Fortune, avoids the topic all together. Finally, the Ptolemaic rings and the Wheels of Fortune cannot be combined in a way that makes visual or conceptual sense (Deyermond). By the final circle, Mena ignores his established structure and replaces it with praise for Álvaro de Luna. While perhaps not a flaw, it is certainly worth mentioning that the Laberinto actually contains no labyrinth. Fortune's abode is presented as a house, and as we have seen, it contains not a labyrinth, but rather three wheels and their rings. Scholars generally agree that the "labyrinth" is a reference to the political situation of Castile at the time (full of intrigue, difficult to navigate), but the work itself is silent on this point.

== Propagandistic value ==
Considering the fundamental structural problems and the troublesome lexicon, we might wonder why this poem was so respected in its time and continues to be studied today. At least part of the answer lies in the work's function. Because the central purpose of the work is to serve as political propaganda, its allegorical weaknesses don't appear so important. If the reader understands the political message, Mena has achieved his goal. Scholars generally accept that Mena delivered the poem to Juan II in person in 1444. The poem intends to be a Spanish epic, an inspiration to nationhood that presents Castilla's destiny (unity and the Reconquista) in epic terms, and leaves no doubt that Luna is the epic hero to whom the task should be entrusted. Its complex structure and vocabulary are designed to appeal to Juan II, who wrote poetry himself and was a patron to many poets. Mena's difficult poem aims to flatter its very specific audience, thus winning over the king, convincing him to continue support for Álvaro de Luna. In what is undoubtedly the most memorable moment of the work, Luna "cavalga sobre la fortuna" (rides astride Fortune). Fortune is presented as a wild horse tamed by the heroic Luna.

== Historical implications ==
Mena's work may have achieved its propagandistic goals in the short-term. Mena presented the poem to the king in 1444 at a time of crisis, when Juan II was being held under house arrest by his rival cousins of Aragón and Navarra. Perhaps in part inspired by the poem, the king once again backed Luna, and this favorite reached his peak of power after the First Battle of Olmedo in 1445. Nevertheless, in 1453 Luna was beheaded by order of the king, and Juan II himself died not long after. Mena's final years were spent with the knowledge that his political goals had not, in the end, been achieved. And yet, the work itself survived and thrived, partly because of the political debate which developed around the figure of Álvaro de Luna. It is now considered one of the most important works of late-medieval Spain.

== Imitations ==
Laberinto de Fortuna inspired an extremely bawdy parody, Carajicomedia (Dick Comedy), written 1516–1519. This social satire was quickly suppressed, being published only once. It was recovered by a Spanish Quaker in the 19th century. It adeptly reproduces the rhyme scheme and meter of the Laberinto and parodies its plot.

== Sources ==
- Deyermond, Alan. "Structure and Style as Instruments of Propaganda in Juan de Mena's Laberinto de Fortuna." Proceedings of the PMR Conference: Annual Publication of the International Patristic, Mediaeval and Renaissance Conference 5 (1980): 159–67.
- Dominguez, Frank A. Carajicomedia: Parody and Satire in Early Modern Spain, with and Edition and Translation of the Text. London and Rochester: Tamesis, 2015.
- Gericke, Philip O. "Juan de Mena (1411–1456)." Castilian Writers, 1400–1500. Edited by Frank A. Domínguez and George D. Greenia. Vol. 286. Detroit, MI: Gale, 2004. 109–126.
- Hutcheson, Gregory S. "Cracks in the Labyrinth: Juan de Mena, Converso Experience, and the Rise of the Spanish Nation." La corónica: A Journal of Medieval Spanish Language and Literature 25.1 (1996): 37–52.
- Nieto Soria, José Manuel. "Apología y propaganda de la realeza en los cancioneros castellanos del siglo XV. Diseño literario de un modelo político". En la España Medieval 11 (1988): 185–221.
