= Juan de Mena =

Spanish poet

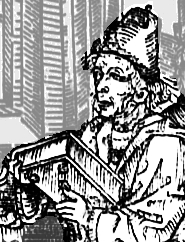
Juan de Mena, engraving of a Zaragoza edition (Jorge Coci, 1509) of Laberinto de Fortuna.

Juan de Mena (1411–1456) was one of the most significant Spanish poets of the fifteenth century. He was highly regarded at the court of Juan II de Castilla, who appointed him veinticuatro (one of twenty-four aldermen) of Córdoba, secretario de cartas latinas (secretary of Latin letters) and cronista real (royal chronicler). His works show the influence of Renaissance humanism and place him in the period of transition in Spain from the Middle Ages to the Renaissance.

== Biography ==
There is scant evidence about the early part of Mena's life, but most modern scholars agree that he was born at Córdoba, Spain, his father died shortly after his birth, and his mother a few years later. He was likely the second of two sons and was related to a former veinticuatro of Córdoba, although it is unclear how. Memorias de algunos linages (An Account of Some Lineages), attributed to Mena, claims that his family came from the valley of Mena in La Montaña, a region of the northern Spanish province of Cantabria, and served under Fernando III de Castilla and his successors in the Reconquista. His formal education probably began in Córdoba and later continued in Salamanca, where he appears to have fulfilled the requirements for the Master of Arts degree. He then traveled to Rome, perhaps as a continued part of his education, although there is no evidence that he participated in formal study there. During this trip and a later one to Florence, Mena appears to have been seeking ecclesiastical benefices; however, both attempts were fruitless and each was followed by a marriage, first to a supposed sister of García y Lope de Vaca and, secondly, to Marina Méndez, more than 20 years his minor. Neither marriage resulted in descendants for the poet. Some scholars have pointed to a possible converso origin for Mena's family, but others have found these claims to be highly speculative. Mena continued in the role of cronista real under Enrique IV de Castilla until his death at Torrelaguna in 1456, although he apparently did not write any chronicle.

== Works ==
Mena was considered by his contemporaries to be the outstanding poet of his time, and his knowledge of Latin and the Classics was greatly admired. His activities at the court of Juan II brought him into contact with many important figures; the most significant friendship that resulted was with Íñigo López de Mendoza. It persisted until the end of Mena's life despite important political differences.

His poetry frequently appeared in cancioneros (collections of verse), such as the Cancionero general of Hernando del Castillo, and his works were well known throughout the sixteenth century, influencing later Spanish poets, such as Garcilaso de la Vega, Fernando de Herrera and Luis de Góngora. The extensive commentary that accompanied later editions of Mena's Laberinto de Fortuna, such as those of Hernán Núñez (1499) and Francisco Sánchez de las Brozas (1582), provide further evidence of the extent of his literary influence in Spain. His style is marked by its frequent use of Latinisms and hyperbaton, as well as by mentions of a wide array of figures from Greco-Roman mythology. In his imitation of classical and medieval sources, such as Dante, Mena helped stretch the capabilities of a fledgling Castilian literary tradition, paving the way for later poets. It is largely due to the awkwardness and weight of his style and lexicon that his influence began to wane in the seventeenth and eighteenth centuries and fell out of favor with nineteenth-century critics. Modern critics have reinstated Mena's importance to Spain's literary history and consider him to be one of the three major poets of the fifteenth century, along with Íñigo López de Mendoza and Jorge Manrique.

=== La Coronaçión ===
Mena wrote La Coronaçión (or Calamicleos, The Coronation, 1438) and dedicated it to Íñigo López de Mendoza, marqués de Santillana (marquis of Santillana), in response to the latter's 1438 victory on the frontier between Muslim and Christian Spain, which resulted in the taking of Huelma. Although a relatively minor victory, it was the first successful campaign of the Reconquista since 1431. The poem consists of 51 stanzas recounting a dream sequence in which the poet first sees historical and mythological figures being punished for their vices or their failure to act, and later sees those figures who have earned a place on Mount Parnassus for their virtues; principal among those praised is the marqués de Santillana.

Although Santillana was also well known as a poet, he is praised in the poem as an exemplar of the four cardinal virtues. The poem is allegorical in nature and corresponds to Mena's idea of satire in that it condemns vice and praises virtue. It is possible to interpret the Reconquista and national unity as the principal themes of the poem; one of Mena's lesson seems to be that internal strife is a vice that hinders the Christian reconquest of Spain.

In the original version of La Coronaçión Juan de Mena included extensive commentary, in highly ornamental and Latinate prose. The commentary addresses each stanza and explains mythological references, as well as the poem's moral-allegorical function. Such commentary was ordinarily reserved for the Classics.

=== Laberinto de Fortuna ===
Laberinto de Fortuna ("Labyrinth of Fortune", 1444) is Mena's masterpiece. The structure of the poem is a mixture of two popular medieval allegorical elements: the Wheel of Fortune and the Ptolemaic universe. The structure of the poem centers around three Wheels of Fortune (past, present and future). The 297 stanza poem (also known as Las Trecientas (The Three Hundred), as there are versions with three additional stanzas) reintroduces the themes of national unity and the Reconquista but is dedicated to Juan II.

=== Lyric poetry ===
In addition to his moral-political works, Mena also produced more traditional courtly poetry. There are fifty or so surviving examples of Mena's lyric poetry, including love lyrics, occasional verses, satirical pieces, and exchanges with other poets. The minor lyrics are far less complex than his major works in both style and content. His love poetry was well respected for its originality and treatment of the nature of love's passion as an abstract, intellectual experience.

=== Other works ===
Other works include a translation of the Ilias latina, the Latin version of Homer's Iliad, into Spanish (ca. 1442), Tratado sobre el título de duque (Treatise on the Title of Duke, 1445), a prologue to Álvaro de Luna's Libro de las virtuosas e claras mugeres (Book of Virtuous and Illustrious Women), and Coplas de los pecados mortales (Stanzas on the Deadly Sins, unfinished, 1456). Tratado de amor (Treatise on Love, ca. 1444) and Memorias de algunos linages or Memorias genealógicas (An Account of Some Lineages, 1448) are also attributed to de Mena.
