= Skyscraper Live =

Skyscraper Live may refer to:

- Skyscraper Live (2014), featuring Nik Wallenda tightrope walking in Chicago
- Skyscraper Live (2026), featuring Alex Honnold climbing Taipei 101
