= Helen Kreis Wallenda =

German-born trapeze artist (1910–1996 )

- Born: December 11, 1910; Germany
- Died: May 9, 1996 (aged 85); Sarasota, Florida, United States
- Occupations: Trapeze artist, aerialist
- Spouse: Karl Wallenda
- Children: Carla Wallenda Guzman, Jenny Wallenda Anderson, Mario Wallenda
- Relatives: Rietta Grotefent (sister)

Helen Kreis Wallenda (December 11, 1910 – May 9, 1996) was a German-born trapeze artist and aerialist, best known as a key member of the original four-member Great Wallendas high-wire troupe. She was the wife of the high-wire artist Karl Wallenda, and together they performed daring acts without a safety net. Kreis was often the pinnacle of the Wallenda pyramid.

== Early life and career ==
Kreis was born on December 11, 1910, in Germany. She joined the Wallenda troupe, led by her future husband, Karl Wallenda, at the age of 16. In 1928, she made her debut as the pinnacle of the Wallenda pyramid during a performance at Madison Square Garden, which earned the troupe a standing ovation that lasted for 11 minutes.

The Wallendas traced their high-wire heritage back to the 1600s and were known for performing high-wire acts between skyscrapers, over canyons, and between speeding cars. Kreis and Wallenda married in 1935 and continued to perform together, along with other members of the Wallenda family.

== Later life and death ==
Kreis retired from performing in 1956. In 1962, an accident occurred when a seven-member Wallenda pyramid collapsed in Detroit, resulting in the deaths of two troupe members and the paralysis of her son, Mario. In 1964, her sister Rietta Grotefent also died in a fall from the high wire.

Kreis continued to support her family and its high-wire legacy, even assisting her son-in-law, Mike Morgan, in learning the wire act at the age of 72. She lived in Sarasota, Florida, with her family, caring for her grandchildren while the rest of the family was on tour.

She died on May 9, 1996, in Sarasota, Florida, at the age of 85, survived by her three children, Carla Wallenda Guzman, Jenny Wallenda Anderson, and Mario Wallenda, as well as several grandchildren and great-grandchildren.
