= Eaten Alive (TV program) =

American nature documentary special

- The title card of the special
- Genre: Documentary
- Starring: Paul Rosolie
- Country of origin: United States
- Original language: English

Production
- Executive producers: Michael Sorensen; Matthew Kelly
- Producer: Meagan Davis
- Production locations: Puerto Maldonado, Peru
- Running time: 85 minutes
- Production company: Expedition Amazon

Original release
- Network: Discovery Channel
- Release: December 7, 2014

Eaten Alive is an American nature documentary special which aired on Discovery Channel on December 7, 2014. The special focused on an expedition by wildlife author and entertainer Paul Rosolie to locate a green anaconda named "Chumana", which he believed to be the world's longest, in a remote location of the Amazon rainforest in the Puerto Maldonado, Peru.

The special was also purportedly to feature Rosolie being "eaten" by an anaconda, protected by a suit designed specifically for this purpose. He attempted to feed himself to an anaconda, and the snake did attack, but did not swallow Rosolie as the title of the special implied. The stunt itself was called off due to safety concerns.

After its premiere, Eaten Alive was widely criticized for false advertising. One critic compared the special to The Mystery of Al Capone's Vaults — a television event that ended with a similarly disappointing outcome that did not meet promoted expectations.

Though Rosolie stated that the special was intended to draw attention to wildlife conservation and the destruction of the Amazon, the special was condemned prior to its premiere by critics and the animal rights group PETA as an inhumane publicity stunt oriented towards shock value, resulting in calls for Discovery Channel to pull the special.

== Synopsis ==
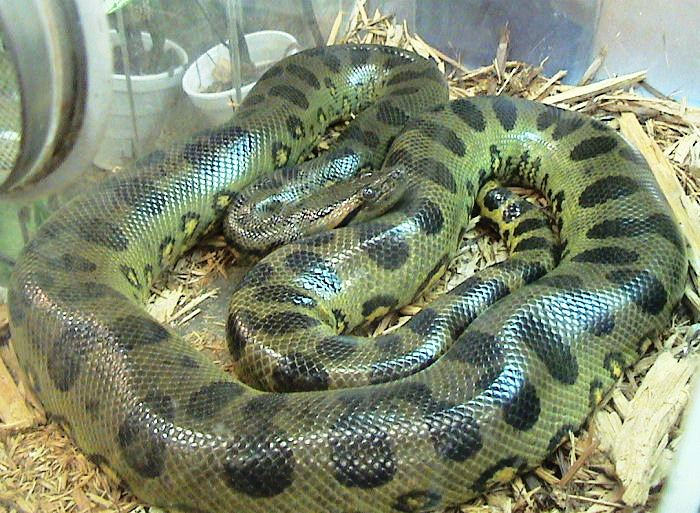
Green anaconda (Eunectes murinus)

Eaten Alive focused primarily on Rosolie's expedition to the "Floating Forest", a remote area of the Amazon rainforest, to search for and capture a large green anaconda named "Chumana", which he believed was longer than 24 feet (7.3 m), the length of the world's longest known anaconda. His eventual goal was to be "eaten" by the snake in an effort to promote wildlife conservation. Rosolie and his crew were unable to find Chumana, but he continued with his goal of being "eaten" by an anaconda. Rosolie was supplied with a captive, 20 foot (6.1 m) anaconda for use in the stunt, and he equipped himself with a specially designed protective suit, which was doused in pig blood as bait. As it had affected his range of motion, Rosolie removed some of the padding from his suit that protected his arms. While the snake would constrict him and attempt to bite his head, Rosolie halted the stunt after an hour, showing concern that the anaconda's wrap would break his arm.

In regards to the outcome, Rosolie explained that the anaconda "[got] my arm into a position where her force was fully on my exposed arm. I started to feel the blood drain out of my hand, and I felt the bone flex. And when I got to the point where I felt like it was going to snap, I had to tap out."

== Development ==
A teaser for Eaten Alive was first broadcast during Discovery Channel's telecast of Nik Wallenda's high wire crossings in Chicago on November 2, 2014. The special purported to feature Paul Rosolie being "eaten" by, and retrieved from, a live anaconda. Shortly afterward, Discovery Channel released further information surrounding the special, including a statement by Rosolie. He explained that Eaten Alive was intended to draw attention to wildlife conservation, stating:

I've seen first-hand how the Amazon rainforest is being destroyed. It is so rampant that we may be the last generation with the opportunity to save it. People need to wake up to what is going on. What better way is there to shock people than to put my life on the line with the largest snake on the planet, the Green Anaconda?

The statements also implied his survival of the stunt, as the special had already been filmed.

Rosolie wore a "custom-built snake-proof suit" whilst performing the stunt to keep both him and the snake safe, and to counter threats that would be encountered during the stunt. The suit consisted of multiple layers of equipment, including a cooling vest to control his body temperature, a Tychem suit to protect against stomach acid, a mix of carbon fiber and chainmail armor to protect against impact and bites, and an externally supplied oxygen mask covered by a carbon fiber helmet. The suit was designed to withstand up to 300 psi (20 atm) of pressure, about three times stronger than the grip of an anaconda, which is estimated to only be around 90 psi (6.1 atm). Rosolie also ingested a wireless device which allowed his crew to monitor his vital signs.

Eaten Alive proved to be controversial even before its premiere, attracting criticism from animal rights groups such as People for the Ethical Treatment of Animals (PETA), who argued that Rosolie's stunt was an example of animal cruelty, while an online petition on Change.org urging Discovery Channel to pull the special reached over 25,000 signatures. PETA objected to the use of an animal for "entertainment", and went on to say that "making this snake use up energy by swallowing this fool and then possibly regurgitating him would have left the poor animal exhausted and deprived of the energy that he or she needs. Shame on this pseudo 'wildlife expert' for tormenting this animal, and shame on the Discovery Channel for giving him the incentive to do so."

== Broadcast and reception ==
Eaten Alive premiered on December 7, 2014, kicking off a special week of programming on Discovery Channel known as "Mega Week", which the network promoted as a "weeklong celebration of all things Discovery." The special was seen by 4.1 million viewers, making it Discovery Channel's highest-rated nature program since Life in 2010. It was also the second-most popular television program of the night on social media, behind Sunday Night Football.

Prior to the broadcast, alongside similar concerns for the well-being of the snake, Laura Bradley of Slate argued that Eaten Alive was a further example of Discovery Channel's recent uses of sensationalism and pseudoscience to attract viewers, as opposed to airing content that is legitimately educational. She compared the special to Shark Week (which she described as the network's "biggest pieces of viewer bait" for "capitalizing on people's fear of sharks while simultaneously misinforming the public about an animal that is actually in danger"), the aforementioned Nik Wallenda specials, and fictitious mermaid documentaries broadcast by sister network Animal Planet.

Following its broadcast, Eaten Alive was widely criticized by viewers and the media for false advertising, as the majority of the two-hour special dealt with the search for Chumana, and as the anaconda did not swallow him as was advertised. Although promotional material on Discovery Channel's website claimed that Rosolie would enter the anaconda, its press release for the special stated that there was only a possibility that he would. Reaction to the special on social media was negative, with comparisons being drawn to the online practice of clickbait. On an episode of the Lex Friedman podcast, Rosolie shares that he watched the documentary for the first time a day before he was to appear on a late-night show to promote the documentary and was threatened by the network in order to continue to appear on the late-night show. Rosolie also mentions that the name of the documentary was altered from 'Expedition Amazon' to 'Eaten Alive', which he felt detracted from the notion of conservation.

Writing for The Guardian, Brian Moylan compared Eaten Alive to The Mystery of Al Capone's Vaults—Geraldo Rivera's infamous live television special that featured the 1986 opening of a secret vault once owned by Al Capone, which was purported to contain valuable items but ended up only containing debris. Moylan believed that much like the vault, "Rosolie is also nothing more than a lot of dust and a few empty Coke bottles." However, he did praise the style of the remainder of the special, comparing it to a horror movie and describing it as being "much more dramatic and much better than it needed to be, which is a considerable accomplishment."

PETA made further remarks criticizing Discovery Channel's decision to go on with the special despite its earlier objections, arguing that "study after study has shown that entertainment features such as this one that show humans interfering with and handling wild animals are detrimental to species conservation. Rosolie knows this. Discovery knows this. Yet they chose to contrive and air this shameful stunt for ratings anyway." In a statement following the broadcast, Discovery Channel re-affirmed that the safety of Rosolie and the anaconda were a top priority, and that he "created this challenge to get maximum attention for one of the most beautiful and threatened parts of the world, the Amazon Rainforest and its wildlife. He went to great lengths to send this message and it was his absolute intention to be eaten alive."

1-800 Contacts broadcast a new commercial, featuring a character having been eaten by a snake, during Eaten Alive. The ad was produced in advance of the special's announcement, and was intended to premiere in January 2015, but the company's agency Pereira & O'Dell moved up the premiere after learning of the special. The dialogue of the ad was also amended in reference to the special, with the character remarking that he hoped his predicament would "make [him] famous." On Twitter, the company jokingly noted that unlike Eaten Alive, "someone was actually inside the snake."

== See also ==
- List of television shows notable for negative reception
