= Mario Wallenda =

American acrobat (1940–2015)

- Born: May 6, 1940
- Died: April 12, 2015 (aged 74)
- Occupations: acrobat, highwire artiste
- Years active: 1947-2000s
- Father: Karl Wallenda
- Relatives: Nik Wallenda
- Family: The Flying Wallendas

Mario Wallenda (May 6, 1940 – April 12, 2015) was an American acrobat and highwire artiste, a member of The Flying Wallendas from 1947 to 1962. He was the adopted son of Karl Wallenda.

He was paralyzed on January 30, 1962, when their trademark seven-person pyramid collapsed in the Michigan State Fairgrounds Coliseum.

Wallenda claimed that, after his paralysis, his father made plans to adapt a wheelchair to the high-wire act, but Wallenda refused the idea. However, he later returned to the wire on a specialty two-wheeled, electric vehicle called the “sky cycle."

Wallenda was married to his wife, Linda, from 1963 until her death in 2014. He died on April 12, 2015 at the age of 74.
