= Paul Rosolie =

American conservationist and author

- Education: Ramapo College
- Occupations: Conservationist; author
- Years active: 2005–present
- Notable work: Mother of God
- Spouses: Gowri Varanashi (m. 2013–2020); Nikita Skariah (m. 2022–2024); Vajra Kingsley Rosolie (m. 2025)
- Website: paulrosolie.com

Paul Rosolie is an American conservationist, author, and the founder of Junglekeepers, a nonprofit organization working to protect rainforests in Peru's Madre de Dios region. His 2014 memoir, Mother of God, detailed his early work in the Amazon rainforest in southeastern Peru. He is known for his conservation work in the Madre de Dios region of Peru. His latest book, Junglekeeper, (2026), follows his journey building Junglekeepers.

== Career ==
Rosolie dropped out of high school during his sophomore year and pursued his education at college instead. His long-standing interest in rainforests led him to an Amazon research station in Peru's Madre de Dios at the age of 18 in 2005. That year, he also traveled to the Atlantic Forest through a study abroad program with Columbia University.

In 2007, Rosolie helped create Tamandua Expeditions, an ecotourism company that offers trips to the Las Piedras Biodiversity Station on the Las Piedras River. Money raised from that endeavor is used to protect a patch of untouched forest.

He earned his undergraduate degree in environmental studies from Ramapo College in New Jersey in 2010. While studying, he frequently flew back to Peru during breaks and worked with Tamandua Expeditions.

In 2013, Rosolie published a short film on YouTube that showed footage of dozens of species of wild animals in the Madre de Dios forests, captured by various camera traps. Titled An Unseen World, it won the short film contest at the 2013 United Nations Forum on Forests.

Rosolie also spent time in India researching tiger conservation.

In March 2014, he published his first book, Mother of God: An Extraordinary Journey into the Uncharted Tributaries of the Western Amazon, through HarperCollins. It details his life, experiences, and conservation efforts in the Amazon.

In December 2014, he was the host of the Discovery Channel nature documentary special Eaten Alive. During the program, Rosolie was purportedly going to be swallowed alive by a green anaconda while wearing a custom-made protective suit. While the anaconda did coil around him, Rosolie was never actually swallowed. The show received criticism from viewers and animal rights organizations, but Rosolie maintained that he intended to raise money and bring broader public attention to the deforestation, gold mining, and hunting that threaten the anaconda's habitat. He also said he was unaware that the Discovery Channel would cut a majority of the conservation-related content from the show.

In 2015, Rosolie started spending more time on conservation efforts in India. In 2017, he studied the migration habits of tigers and elephants in the forests of Wayanad. As of 2018, he spent four months of the year in southern India and split the remainder of his time between Peru and New York City.

In 2019, he published his second book, The Girl and the Tiger. A novel, it is based on the true story of an Indian girl who contacted Rosolie after finding three abandoned tiger cubs.

In 2015, Rosolie co-founded Junglekeepers with Juan Julio Durand, a member of the Infierno indigenous community, to protect forest land along the Las Piedras River watershed in the Madre de Dios region of Peru. The organization purchases land ahead of logging operations and employs former loggers and gold miners as forest rangers. As of 2026, Junglekeepers has protected approximately 47,000 hectares (117,000 acres), with a stated goal of protecting 121,000 hectares (300,000 acres) and eventually establishing a national park.

In January 2026, Rosolie published his third book, Junglekeeper: What It Takes to Change the World, which appeared on the New York Times Best Sellers list. The watershed is home to nomadic Indigenous groups including the Nomolé, also referred to as the Mashco Piro, who have had limited contact with the outside world. Rosolie has described the ethical challenges of balancing the protection of these groups' autonomy with concerns about their welfare, and has engaged an anthropologist to advise on best practices.

== Books ==
Year	Title	Original publisher	ISBN
2014	Mother of God: An Extraordinary Journey into the Uncharted Tributaries of the Western Amazon	HarperCollins	ISBN 9780062259516
2019	The Girl and the Tiger	Owl Hollow Press	ISBN 9781945654312
2026	Junglekeeper: What It Takes to Change the World	Convergent Books	ISBN 9780593980392

== Film ==
Year	Title	Role	Notes	Ref.
2021	Dark Green	Self		
2014	Eaten Alive	Self	Rosolie uses a custom-built snake-proof suit to enter the belly of an anaconda, but essentially gets an aggressive hug.	
