= Circus Flora =

One-ring circus based in Missouri, US

Origin
- Country: United States
- Founder(s): Ivor David Balding, Sheila and Sam Jewell, and Alexandre Sacha Pavlata
- Year founded: 1986

Information
- Director: Jack Marsh
- Circus tent?: Yes
- Website: https://circusflora.org

Circus Flora is a one-ring circus based in St. Louis, Missouri, United States. It is a non-profit organization. Circus Flora has become a touring show yet it performs annually in St. Louis, usually at the beginning of the month of June. It combines the venue of a one-ring circus with the performance trappings of theatre. Performances include aerialists, equestrian artists, acrobats, and trained animals. Each performance is accompanied by a live band. Live musicians allow the mood to be tailored to the live events happening in the ring — down to every crash of the cymbal or beat of the snare drum.

Circus Flora is styled after old Eastern-European circuses. For many years, Circus Flora has featured many and various members of the renowned Flying Wallendas family. The St. Louis Post-Dispatch described the 2007 performance as, "an entertaining mixture of thoroughly professional performances and 'Let's put on a show in the old barn.'"

== Early years ==
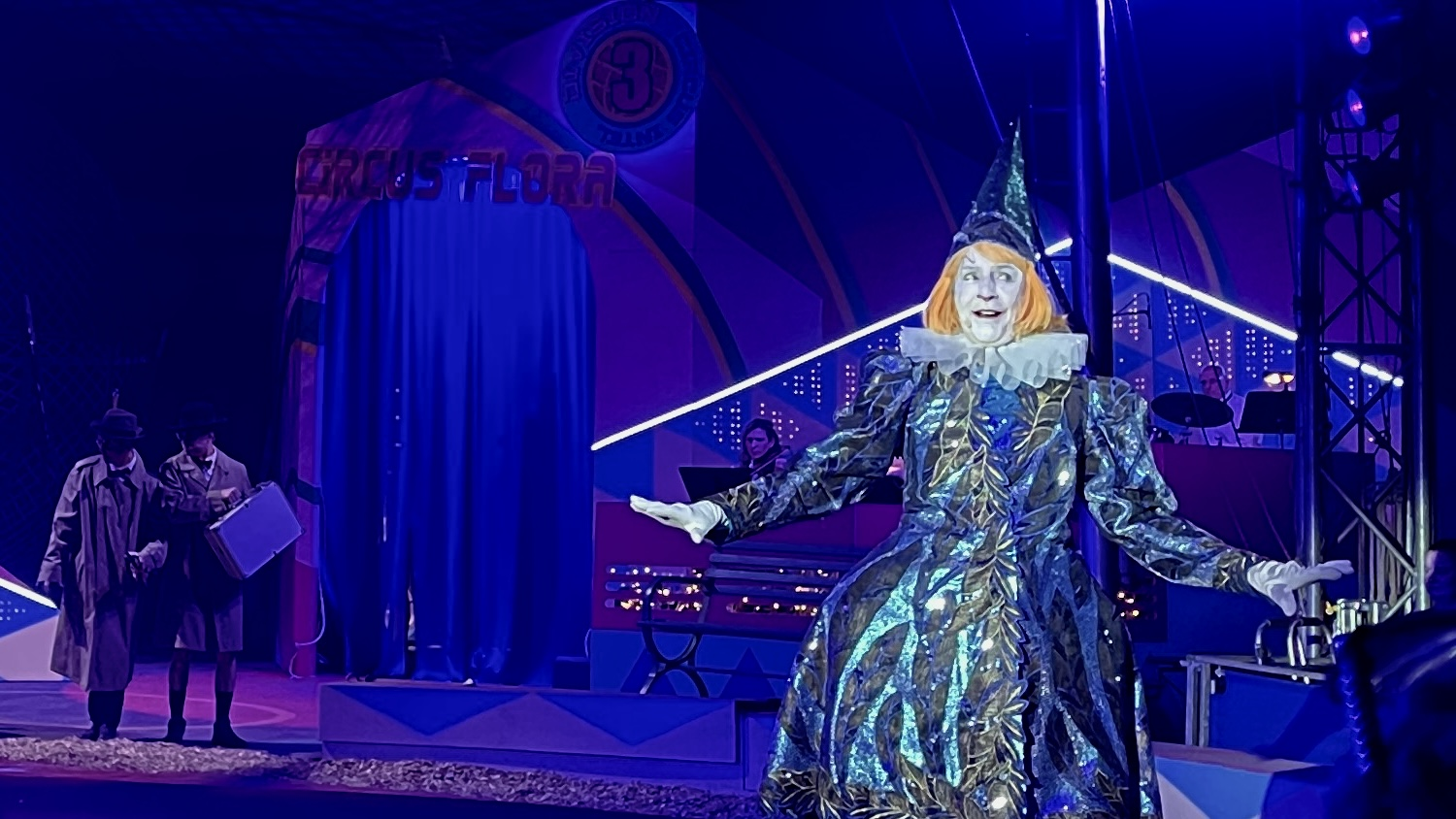
A Circus Flora performance in 2023

Circus Flora was first performed as a commissioned work for the 1986 Spoleto Festival USA, an annual celebration of the performing and visual arts in Charleston, South Carolina. Based upon its favorable reception, it was then founded as a permanent organization by Ivor David Balding, Sheila and Sam Jewell and Alexandre Sacha Pavlata. Its intended mission is to both entertain and to educate.

Circus Flora made St. Louis, Missouri its home in 1987 with assistance from Vince Schoemehl, the mayor of St. Louis at that time, and Richard Gaddes, then president of Grand Center, St. Louis's creative and cultural district. Since then, the Circus Arts Foundation of Missouri (CAFM) has been the parent non-profit organization under which Circus Flora operates.

In 2018 Circus Flora developed a permanent location in the Grand Center Arts District of St. Louis.

== Namesake ==
Flora, the Elephant, is the namesake of Circus Flora. The circus was named after Flora, the orphaned baby African elephant Balding had rescued two years earlier when ivory poachers in Africa killed her mother. For 15 years, Flora the elephant was a star of the circus. In 2000, she retired from stage life, and is now a resident of the Elephant Sanctuary in Hohenwald, Tennessee.

== Geographic extent of performances ==
Circus Flora has performed in the following cities: St. Louis, Missouri; The Kennedy Center in Washington, D.C.; The Spoleto Festival USA; Scottsdale, Arizona; Nantucket Island, Massachusetts; Cooperstown, New York; New York, New York; Charlotte, North Carolina; Houston, Texas; Norfolk, Virginia, and several other locations.

== Education ==
Circus Flora has cultivated education in the Circus Arts since its inception. One significant collaboration of Circus Flora's is its working relationship with The St. Louis Arches, an acrobatic troupe sponsored by Circus Day Foundation.
