= The Flying Wallendas =

Acrobatic performers

Logo for the group

The Flying Wallendas is a circus act and group of daredevil stunt performers who perform highwire acts without a safety net. They were first known as The Great Wallendas, but the current name was coined by the press in the 1940s and has stayed since.

== History ==
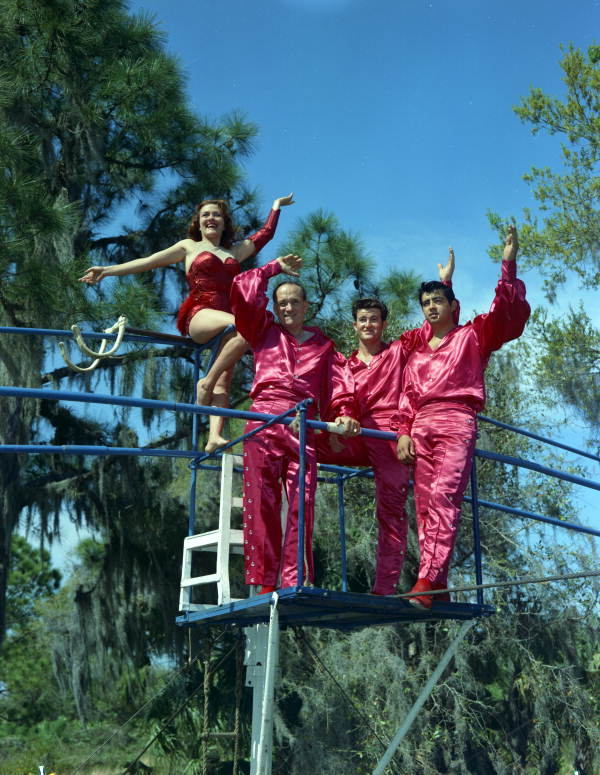
Carla Wallenda, Karl Wallenda, Raymond Chitty, and Richard Guzman (Carla's husband), c. 1965

Karl Wallenda was born in Magdeburg, Germany, in 1905 to an old circus family, and began performing at the age of six. While still in his teens he answered an ad for a "hand balancer with courage." His employer, Louis Weitzman, taught him the trade. In 1922, Karl put together his own act with his brother Herman, Joseph Geiger, and a teenage girl, Helen Kreis, who eventually became his wife.

The act toured Europe for several years, and when John Ringling saw them perform in Cuba, he quickly hired them to perform at the Ringling Brothers and Barnum & Bailey Circus. In 1928, they debuted at Madison Square Garden. The act performed without a net (it had been lost in transit) and the crowd gave them a standing ovation.

In 1944, while the Wallendas were performing in Hartford, Connecticut, a circus fire broke out, killing over 168 people. None of the Wallendas were hurt.

In the following years, Karl developed some of their most impressive acts, such as the seven-person chair pyramid. They continued performing those acts until January 30, 1962, when, while performing at the Shrine Circus at Detroit's State Fair Coliseum, the front man on the wire, Dieter Schepp, faltered, and the pyramid collapsed. Three men fell to the ground. Two died: Richard Faughnan, Wallenda's son-in-law; and nephew Dieter Schepp. Karl injured his pelvis, and his adopted son, Mario, was paralyzed from the waist down. Dieter's sister, Jana Schepp, let go of the wire to fall into the quickly-raised safety net, but bounced off and suffered a head injury.

Other tragedies include when Wallenda's sister-in-law, Yetta, fell 50 feet to her death in 1963, after fainting during her act. Wallenda's son-in-law, Richard ("Chico") Guzman, was killed in 1972 after touching a live electric wire while holding part of the metal rigging. Nonetheless, Karl decided to go on. He repeated the pyramid act in 1963 and 1977. Karl continued performing with a smaller group, and doing solo acts.

Karl crossed the Tallulah Gorge in Georgia on a high wire on July 18, 1970.

On March 22, 1978, during a promotional walk in San Juan, Puerto Rico, Karl fell from the wire and died. It was between the towers of Condado Plaza Hotel, one hundred feet high. He was 73. Nik Wallenda completed the walk on June 4, 2011, with his mother, Delilah.

On March 5, 1993, Karl's grandson, Mario B. Wallenda (not to be confused with Karl's adopted son), died from AIDS complications at the age of 36. He had tested positive for HIV in July 1990.

On October 15, 2008, Nik broke the world record for the highest and longest bike ride on a high wire live on NBC's Today.

Nik Wallenda became the first aerialist to walk directly over Niagara Falls on June 15, 2012, from the United States into Canada. Wearing a safety harness as required by ABC television, he crossed at the river's widest point.

Nik Wallenda is the first aerialist to walk over the Little Colorado River Gorge at the Grand Canyon. The event was broadcast live on the Discovery Channel. He used a 2-inch wire and made the journey without a harness or safety net. The canyon is 1,400 feet (430 m) wide and 1,500 feet (460 m) deep.

There are several branches of the Wallendas performing today, comprising most of Karl's grandchildren. They still perform regularly and have achieved recognition in Guinness World Records. On November 2, 2014, Nik successfully crossed between two Chicago skyscrapers: the west tower of Marina City and the Leo Burnett Building. After accomplishing this feat, he successfully crossed the two towers of Marina City while wearing a blindfold in cold conditions with strong winds. He set two world records, one for the highest incline—19 degrees between the west tower and the Leo Burnett building—and one for the highest blindfolded wire walk, between the two towers of Marina City. Both crossings were broadcast live on Discovery Channel.

In February 2017, a rehearsal of the troupe's eight-person pyramid high wire act for Circus Sarasota (an attempt at a new Guinness World Record for height) went awry when the pyramid collapsed, plummeting five of the performers to the ground while three others, including Nik Wallenda, managed to cling to the wire. No one was killed, but all five who fell were severely injured: Nik's sister Lijana Wallenda suffered the worst injuries, breaking nearly every bone in her face.

On June 23, 2019, Nik and Lijana became the first individuals to successfully cross New York's Times Square on a tightrope, 25 stories above street level. The duo crossed from opposite ends of the wire, which measured 1,300 feet (400 meters) long and was suspended between 1 Times Square and 2 Times Square. The stunt was broadcast live on ABC and marked Lijana's return to her first live performance since her accident. For the stunt, both Wallendas used safety harnesses, despite the family's long-standing objection to the use of safety devices. Although, unlike in Nik Wallenda's earlier Niagara Falls walk, they were not required, he admitted he felt the use of a harness was important for Lijana's first high-wire walk since her 2017 fall.

Carla Wallenda, the last surviving child of the founder of the troupe, died in Sarasota, Florida, on March 6, 2021, at the age of 85.

== Notable family members ==
- Karl Wallenda (21 January 1905 – 22 March 1978) was the founder and leader of the group until he fell to his death in 1978. He was 73.
- Nikolas (Nik) and Erendira Wallenda, Karl's great-grandson and his wife, performed with the Ringling Brothers and Barnum & Bailey Circus until its last performance in 2017. He is a seventh generation Wallenda. Erendira comes from the Flying Vasquez family of trapeze artists. They have three children; sons, Yanni and Amadaos, and daughter, Evita Wallenda, who are also learning the family trade.

== Family tree ==
Kunigunde Jameson	Engelbert Wallenda
Lucy	Herman Wallenda (1901–1985)	Martha Schepp (1911-1967)	Karl Wallenda (1905–1978)	Helen Kreis (1910–1996)	Willi Wallenda (1906-1936)
Gunther Herman Wallenda (1927–1996)	Richard Faughnan (d. 1962)	Jenny Wallenda (d. 2015)	Mario Wallenda (1940–2015)	Richard "Chico" Guzman (d. 1972)	Carla Wallenda (d. 2021)	Mike Morgan	Steven Wallenda	Elizabeth "Angel" Pintye
Olinka	Tino Wallenda	Terry Troffer	Delilah Wallenda	Tammy Wallenda	Valerie Wallenda	Rietta Wallenda	Mario B. Wallenda (1956–1993)	Rick Wallenda
Robinson Cortes	Alida Wallenda	Andrea Wallenda	Aurelia Wallenda	Alessandro "Alex" Wallenda	Claire Kuciejczyk-Kernan Wallenda-Zoppe	Lijana Wallenda	Nik Wallenda (born 1979)	Erendira Vasquez	Lyric
Ysabella Cortes	Lukas Cortes	Zaira	Michael	Yanni Wallenda	Amadaos Wallenda	Evita Wallenda

== In popular culture ==
- In 1978, The Great Wallendas, a made-for-TV movie about the family, aired.

== See also ==
- Tightrope walking
- Circus Flora
