= Tapinator =

American mobile game developer

Tapinator, Inc.
- Type: Public
- Traded as: TAPM
- Industry: Mobile Games
- Founded: 2013
- Headquarters: 1776 Broadway, Ste 2002, New York City, U.S.
- Key people: Ilya Nikolayev (CEO & Cofounder); Andrew Merkatz (President & Cofounder); Teymour Farman-Farmaian (Director)
- Website: http://tapinator.com

Tapinator, Inc., founded in 2013, is a mobile game app developer and publisher based in New York City, with product development and marketing teams located in North America, Europe, and Asia. Tapinator generates revenue through the sale of branded advertisements and App Store transactions. Since its founding, Tapinator has published more than 300 mobile games.

== History ==
Tapinator was founded in 2013 and became publicly listed in June 2014 under the ticker symbol TAPM. The Tapinator team had previously founded Familybuilder, Inc., the developer of the Family Tree application on Facebook, which was acquired by Intelius in 2011. In November 2014, Tapinator acquired InAppFuel, Inc., a developer of a patented minigame software for mobile game publishers.

On December 31, 2019, Tapinator announced a 1-for-160 reverse stock split.

== Games and Apps ==
Title	Release date	Description
Crypto Trillionaire	January 2019	Crypto Trillionaire, an idle tapper game with a cryptocurrency theme, developed by Robot Cake Games and published by Tapinator.
ColorFill	December, 2017	ColorFill, a puzzle game with elements of "Minesweeper, Sudoku, and 2048", tasks players with unveiling a hidden artwork underneath a blank canvas by following procedurally-generated numeric clues. ColorFill launched on December 6, 2018.
Dice Mage 2	August, 2017	Dice Mage 2, the sequel to the indie-success Dice Mage, was released on August 17, 2017. It features improved pixel-art visuals, and a revamped “dice-battling system” that utilizes new role-playing dice variations. Since launch, the title has been covered by several mobile gaming magazines including Heavy and App Advice. Christine Chan of AppAdvice stated, “Dice Mage 2 is a worthy upgrade… I can see myself coming back to this one for a long time."
Big Sport Fishing 2017	July, 2017	In December, 2015, Tapinator announced its acquisition of the publishing rights to Big Sport Fishing 3D, a mobile fishing game franchise. Developed by Tapinator in cooperation with Rocket Mind Inc., Big Sport Fishing 2017 allows players' smartphones to act as virtual fishing rods within a 360-degree fishing environment.
Solitaire Dash	December, 2016	Solitaire Dash, a combination of solitaire and derby horse racing, had an iOS launch on December 21, 2016, with a subsequent Google Play launch on January 9, 2017.
ROCKY	December, 2016	Tapinator announced on December 1, 2015, that it would be partnering with MGM Interactive to build a mobile game based on the Rocky film franchise. The title, which launched on December 7, 2016, for iOS, features collectible fighters (including characters from motion pictures), as well as competitive multiplayer functionality. ROCKY launched on the Google Play store on 31 March 2017. ROCKY has since been reported on by Fortune Magazine and Philly.com.
Combo Quest 2	June, 2016	Combo Quest 2 launched globally on June 24, 2016, adding new heroes, levels, and items, to the core rhythm-battling gameplay established in its predecessor.
Blackjack Classic	May, 2016	Blackjack Classic is the third entry in Tapinator's Social-Casino series, and as Video Poker Classic before it, continues the same model, but with a focus on Blackjack. It launched on May 25, 2016.
Video Poker Classic	April, 2016	Video Poker Classic was launched on April 7, 2016. Emulating the video poker machines found in traditional casino environments, the game features thirty-nine variants of video poker. By June 2016, it had reached the top 150 grossing charts in the Casino category across iPhone, iPad, and Google Play.
Miss the Moose	March, 2016	Miss the Moose, launched on March 17, 2016, is a one-touch quick-fix game where players navigate a vehicle around a circular track while attempting to avoid herds of moose. The game reached an average player review score of 4.5 out of 5, and received news coverage from Gamezebo, Social Times and App Advice.
Deadliest Catch: Seas of Fury	July 2015	Deadliest Catch: Seas of Fury, developed in cooperation with HyperPower Game Group, launched on July 13, 2015. Based on the eponymous Discovery Channel show, it received on-air exposure during the show's twelfth season.
Dice Mage	May, 2015	Launched on May 25, 2015, Dice Mage is a role-playing game where players fight monsters in an infinite world by rolling a magical dice. It was featured as a “Best New Game” on Apple's iOS App Store, and earned the rare “App Store Editors’ Note."
Video Poker VIP	April, 2015	Video Poker VIP, launched on April 30, 2015, is Tapinator's first Social-Casino property. It features multiple video poker variants, world locations, leveling, and experience-point mechanics. With the release of version 3.0 of Video Poker VIP, a competitive multiplayer mode termed, "Heads-Up," was introduced.
Burn It Down	April, 2015	Launched on April 23, 2015, Burn It Down, is a puzzle-platformer of the horror-genre with a unique control scheme that offers only two player-inputs: "left and right." It was featured by Time Magazine as one of its "5 Best iPhone Games of the Week" and was called "surprisingly plot-heavy [–] part detective story, part haunted mansion explorer."
Combo Quest	January, 2015	Combo Quest is an action-rpg with rhythm-based gameplay, launched on January 8, 2015. Thereafter, it became the #1 "Role-Playing Game" and, one of the "Top 50 Paid Games" on the iOS App Store. It established the series' unique battle system where a bar travels laterally and the player must tap the screen when the said-bar is above a block to trigger various actions.
Endless Balance	December, 2014	Endless Balance is a sequel to Balance of the Shaolin. Keeping the core "balancing" gameplay, Endless Balance discarded level-based story progression in favor of endless high score-chasing and introduced new characters and environments. Launched on December 30, 2014, Endless Balance was featured on the iOS App Store "Home Page" and became a "Top 50 Free Game."
SkyBalance by Nik Wallenda	October, 2014	SkyBalance by Nik Wallenda is the officially licensed game for Discover Channel's Skyscraper Live, launching a few days prior to the event – on October 29, 2014. Implementing elements from Tapinator's previous Balance game, Skybalance allows players to walk in the shoes of Wallenda, as he balances on a tightrope above Chicago, albeit while facing various obstacles.
Balance of the Shaolin	June 2014	In Tapinator's first "Full-Featured" title, Balance of the Shaolin, players are tasked with balancing on unorthodox objects while facing obstacles of increasing difficulty across multiple levels. Launched on June 25, 2014, Balance of the Shaolin was featured as a "Best New Game" on the iOS App Store, and became one of the "Top 50" applications on the "Overall" chart. It received positive reviews from multiple publications, including IGN Italy, which gave it an 8 out of 10.
