= Nik Wallenda =

American acrobat (born 1979)

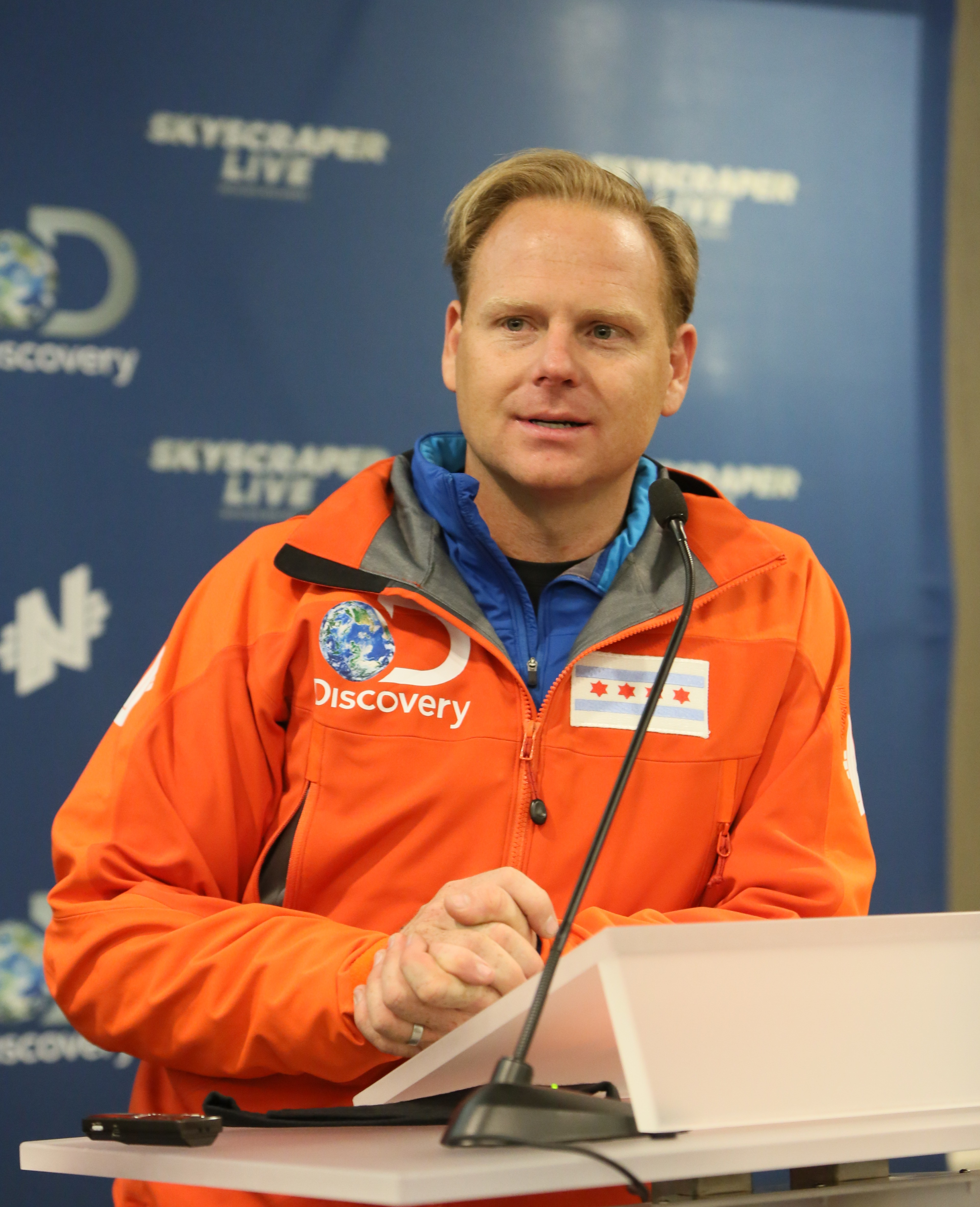
- Wallenda in 2014
- Born: Nikolas Wallenda; January 24, 1979 (age 47); Sarasota, Florida, U.S.
- Other name: The King of the Wire (nickname)
- Occupations: Acrobat, daredevil, high-wire artist
- Years active: 1992–present
- Known for: Walking over Masaya volcano in Nicaragua, an 1,800-foot walk, in 2020 in 31m 23s. High-wire act without a net First person to walk a tightrope directly over Niagara Falls
- Spouse: Erendira Vazquez (m. 1999)
- Children: 3
- Parent(s): Delilah Wallenda and Terry Troffer
- Relatives: Karl Wallenda (great-grandfather)
- Awards: Nine-time world record holder
- Website: nikwallenda.com

Nikolas Wallenda (born January 24, 1979) is an American acrobat, aerialist, daredevil, high wire artist, and author. He is known for his high-wire performances without a safety net. He holds 11 Guinness World Records for various acrobatic feats, and is best known as the first person to walk a tightrope stretched directly over Niagara Falls. Wallenda walked 1,800 feet (550 m) on a steel cable over Masaya Volcano in Nicaragua, his longest walk, on March 4, 2020.

Wallenda is a 7th-generation member of The Flying Wallendas family, and he participated in various circus acts as a child. He made his professional tightrope walking debut at the age of 13, and he chose high-wire walking as his career in 1998 after joining family members in a seven-person pyramid on the wire. In 2001, he was part of the world's first eight-person high-wire pyramid. He performed with his family at various venues from 2002 to 2005, forming his own troupe in 2005. He performed with Bello Nock in 2007 and 2008 in a double version of the Wheel of Steel that he helped invent. In 2009, he set new personal bests for highest and longest tightrope walks, completing a total of 15 walks above 100 feet (30 m) in the air that year.

In 2008, while performing with Ringling Bros., Wallenda set Guinness World Records for longest and highest bicycle ride on a high-wire 250-foot-long (76 m) at 135 feet (41 m) above the ground in New Jersey. He nearly doubled the height record in 2010 to 260 feet (79 m). On the same day in 2010, he upped his personal best by tightrope walking over 2,000 feet (610 m) in a single performance. He set a world record in 2011 by performing on the Wheel of Death atop the 23 story Tropicana Casino and Resort. Later that year, he and his mother tightrope walked between the two towers of Condado Plaza Hotel in Puerto Rico. The feat was a re-creation of the one that killed Karl Wallenda, Nik's great-grandfather and primary source of inspiration. On June 10, 2011, Wallenda hung from a helicopter 250 feet (76 m) off the ground using only his toes to hold on. Some time after that, he walked on top of a turning Ferris wheel at the Santa Cruz Beach Boardwalk in California.

Wallenda crossed Niagara Falls on June 15, 2012 on a live ABC special, following a two-year legal battle involving both sides of the Canada–United States border to gain approval. He was required to wear a safety harness for the first time in his life. A reality show aired on the Science Channel which followed his feats. In 2013, he released a memoir entitled Balance. He became the first person to high-wire walk across the Grand Canyon on June 23, 2013. The feat aired live on the Discovery Channel breaking rating records for the network. He followed that up with Skyscraper Live, a live Discovery special that aired on November 2, 2014, in which he completed two tightrope walks and set two new Guinness World Records: one for walking the steepest tightrope incline over 600 feet (180 m) up between two skyscrapers, and the other for the highest tightrope walk while blindfolded.

Wallenda is married with three children, and considers his Christian faith to be a central aspect of his life.

== Background ==
Wallenda is a seventh-generation member of The Flying Wallendas family of aerialists. His ancestors were primarily of German descent and have been circus performers since the 1700s; they have been doing balancing acts without nets since Karl Wallenda made the family famous for the feat in the 1920s. Nik Wallenda is a great-grandson of Karl, whom he calls his role model and his "biggest hero in life". Several members of the family have died while training or performing. In 1962, the troupe's famous seven-person pyramid collapsed, killing two family members and paralyzing Wallenda's uncle Mario. In 1978, his great-grandfather Karl Wallenda died after falling from a tight rope at age 73 in Puerto Rico.

== Early life ==
Wallenda was born in Sarasota, Florida on January 24, 1979 to Delilah Wallenda and Terry Troffer. His parents bought him a swing set when he was two. Before Troffer had even finished assembling it, Wallenda climbed up to the crossbar and did a somersault. Around the same time, he began performing with his family in their circus act. His first public performance was at SeaWorld San Diego in 1981. He began to play on the wire at age two, walking back and forth while holding his mother's hand. At age four, he started walking the wire on his own, learning primarily from his father. He would play on his parents' practice wire with his older sister Lijana, two feet off the ground. His parents would throw objects at him as he practiced, and even shot him with a BB gun to train him to deal with distractions. At age six, he first visited Niagara Falls and immediately decided that one day he wanted to walk a tightrope across it. He spent most of his youth on the road, living in a mobile home as his parents performed across America.

Wallenda transitioned from being a clown, to juggling, to a dog act. He made his professional tightrope walking debut at age 13. When he graduated from high school, his parents encouraged him to go to college and explore his options. With live circus losing popularity, becoming a performer did not seem like a viable career path.

Wallenda briefly considered becoming a doctor, and was accepted into college. However, his plans changed in 1998 when he participated in a re-creation of Karl Wallenda's seven-person pyramid on the high-wire in Detroit, alongside his father, mother, and other family members.

== Career ==
Nik Wallenda has produced a variety of large-scale productions for amusement parks and similar venues in several countries. The acts often feature him alongside family members, especially his wife Erendira. Wallenda's children are sometimes part of the act. His youngest child, Evita, has been performing balancing feats since she would balance in the palm of her father's hand at six months old. Wallenda's shows have incorporated water and diving feats, the Wheel of Death, incline motorcycles, aerial silk and aerial hoop, the globe of death, and tightrope walking. "We've performed nearly every circus or daredevil skill there is", claims Wallenda. "I like to mix it up", he says. "It keeps [our family] on our toes and gives the public something new to see every year." Wallenda's father, Terry Troffer, serves as his safety coordinator, having retired from acrobatics after 36 years in the business. Troffer's brother Mike serves as chief engineer. Wallenda has never had a serious accident, describing the worst injury of his life as a broken toe while playing football.

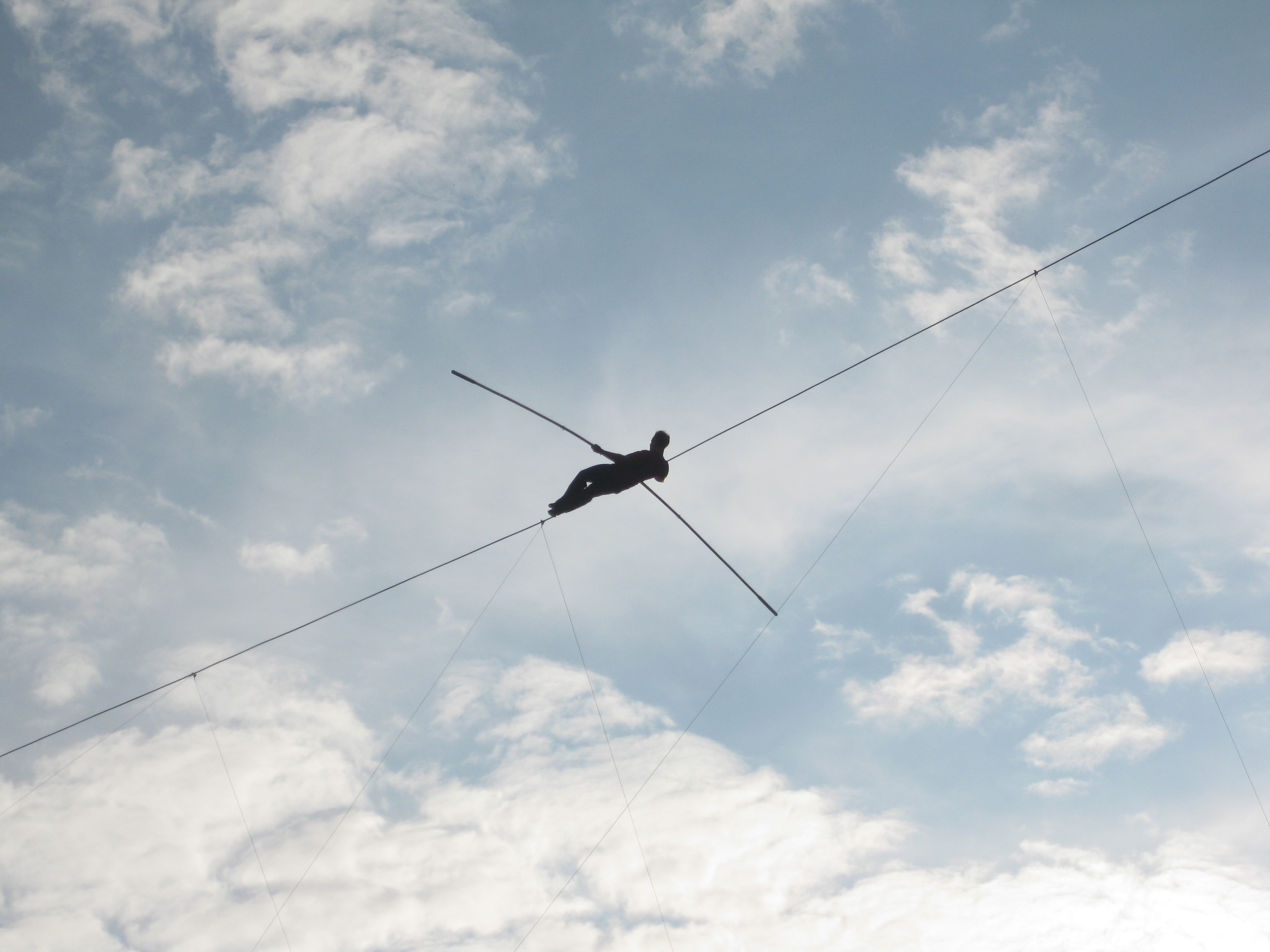
Wallenda lies down on the tightrope while performing at Canada's Wonderland theme park

Wallenda performs without a safety net or harness. "My great-grandfather taught that safety nets offer a false sense of security", he explains. He notes that a safety net is no guarantee – an uncle was killed while performing despite falling into a safety net. However, he says he does not have a "death wish in any way. I plan on living and dying a natural death when I'm old." Asked about fear, he remarked "I would say the only thing I fear is God". He adds that his Christian faith allows him to "know where I'm going to go when I die ... I'm not scared of dying."

Wallenda says that the high-wire performance is not a daredevil act or a mere stunt, but rather an athletic feat requiring great physical training. "I see a stunt as somebody who gets in a barrel and goes over the edge and hopes they don't hit a rock", he said commenting on his walk across Niagara Falls. "What I do is very calculated. I train a long time for it and I consider it more of an art. I guess I don't get offended by [people] calling it a stunt, but to me it's more of an art than anything." He aims to be "over-prepared" for every event he does, training six hours a day, six days a week. He does ten hours of weight training and five hours of aerobic exercise each week. Even so, he says wire walking is primarily a mental skill.

Wallenda has developed several tricks that he often incorporates into his high-wire routine including stopping to make a phone call, sitting on the wire, and lying down on the wire. He is said to be "obsessed" with the technological aspects of his acts, insisting on calculating every detail himself. When asked why he risks his life on the high-wire, he replied "I do this because I love what I do ... If I won the lottery tomorrow, I'd still be doing what I do." "Walking the wire to me is life", he adds. Wallenda and his family spend roughly 48 weeks per year on the road.

As of 2013 Wallenda has a contract with the Discovery Channel for near-exclusive broadcast of his acts. He carries a US$20-million insurance policy. He has called his career "extremely lucrative, more lucrative than I would have ever dreamed of". He plans to retire at age 50.

=== Early career ===
In 2001, Wallenda appeared with seven other family members at Japan's Kurashiki Tivoli Park in an attempt at the world's first ever eight-person high-wire pyramid. After five months of four hours per day, six days a week preparation, the family successfully walked across a 30-foot-high (9.1 m) tightrope in six minutes, setting a Guinness World Record. Nik Wallenda cited Karl Wallenda as the primary inspiration for the feat, and stated that "it was a landmark experience for our profession, as well as our family and me personally".

From 2002 to 2005, Wallenda performed alongside his wife, children, and other family members at Wet 'n Wild Emerald Pointe in Greensboro, North Carolina. They also toured the United States as part of various circuses. One early act featured Wallenda riding a motorcycle across the high-wire 30 feet (9.1 m) in the air. In 2005 Wallenda and his wife, Erendira, took their act to Raging Waters in San Dimas, California, while his mother and sister stayed at Wet 'n Wild. Throughout this time period, Wallenda continued to participate in the family's signature seven-person pyramid.

In 2006, McDonald's sponsored a show in Detroit. To promote the restaurant's new coffee, Nik Wallenda and his older sister Lijana did an act where they met in the middle of a high-wire and sat down to have some coffee, after starting on opposite ends. After exchanging several toasts, Nik stood up and stepped over his sister. As the siblings headed back to their platforms, a crane winch malfunctioned, preventing Lijana from exiting the wire. After Nik descended to the ground, a crane was moved to reduce the tension on the wire and he rode a hook up to rescue his sister.

=== Wheel of Steel ===
In 2007 and 2008, Wallenda was a featured performer in the Ringling Brothers production Bellobration, performing with Bello Nock on a newly contrived, double version of the Wheel of Steel. At the beginning of the act, Wallenda and Nock stood balanced atop twin circles 39 feet in the air. To the audience, the circles appeared to be connected until the act started with a burst of fireworks. The wheels then split, sending the performers in opposite directions without safety nets or harnesses. To stay on the device, the duo had to move in unison, running at up to 20 miles an hour. Vibrations were transferred from one wheel to the other, meaning each performer was affected by what the other was doing. At the top of each arc the performers were rendered weightless, while being subjected to several times the force of gravity at the bottom.

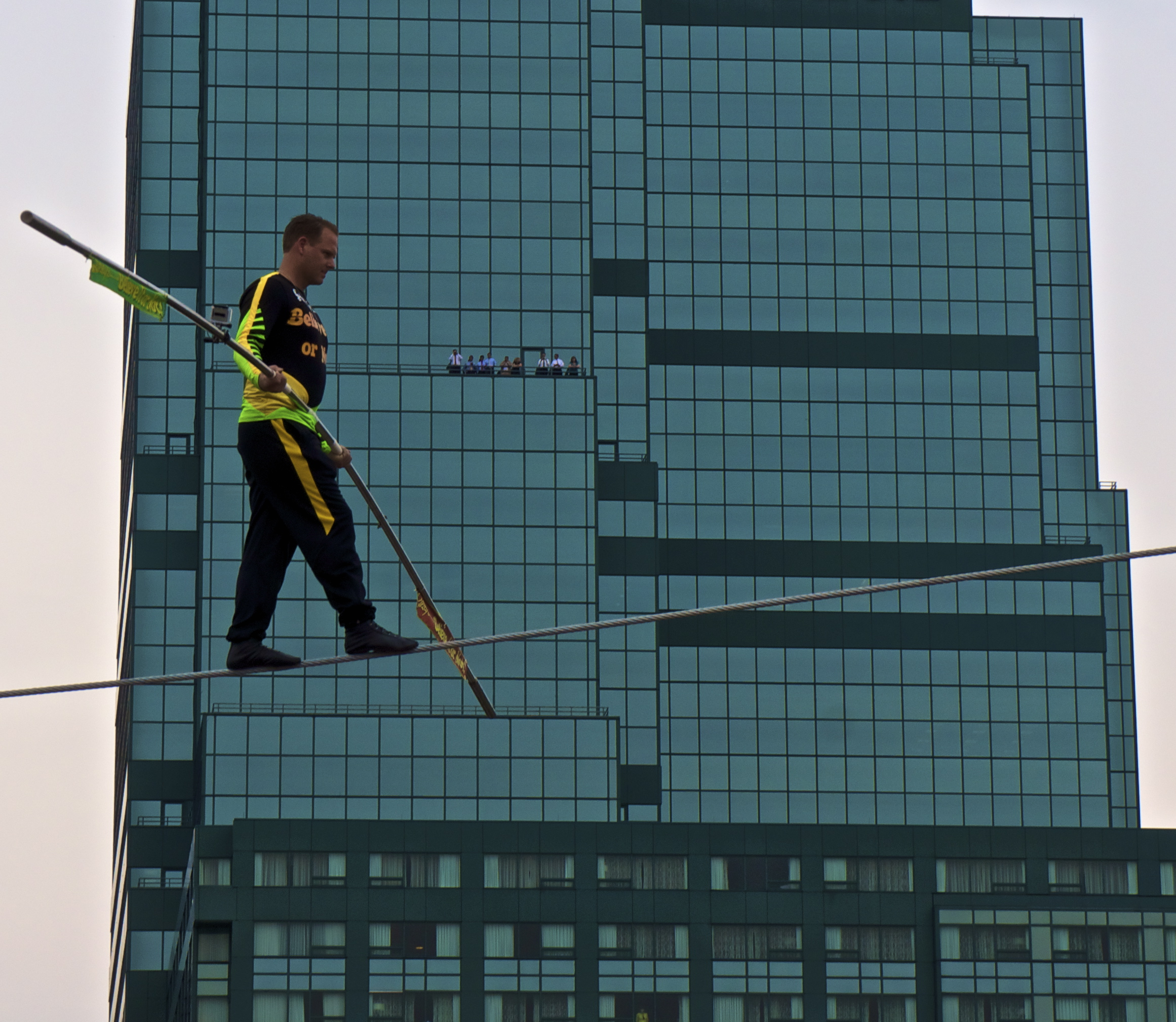
Wallenda walks a tightrope over Baltimore's Inner Harbor

The act was set around a story line. During the first half of the circus, Wallenda's wife, Erendira, played the love interest of Nock. After intermission, Wallenda and Nock "battled" it out on the Wheel, competing for her heart. To enhance the entertainment value, they mixed jumping rope, somersaults, and leaps into the routine. In all, the Wheel performance lasted seven minutes.

Also part of the same show was a sway pole performance by Nock and Wallenda's wife. Using 73-foot (22 m) poles that swayed as much as 20 feet (6.1 m) in all directions, the couple did a series of tricks that included climbing up and sliding down the poles, swinging all around, and jumping from pole to pole. In all, sixteen members of the Wallenda family were part of Bellobration.

The double Wheel of Steel was invented by Wallenda and Nock. The two had grown up together in Sarasota and had talked about teaming up for years before coming up with the double Wheel concept, drawing up the initial plans on a tablecloth during dinner in 2005. They then spent nine months building the device in Nock's backyard workshop, and a further four months testing it and designing a performance. The greatest challenge was to find a way to split the wheels while they were still spinning. "There were a lot of back-to-the-drawing-board moments", Wallenda later recalled. Ultimately, the problem was solved via a system of piston-like pneumatic cylinders. Wallenda's uncle, Timothy Stephenson, who is an engineer for the National Aeronautics and Space Administration (NASA), suggested that an axle be built of custom-blended, hardened steel alloy to keep it from breaking. In the end, the device cost more than $100,000 to produce.

=== Record-setting bicycle ride ===
On October 15, 2008, Wallenda performed on a live broadcast of Today. The plan was to walk and then bicycle off the roof of the Prudential Center in Downtown Newark, New Jersey, across a suspended high-wire 13 and 1/2 stories (135 feet) above the ground. Starting at 8:30am, he first walked across the 250-foot-long (76 m) cable with a 45-foot (14 m) balancing pole. Halfway through, he sat down on the wire and called the Today show hosts. "Where are you?" he asked, joking that he was expecting to carry one of the show's hosts across the wire on his shoulder. Sitting down on the wire is easy, he said, it is getting back up that is tricky. A few steps before completing the walk, Wallenda stopped and waved to the crowd. When he resumed, he wobbled and had to bend his knees to regain balance. "I actually slipped", he said later. "I lost focus there for a moment" because of some unexpected tape on the wire. He completed the walk in about five minutes.

Wallenda then crossed the high-wire on an ordinary bicycle with the tires and handlebars removed. Near completion, he paused, causing the bike to slide backward as it lost grip on the wire. He regained control and finished, then jumped onto the roof of Prudential Center and hugged his wife and three children. He explained in an interview: "The back wheel started to slip ... It was a little nerve-racking at the end." Five years later, he said the slip was closest he ever came to disaster. "It really shook me up", he recalled. By completing the ride, Wallenda set the world record for both highest and longest bike ride on a high-wire. A representative from Guinness World Records was on hand to present him with a certificate documenting the achievement.

=== Walk Across America Tour ===
In 2009, Wallenda took his high-wire act to ten Cedar Fair amusement parks in what was dubbed as the "Walk Across America Tour". The tour began with a 350 feet (110 m) walk at Worlds of Fun in Kansas City and ended at Carowinds, where Wallenda twice walked across the North Carolina-South Carolina state line on the high-wire. As part of the tour, he walked at Kings Island in Mason, Ohio from the front gate to the Eiffel Tower on August 15. Traveling 800 feet (240 m) at 262 feet (80 m) above the ground, it was the highest walk of his career at the time. He completed the walk in about 25 minutes as several thousand people watched.

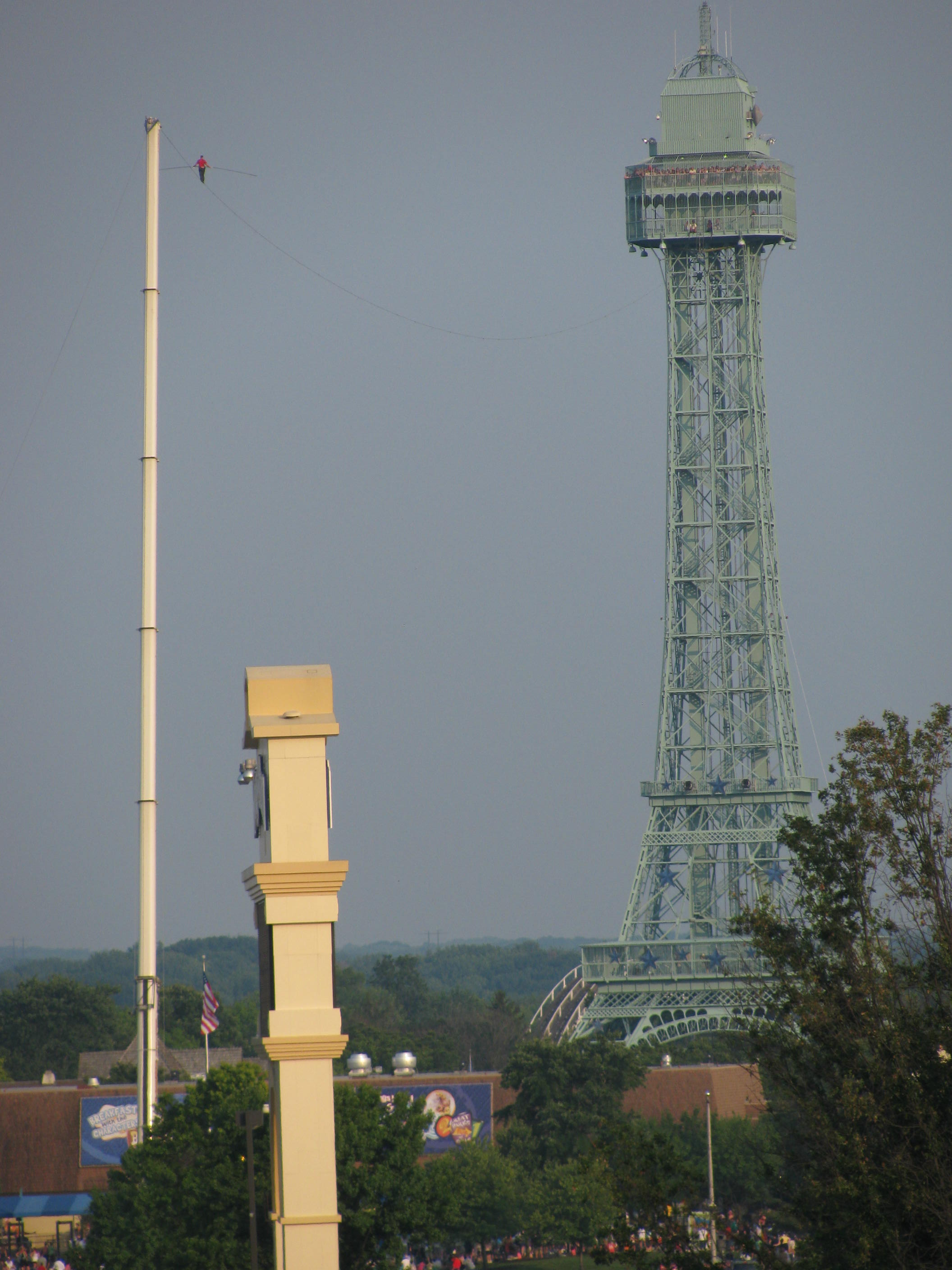
Wallenda walking the high-wire at Kings Island on August 15, 2009

On July 3, Wallenda wire walked 200 feet (61 m) over the Allegheny River in Pittsburgh as the headline act of the 2009 Three Rivers Regatta. He paused several times during the performance to kneel and wave to the crowd. At one point, he had to stop for a few minutes to regain his balance in the strong winds and rain. Although Wallenda's team had ordered an ungreased wire, it was covered in oil when it arrived. To compensate, Wallenda did the walk in his socks rather than in his tightrope shoes. At 1,084 feet (330 m), the 25-minute walk was the longest of his career to that point.

In total, Wallenda completed 15 high-wire performances at 100 or more feet in the air during 2009. In 2010, he performed in his home town of Sarasota for the first time. On February 4, he walked 600 feet (180 m) from the roof of One Watergate Condominium to the roof of The Ritz-Carlton Hotel. The performance lasted 12 minutes and was aired on national television. From February 12–28, he anchored a version of The Flying Wallenda seven-person pyramid at Circus Sarasota.

=== The Bahamas ===
On August 30, 2010, Wallenda performed at the Atlantis Paradise Island resort in the Bahamas. For the first part of his act, he rode a bicycle along a high-wire 260 feet (79 m) above the ocean. The 100-foot-long (30 m) ride set a new Guinness World Record for highest bike ride on a high-wire, nearly doubling Wallenda's own record from 2008. Following the bike ride, Wallenda tightrope walked 2,000 feet (610 m) over the resort's marine habitat filled with barracuda, piranha, and sharks. It was the longest walk of his career.

Between the morning bike ride and the late afternoon tightrope walk, Wallenda's father and safety coordinator Terry passed out from a combination of heat and stress and was rushed to the hospital. Performing without his father watching "was one of the hardest decisions I ever made in my life", Wallenda said, "but my family history and my family tradition is that the show must go on". It was the first time in his career that he performed without the assistance of his father. In addition, he had to battle rain, strong winds, and lightning in the area to complete the feats.

=== Wheel of Death record ===
On April 28, 2011, Wallenda visited the Tropicana Casino and Resort in Atlantic City, New Jersey for a pair of performances. In the first, he walked a tightrope inside the casino's shopping center. Performing with a 22-foot (6.7 m) balancing pole, 45 feet (14 m) in the air, he dropped to one knee and then onto his back during the performance. He walked both forwards and backwards before completing the 100-foot-long (30 m) journey. Afterwards, Wallenda said he had previously noted the casino's raised ceiling painted with a sky scene and said to himself "I've gotta walk there!"

Later in the day, Wallenda went outside to perform the Wheel of Death off the roof and over the side of the casino's 23rd floor. In the act, he walked inside the wheel for roughly 10 rotations, then climbed atop it where he walked and jumped rope around it. Part of the act, he performed blindfolded. The performance set a world record for the greatest height at which the Wheel had ever been performed. It was also the first time anyone had performed the act off the side of a building.

=== Puerto Rico ===
On June 4, 2011, Wallenda completed a 100-foot-long (30 m) high-wire crossing between the two towers of the ten-story Condado Plaza Hotel in San Juan, Puerto Rico. The 121-foot-high (37 m) performance was a recreation of the act that had killed his great-grandfather Karl Wallenda in 1978. For the performance, Wallenda's mother, Delilah (Karl's granddaughter), joined him. The mother and son team started at opposite ends of the wire. When Delilah reached the middle of the wire, roughly the spot Karl had fallen, she sat down on the wire and Nik stepped over her before the two continued to opposite ends of the wire. At one point during the performance, Nik knelt down on the wire and blew a kiss in honor of his great-grandfather's memory.

After the feat, Wallenda said he was "not scared at all", but admitted that the circumstances of Karl's death had haunted him for years. "This has been a dream of mine to recreate this walk", he explained. "To be able to walk in his exact footsteps is an extremely huge honor, and I did this for him as much as I did it for my family to get some closure." He also called the walk the biggest and most emotional moment of his career to that point. "I can't even put it into words. It was so emotional", he said a week later.

=== Hanging from a helicopter ===
On June 10, 2011, Wallenda performed while hanging from a helicopter 250 feet (76 m) above Silver Dollar City in Branson, Missouri. First he hung from a trapeze with two arms, then one arm, then his legs, and finally by his teeth. In so doing, Wallenda set his sixth world record. He called it his most difficult feat to date, and remarked that training "was very difficult. It was very painful. I had neck problems for months afterwards".

For the next couple months, Wallenda performed daily shows at Silver Dollar City with his family. The highlight of the show was a three-person "Chair Pyramid" on the high-wire. Wallenda and Jonah Finkelstein rode bicycles across the wire while Delilah Wallenda sat in a chair atop a balance bar they carried. In the middle of the performance, Wallenda would purposely act like he was losing control and move the balance bar erratically to heighten the drama. He would then shout "Watch it, Mom!" before regaining control. Acting off balance was the hardest part of the act, according to Wallenda.

=== Niagara Falls crossing ===
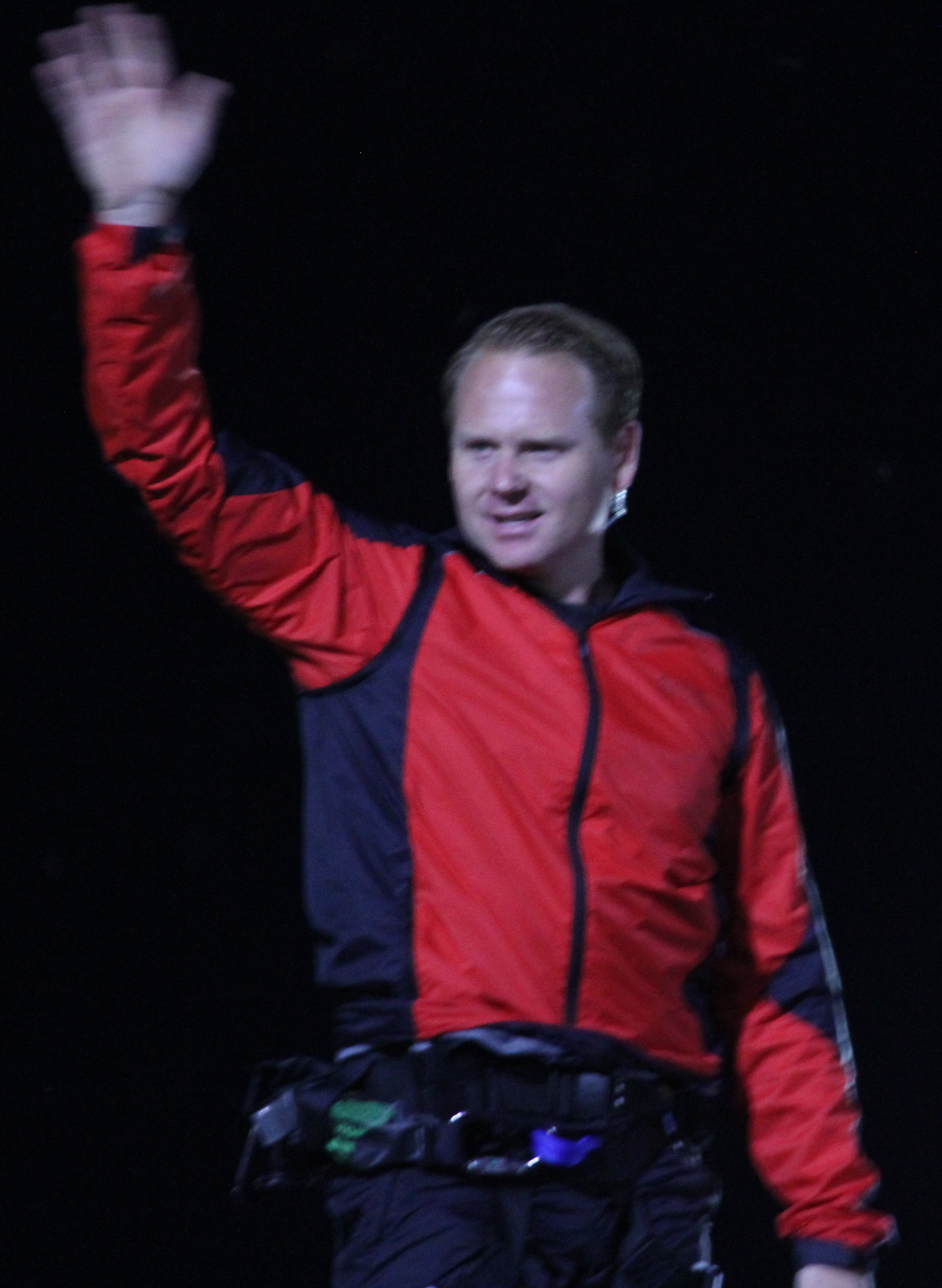
Nik Wallenda waves to the crowd at his tightrope walk across Niagara Falls in 2012

On February 15, 2012, Nik Wallenda received official approval from Ontario's Niagara Parks Commission (NPC) to walk a tightrope across Niagara Falls, a dream he had had since he was a child. The plan called for crossing the Niagara River and its 200-foot (61 m) deep gorge from the American side at Goat Island or at the smaller Luna Island, and making his way across the river to land at the Canadian side near the site of Table Rock. The American Falls and Bridal Veil Falls would be behind him and to his right, while the Canadian Falls would be on his immediate left and behind.

The approval came after nearly two years of lobbying governments in both the United States and Canada. In October 2010, Wallenda was approached by Roger Trevino, the executive vice president of Niagara Falls Redevelopment, at an amusement trade show. Trevino later recalled: "I went up to Wallenda and said 'Have you ever thought about walking across the falls?' and he said 'ever since I was a little kid', and then he asked about the steps involved." Wallenda later remarked "I believe people are brought into my life for a reason... I take everyone seriously because you just never know [who you are talking to]". Trevino next contacted New York State Senator George Maziarz. After Maziarz met Wallenda, he went to work at drafting a bill granting Wallenda a one-time exemption to the state's anti-stunting laws. Dennis H. Gabryszak co-sponsored the bill, and it passed the State Senate and Assembly nearly unanimously. The bill was signed into law by governor Andrew Cuomo on September 23, 2011.

On the Canadian side, things went less smoothly. In June 2011, public statements by NPC board members made it clear that they were opposed to Wallenda's plan. After an October meeting with Wallenda, the twelve-person board voted on December 7 to maintain their anti-stunting rules. NPC officials, led by chair Janice Thomson, feared Wallenda's plan could bring back the days when amateur daredevils routinely got themselves injured or killed at the Falls, and also believed it would cheapen the area's natural beauty. "It's sensationalism, and that's not what the falls is supposed to be about", said Thomson. In response, Wallenda funded an economic impact survey conducted by Enigma Research. The results suggested direct revenue potential of $20.5 million for the city, with up to $122 million of "legacy effects" over the next five years. The survey also predicted worldwide viewership of 460 million people. Wallenda further promised to fund all the necessary safety-contingencies and to leave no footprint on the environment. Seeing the economic benefits, Ontario Minister of Tourism Michael Chan convinced the NPC to take a second look. On February 15, 2012, the commission voted unanimously to give Wallenda's plan the go ahead, provided that he paid rigging and commission costs of Can$105,000. Wallenda described the legal battle as the biggest challenge of his career and "probably more remarkable" than the walk itself. He attributed the eventual success to divine intervention. "God's hand is involved in every step of my life", he explained. "I believe doors were opened for me that weren't opened for others". Six previous high-profile wire walkers had failed in their attempts to gain approval to walk the Falls since 1971.

In preparation for the event, municipal authorities on both sides of the border met to discuss the long-term economic impact of the event, and how to capitalize efficiently on the large number of tourists expected at the Falls when it was held. The event was expected to bring in millions of dollars in tourist revenue on both sides of the border. The Niagara Parks Commission has stated it will be at least twenty years before another major stunt is approved.

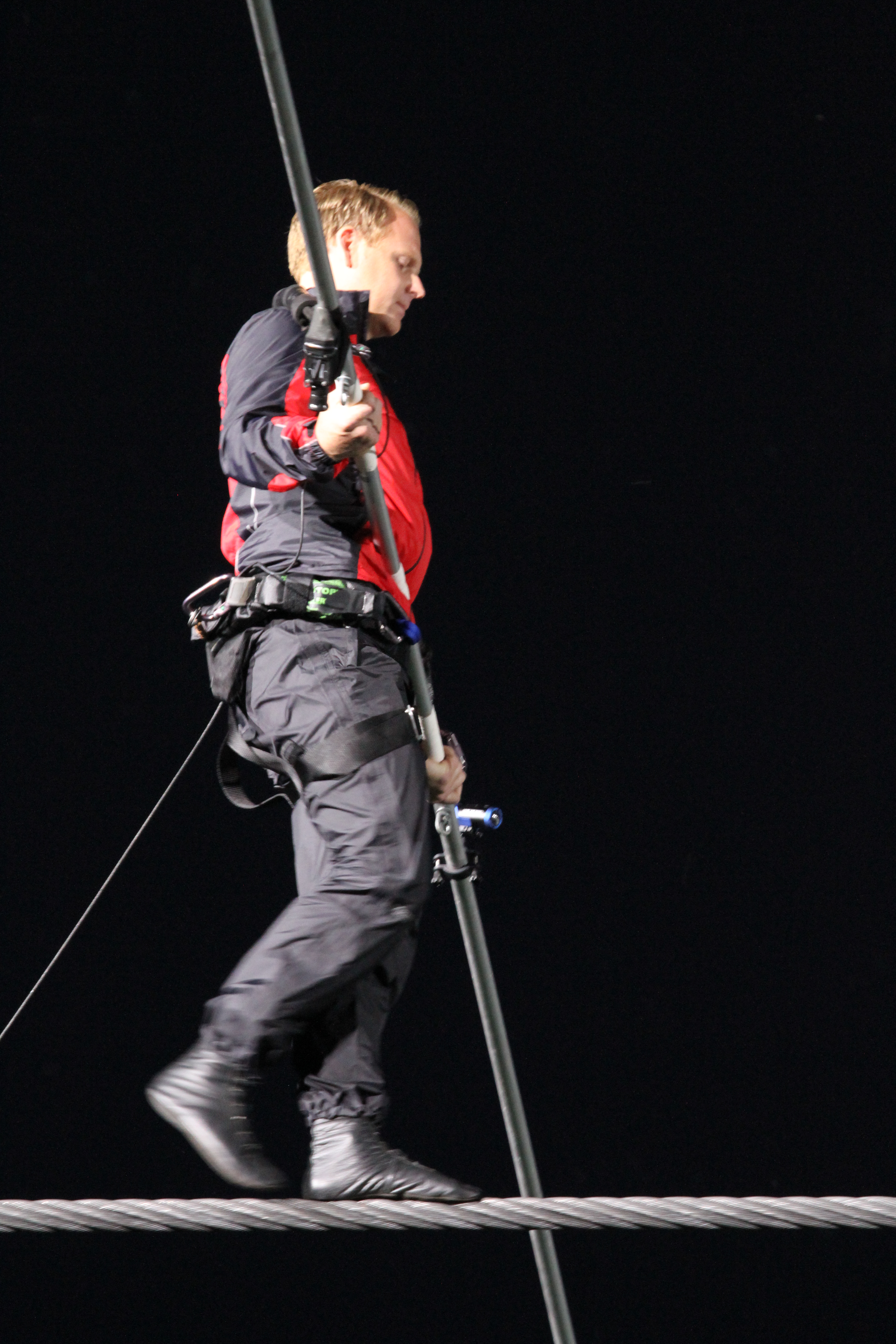
Wallenda taking his first steps on the tightrope spanning Niagara Falls.

Wallenda hopes that eventually he can make the Niagara Falls region a prominent aspect of his business. "I do plan on spending a lot of time in this community", he told local reporters months before his historic walk. "This isn't a one-off event where I'll show up and do an event and be gone. I would like to make this my second home and bring a full-time show here that I would be performing throughout the season along with all my family members as well."

The Discovery Channel had Wallenda under contract and negotiated with several of the major television networks for broadcast rights. On May 11, 2012, the American Broadcasting Company (ABC) and Lincoln Square Productions announced they had secured worldwide broadcasting rights for the event. Josh Elliott and Hannah Storm were chosen to host the coverage. In Canada, CTV's coverage of the event, although a direct feed from ABC, invoked simultaneous substitution over ABC network broadcasts in some parts of Canada.

On his final performance before heading to Niagara for training, Wallenda walked 82 feet (25 m) above Baltimore's Inner Harbor. According to Wallenda, it was the first time anyone had attached a high-wire to a barge; he remarked that the configuration made the walk "a little more unstable" than normal. Near the end of the 300-foot-long (91 m) journey, he had a significant slip, but managed to regain his balance quickly. He called the slip "a wake-up call" for Niagara. "My friend was up in the basket and I started talking to him, and it was just enough of a distraction", he explained. "The wire kind of moved a little bit and I just misstepped. It's why I've trained for so long: you stay on the wire. Your heart jumps up into your throat and two seconds later, you're fine." The May 9 event was sponsored by Ripley's Believe It or Not which was opening a museum on the harbor. When it opened in June, a feature exhibit allowed visitors to walk on a piece of the wire Wallenda had used in Baltimore.

To prepare for the Niagara event, Wallenda practiced in the parking lot of Seneca Niagara Casino for eleven straight days. He had fire trucks spray him with water and brought in a high-powered fan to try to simulate the conditions he would face over Niagara Falls. Practices were open to the public. Wallenda's safety coordinator and father, Terry Troffer, said the training was primarily mental. "This is a mental game. It's convincing himself that ... it's just a different location", Troffer explained.

Eleven days before the scheduled walk date, Wallenda faced a new challenge. Official permits had not yet been granted in New York and park officials were threatening to cancel the event over payment issues. Wallenda's managers claimed to be on schedule with the US$225,000 the state was charging him. The park commission claimed that Wallenda's failure to sign the necessary paperwork was holding things up. To avoid negative publicity, Wallenda's manager, David Simone, withdrew $75,000 from his personal account to foot the bill. Permits were issued the next day. However, two days before the event, New York parks threatened to pull the permits as Wallenda's team still owed over $10,000. According to Wallenda, "the U.S. side was just nasty to deal with toward the end. They were accusing us of lying and saying we weren't fulfilling the contract." However, he said the local officials were great to work with, blaming higher-ups in Albany for the problems. Maziarz acknowledged there were "some tense moments", but said there was never any chance of the event not happening. Ultimately, a wire transfer by ABC resolved the issue. No similar issues arose on the Canadian side.

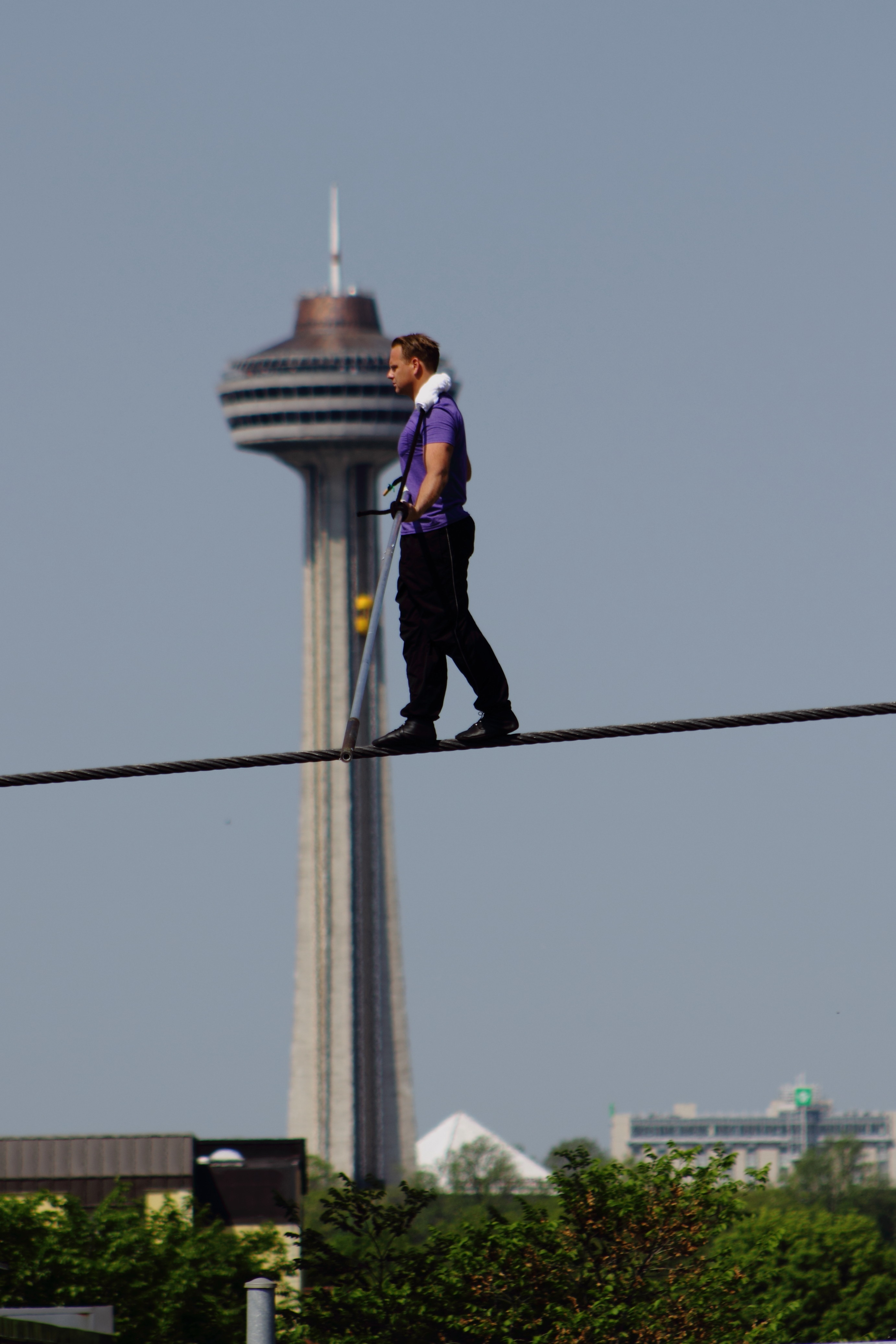
Wallenda practicing for his Niagara walk at Seneca Niagara Casino

On the day of the walk, June 15, 2012, crowds estimated in the tens of thousands gathered on the American side of the falls. On the Canadian side, the crowd was estimated at 120,000 people. Due to the location, the wire could not use supports and had to be custom made. As a result, the wire was able to sway significantly in the breeze, making the crossing more difficult than it would have otherwise been. It was the first time in Wallenda's career that he performed without guy wire stabilizers. The wire was two inches (five centimeters) in diameter, significantly wider than the 5/8 of an inch wire Wallenda typically uses, and weighed roughly 8.5 tons (7,700 kg). The extra width was necessary to make the cable strong enough to withstand the tension required. Getting it across the Falls was a major technological challenge. On June 12, a helicopter flew a yellow rope across the canyon. The rope was attached to the steel high-wire and a giant winch was used to slowly pull the wire across as the crew slowly increased tension to support the increasing weight. Weighted pendulums were attached every 150 feet (46 m) to keep the wire from twisting.

To make the walk accessible to viewers worldwide, it was held after dark, with the first step coming at 10:16 p.m. local time (02:16 June 16 UTC). The time was also advantageous to Wallenda, as half of the volume of water going over the Falls is diverted for power generation purposes after dusk. Wallenda wore a microphone for the event which allowed Troffer to talk with him, while the public listened in, throughout the walk.

Wallenda's chosen path took him 1,800 feet (550 m) across the widest part of the falls. He slowly inched his way across the slippery wire, praying and praising Jesus Christ as he went. As he took his first steps over the water, walking on a downward slope, he told reporters, "It's a beautiful view ... A dream in the making." Later he described the first step over the falls as the toughest part of his journey. "Mentally, your mind goes, 'What are you doing?'" he recalled. When he reached the midpoint, he was roughly 35 feet (11 m) lower than where he started due to the sag of the wire. The second half of the walk brought him uphill, back to the same elevation at which he began.

Wallenda did not falter or totter in the slightest during his walk, nor did he stop to do any extra tricks during the walk (as he often does). Talking to ABC reporters live, as he entered the final phase of the trip he admitted, "I'm drained ... My hands are going numb. I feel like I'm getting weak." Later he said, "my forearm just started to cramp worse than it ever has been before", attributing it to the stress of the day. Near the end, he stopped, got down on one knee, and blew a kiss to the crowd. He got up, pumped his fist, and ran the final few steps. He completed the crossing at 10:41 p.m. EDT, 25 minutes after he started. In so doing, Wallenda became the first person to cross directly over Niagara Falls on a high-wire. In the 1800s, a few tightrope walkers had crossed over the Niagara Gorge down river, but none had ever crossed directly over the Falls. He also set the world record for longest walk over a waterfall. Prior to Wallenda, the last person to cross the river on tightrope was James Hardy in 1896. According to Wallenda, it was the longest unsupported tightrope walk in history. He carried his passport on the trip and was required to present it to Canadian border guards waiting for him upon his arrival on the Canadian side of the falls.

ABC required Wallenda to wear a safety harness for the walk. After the decision was made in mid-May, a spokesperson for ABC explained: "We had always made clear from the beginning that significant safety precautions would need to be taken. This is the outcome of that." Wallenda was not happy about the decision, stating "It's disheartening—I wanted to do it without anything." The Niagara Parks Commission indicated it was unaware of such a requirement when they were considering approval. During the walk, Wallenda told his dad that he felt "like a jackass" wearing the harness. Many observers predicted he would remove the harness partway through the walk, but ultimately he did not do so. Before the crossing, Wallenda had promised that he only would remove the harness if it became a hazard during the walk. "When I first found out about it, there was no doubt in my mind I was going to take it off", he later said. "But as [the event] got closer and closer, I realized I had to honor my word. I've always said I'm a man of integrity." He also acknowledged that removing the harness would have created contractual problems with ABC. "The way a TV network works, if something goes wrong, they fire people", he said. "If I would have dropped that tether, four people would have been fired because I'm too selfish to care or because it's all about me." In addition to the harness, Wallenda wore a waterproof track suit and shoes custom made by his mother for the walk. Part moccasin, part ballet shoe, the shoes were designed to get a good grip when wet.

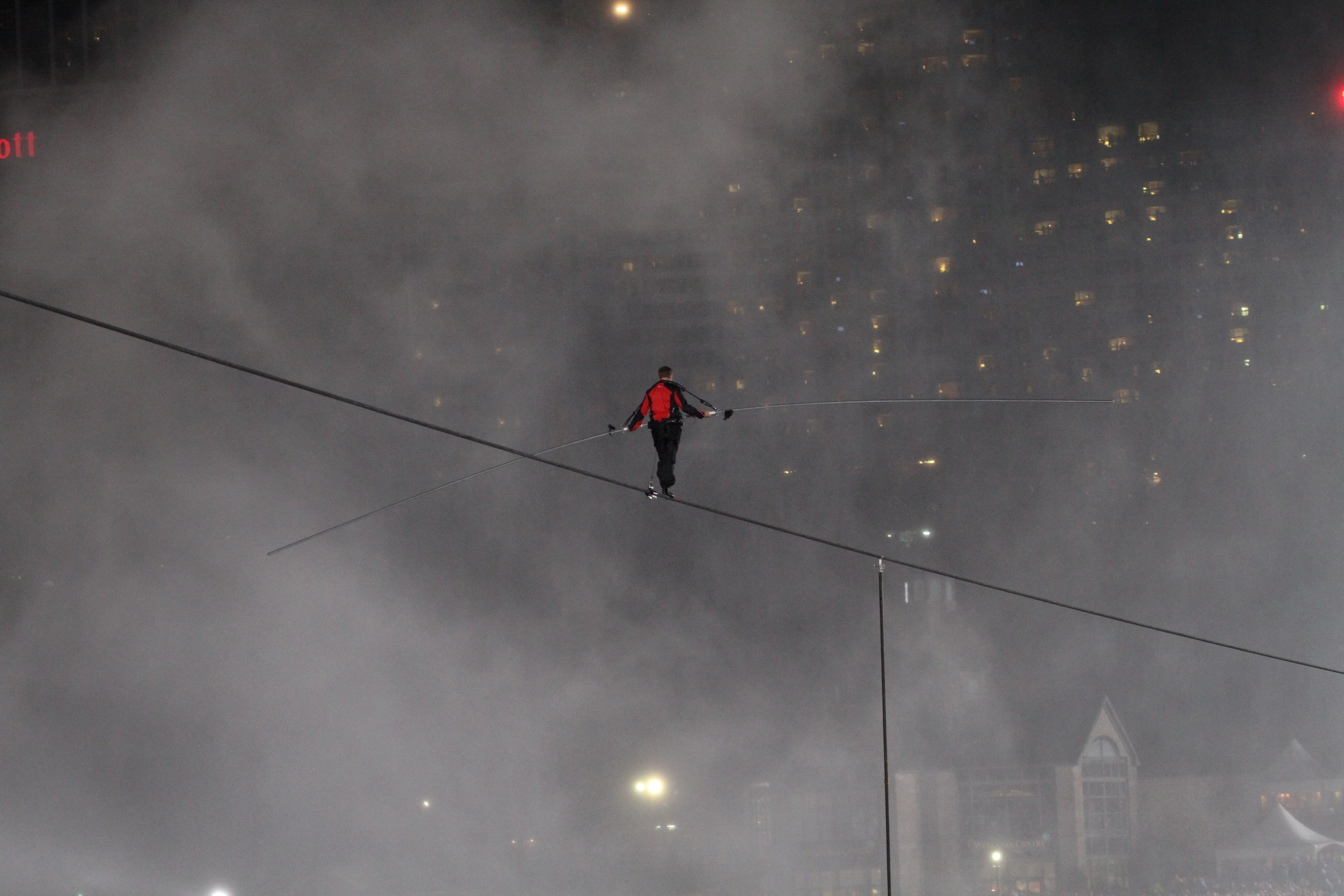
Wallenda surrounded by the mist of Niagara Falls, midway through his crossing

Project costs were between US$1.2 and $1.3 million, necessitating ABC's financial support (and with it, their demand of a safety harness). "I'd dare say that never in the history of the circus industry has there been one event that costs this much", said Wallenda. The production was a serious financial strain on Wallenda. "It's been a tough situation all around", he said a week before the event, blaming the lingering fight over the safety harness for inhibiting sponsorship deals. When production costs ran over the original estimate of $1 million, he appealed to the public for help using the fundraising website Indiegogo. He eventually met his goal of $50,000. Additionally, Niagara Falls, Ontario, mayor Jim Diodati asked local businesses to chip in, saying he hoped to raise $250,000. Ultimately, he helped generate about $200,000 of support from local business associations. The main causes of the overrun were the need to produce two custom cables – one for the performance and a shorter one for practice – and the need to hire a new helicopter company to set up the cable at the last minute, after the original one discovered they did not hold the necessary licenses. After the event, Wallenda said he had probably lost money on the event; however, he added, it was "clearly worth it" in the long term. With all but one bill accounted for, Wallenda said he lost less than $50,000 on the event. The fundraising, combined with several contractors lowering their bills, helped him get close to budget. "I think people still have the impression that Nik Wallenda is going to walk away from this thing making millions of dollars, but that's not the case", he commented.

After completing the walk, Wallenda said it was more difficult than he had expected. "That mist was thick. It was hard to see at times. The wind was wild. It'd come at me one way and hit me from the front, and hit me from the back." Weather instruments showed gusts up to 14 mph during the walk. Wallenda further remarked that the turbulent waters below made it difficult for him to see the wire. Before the walk, Jay Cochrane, a veteran wire walker who had unsuccessfully petitioned to walk Horseshoe Falls for 30 years, said of the local weather "Unpredictable is a mild word. It is unforgiving ... [Horseshoe Falls] can spray mist anywhere from 380 to 590 feet in the air. I've seen it, I've measured it." He added that walking Horseshoe Falls was an opportunity "like none other in history." Long-time circus performer Jackie LeClaire remarked, "aerialists always try to calculate risk. Nik couldn't do that because this walk had never been done before." Local historian Paul Gromosiak, who has researched daredevil activity in the Niagara region for his books, said Wallenda's proximity to the falls made his act far more dangerous than any prior act.

After talking briefly with reporters, Wallenda called his grandmother, who reportedly had been too frightened to watch the walk, in order to let her know he made it safely. In a news conference shortly thereafter, Wallenda remarked "I feel like I'm on cloud nine right now ... The impossible is not quite the impossible if you set your mind to it." He credited a combination of prayer, concentration, and preparation for his success.

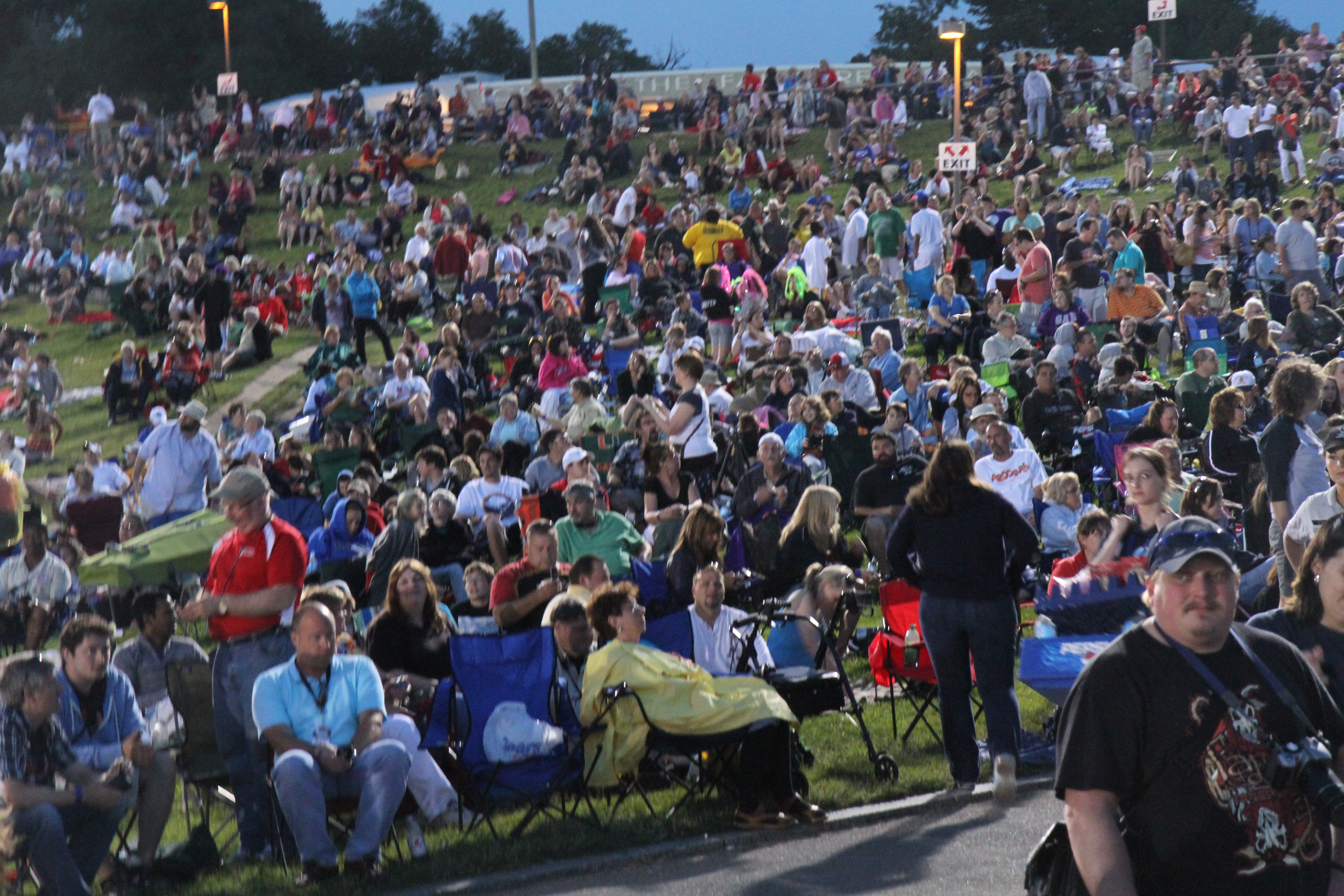
The crowds present at Wallenda's tightrope crossing.

On June 16, Engima Research estimated that one billion people had seen or heard about Wallenda's walk, up from an estimate of 410 million prior to the event. Niagara Falls, Ontario, mayor Jim Diodati declared that "the stars aligned perfectly" allowing the event hit its "full potential". Media representatives from Australia, China, France, Germany, Great Britain, Korea, and the Middle East were on hand to cover the event. Overnight Nielsen Ratings indicated that the two-hour special was the most watched television broadcast in the United States for the night. Initial estimates put the show at a peak rating of 7.7, representing almost 13 million viewers during the last half-hour of the program. When final numbers were released, the viewership number was upped to 13.3 million for the final half-hour, and an average of 10.3 million for the entire two-hour special. Viewership peaked at around 16 million.

It was ABC's highest rated Friday night program since November 2007, and the highest non-sports summertime program on any of the major networks in six years. The program, together with the NBA finals, helped ABC beat their nearest competitor by 36% in total viewers and 88% in the important 18–49 demographic for the week. In Buffalo, New York the show peaked at a 48.5 rating/67 share for the last half-hour, meaning two out of every three TV viewers at the time in that area were watching the event. The rating possibly represented the highest summertime viewership for any program in history there. In Canada, the program averaged 3.9 million viewers, with viewership peaking as the walk ended with 6.8 million watching. The program set a new summertime record for most watched non-sports special. Viewership was highest in Toronto where the production brought in a 20.8 rating/50.4 share, meaning more than half of the city's television were tuned in.

The morning after walking Niagara Falls, Wallenda drove his family to the airport so they could rejoin the Fabulous Wallendas Famous Family Circus in Branson, Missouri. Later on June 16, Niagara Falls, New York, mayor Paul A. Dyster presented Wallenda with the key to the city. He also said that the city may erect a permanent memorial on Goat Island to document Wallenda's feat. Dyster had initially been skeptical of the event, but was won over by Wallenda's personality. "The way he's been conducting himself since he's been in Niagara Falls has won him a lot of friends", Dyster explained. On the Canadian side, Diodati said he would like to erect a statue of Wallenda at Table Rock with a green screen photo booth to allow visitors to "participate" in the historic walk. On June 27, Janice Thomson said plans were in the works to install plaques near Table Rock and on White Water Walk. Previously, she described the event as a complete success, remarking that it had showcased the river's natural beauty to an international audience.

On July 20 it was revealed that Niagara Falls, New York, was attempting to bill Wallenda an additional $25,000 for police and fireman overtime. City officials cited the state law passed to allow the walk, which read "Mr. Wallenda shall pay ... reasonable costs associated with security or law enforcement stemming from this activity". Dyster said to forgive the alleged debt would amount to "a gift of public funds". Wallenda called the request "disgusting and sad", saying "This was a great thing for the area ... [They] gave me a key to the city, and now they want to ask for more money?" He noted that the city staged a downtown festival to take advantage of the crowds, and said he should not have to pay the security costs related to the festival. His lawyer, John P. Bartolomei, said Wallenda was only responsible for money spent by the city in the park itself, which had already been more than paid. He also noted that Wallenda's contract was with the state parks commission, not the city itself. Senator Maziarz called the city's position "shortsighted" and accused Dyster of being "disingenuous". He noted that Dyster had been against the walk from the beginning and that the city had never tried to bill other entertainers for costs associated with their acts. On July 24, the city council passed a resolution encouraging Dyster to stop pursuing the alleged debt by a 4–1 margin. Dyster responded by stating he was legally obligated to continue his efforts, remarking "Since the council didn't establish the fee I'm not sure if the council can forgive it". He did, however, say he would ask the state comptroller for second opinion.

On the Canadian side, Diodati and the NPC said Wallenda had fulfilled all financial obligations. Diodati added that he was not billing Wallenda for $10,000 of unbudgeted costs incurred by the city. "We're treating this event as an investment, not as an expense. We're quite happy with the way this turned out", he said. Wallenda says that the experience has made him less likely to stage a permanent attraction on the American side of the falls.

According to The Buffalo News Wallenda was seen picking up cigarette butts and other trash long after most of the media had left. He grabbed a shovel and helped fill in the hole left by apparatus. "It's just something that has to be done", he said. "I'm not scared of working." "We take great pride in being a zero-impact operation", he said prior to the event. A parks official said the area was clean and back to normal by 3 p.m. the day after the walk. Wallenda reiterated that he hopes to develop a lasting presence in Niagara Falls. "There will always be a piece of my heart in Niagara Falls", he remarked. "I do see a future here and hope to have a show in this area and hope to spend more time here." He did, however, rule out a repeat performance saying, "No. That's not really my thing. I've done it. It's done."

Research released by Niagara University's Hospitality Training and Research Center on July 1, suggested that Wallenda's walk had brought in $3.3 million of revenue for the city of Niagara Falls, New York. The research indicated that 38,000 people gathered on the American side of the falls to watch the act, 41% of which were from out of town. Among the out-of-town visitors, 52% came specifically to see Wallenda. Niagara Tourism and Convention Corporation reported that hotel bookings and related business was up 30% in the two weeks after the walk. Website traffic and sales of multiple attraction passes experienced similar increases. Hotel occupancy in Niagara Falls, New York rose to 81.6% in June 2012, from 76.5% in June 2011.

On the Canadian side, no official effort was made to calculate the economic impact, although Enigma Research said the event "might have done better" than the $21.5 million the company estimated before the event. Wallenda's feat has also been credited with creating a "surge of interest in circus and circus arts across the world".

=== Nik Wallenda: Beyond Niagara ===
A reality show, originally titled Danger By Design, following Wallenda and his family premiered on The Science Channel on June 18, 2012. The show's pilot had previously aired in 2010 under the title Life on a Wire, before Discovery decided to hold the show until after the Niagara Falls walk. The pilot episode, which tracked Wallenda's high-wire walk and bicycle ride in The Bahamas, was described as "a sometimes painfully candid look at the creative tensions — and the strong familial bond — between Wallenda and his dad, Terry Troffer, who got so stressed out during preparations for that stunt he wound up in the hospital" by the Sarasota Herald-Tribune. Later episodes showcased Wallenda hanging from a helicopter by his teeth, preparing for the Wheel of Death in Atlantic City, blowing himself up in a box, and retracing the steps of Karl Wallenda's fatal last act in Puerto Rico. The show focused on the science and engineering that go into Wallenda's acts.

After two episodes had aired, the show was renamed Nik Wallenda: Beyond Niagara. The next week, on July 2, it was put "on hold" by The Science Channel. Wallenda said the decision was "not that surprising" given the limited marketing efforts and multiple name changes. The Science Channel declined to comment on the decision.

=== After Niagara ===
On June 20, 2012, Wallenda rejoined his family in Branson. He was greeted by a parade in his honor at the Silver Dollar theme park. For Wallenda, it was back to business as usual. "I never want to get complacent", he said in a press release. "I could get hurt just as easily on a wire here as walking over Niagara Falls."

On August 9 Wallenda conducted a 1,300-foot (400 m) tightrope walk across the Atlantic City beach from Sovereign Avenue to the Tropicana Resort, roughly 100 feet (30 m) in the air. According to him, the walk was a unique challenge due to potentially dangerous ocean winds. Additionally Wallenda was surprised by the large amount of sand that stuck to the wire and considered cancelling as a result. "I learned a lesson", he remarked. "There was a lot of sand on the cable and it actually made it a little bit slippery, definitely eerie at the beginning". Ultimately, he completed the half-hour walk without any visible difficulty. Large crowds were reported for the public event, with attendance estimates ranging from 100,000 to 150,000. Wallenda believes that the feat marked the first time that a wire walker attempted such a walk on any beach.

The beach walk was done to promote Wallenda's new show, "Beyond the Falls: Nik Wallenda and the Wallenda Family Experience", which premiered at the Tropicana Resort on August 12. The show featured Nik, wife Erendira, mother Delilah, cousin Blake, and about a dozen other performers in a variety of circus acts including contortion, quick-change artistry, and juggling. Michael Richter served as the lead clown and the show ended with the Wallendas doing a bicycle pyramid on the wire. The show was production designed by his designer Brian Sidney Bembridge. Amy Rosenberg of The Philadelphia Inquirer described the show as "an old fashion vaudeville variety act" and remarked "I dug the show and so did all the little kids around me".

=== Balance ===
On June 4, 2013, Wallenda's memoir, Balance: A Story of Faith, Family, and Life on the Line, was published by FaithWorks. Ghost written by David Ritz, the book details his family history, Christian faith, and his circus career. Ritz got in touch with Wallenda after his Niagara walk to pitch the idea. He then spent several months following Wallenda around and asking questions. Erendira, who has an excellent memory, supplied much of the dialogue.

Balance weaves in themes of faith throughout, as it chronicles Wallenda's childhood, adolescence, and adult career, with particular emphasis on the ups and down of his marriage and personal life. It concludes with the Niagara Falls crossing. "One of the challenges of writing a book", Wallenda commented, "is there's things you probably don't want people to know about you ... It was very emotional telling these stories at times ... It is a challenge to reveal your life story."

Reviewer John Law remarked, "Wallenda is really juggling two books with Balance – one about his tireless belief in God's plan, and the stuff readers actually want to know: The hardships, the drama, the thrill of life on a wire." He said the book felt "rushed", likely in an attempt to get it out before Wallenda's crossing of the Grand Canyon, but said it is "worth it for the chapter on the Falls".

=== Canyon walk ===
On June 23, 2013, Wallenda highwire walked across the Little Colorado River Gorge in Navajo territory outside Grand Canyon National Park's borders about 40 miles east of the main tourist facilities. The event, billed as a "Grand Canyon crossing" and titled Skywire Live with Nik Wallenda, aired live worldwide on the Discovery Channel with a 10-second delay. Opinions varied on whether the event was truly a walk across the Grand Canyon. The Reuters news agency described the location as simply "the Grand Canyon", while the Associated Press described it as a "gorge near the Grand Canyon." According to the United States Geological Survey, the Grand Canyon geological area includes the Little Colorado River Gorge.

Wallenda originally obtained permits to walk across the canyon in 2008, and planned to make the trip as early as 2009. However, the walk was delayed due to substantial logistical hurdles. When the opportunity to cross Niagara Falls arose, the Grand Canyon walk was put on hold. Shortly after crossing Niagara Falls, Wallenda said he would try to make the Grand Canyon crossing "within a year". In August 2012, he said that he was "98 percent" certain that the walk would take place in May or June 2013 and said he would get "something in writing" that no safety harness would be required for the walk. On March 18, 2013, Wallenda announced that he had come to terms with The Discovery Channel for television rights.

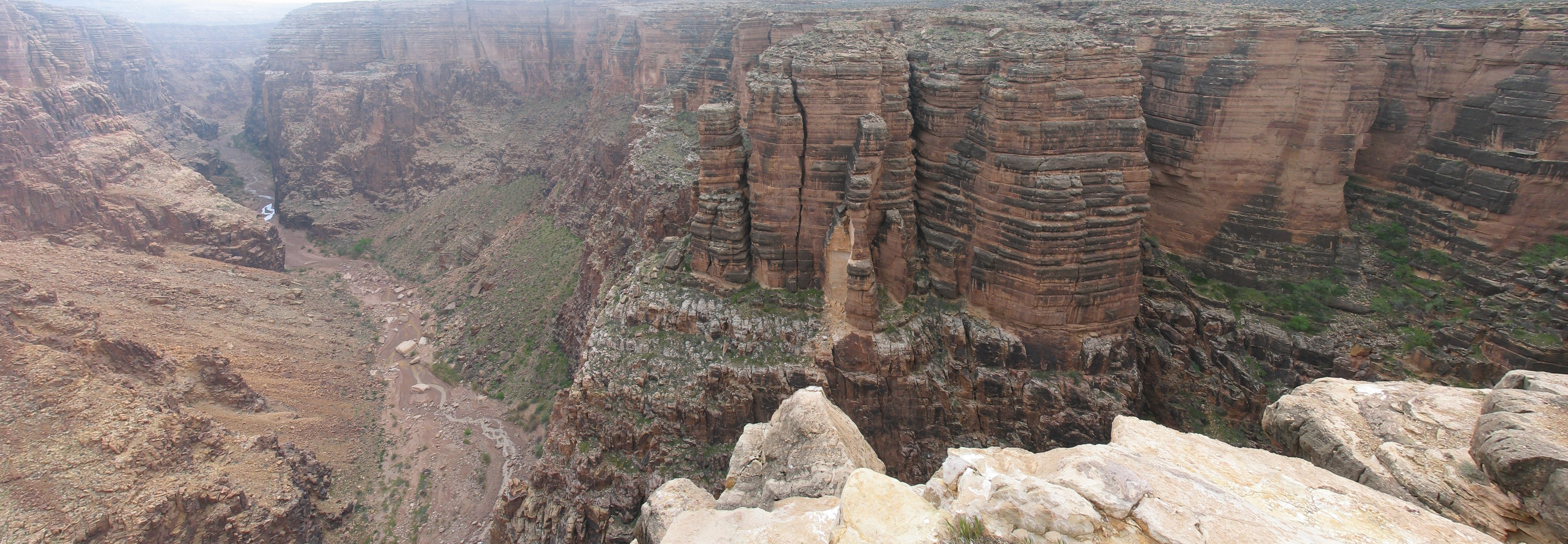
Little Colorado River gorge near Grand Canyon National Park.

To prepare for the winds, Wallenda walked a 1,000-foot (300 m) wire twice daily along the banks of a Sarasota river with fans watching. He used wind machines to simulate wind gusts up to 91 miles per hour (146 km/h) and practiced during the heavy rain of Tropical Storm Andrea. Wallenda said it was "hard to prepare for [the updrafts] ... when it comes down to Mother Nature, we're not in control."

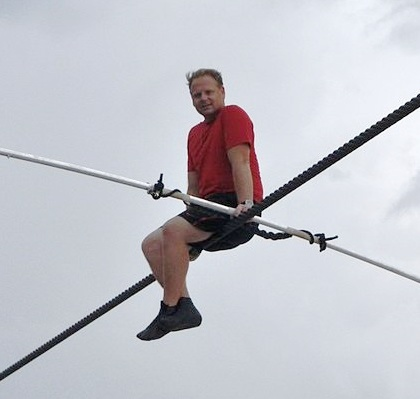
Wallenda Training for Canyon Walk

At 1,500 feet (460 m), the walk was the highest of Wallenda's career, about seven times as high as the Niagara crossing. He covered a distance of approximately 1,400 feet (430 m) in 22 minutes, 54 seconds, using a 2-inch-thick (5.1 cm) wire. He carried a 30-foot-long (9.1 m) balancing pole weighing 43 pounds (20 kg).

As the walk began, Wallenda realized the wire had become slippery due to gathered dust. He spat on his hands and rubbed his shoes for better grip. Shortly thereafter, he stopped and crouched down on the wire due to wind gusts. He later stopped a second time to break the bounce of the wire that his walking had induced. Throughout the walk, Wallenda could be heard praying, repeatedly saying "Thank you, Jesus." Wallenda ran the last few steps then jumped off and kissed the ground. Completing the walk in 22 minutes, 54 seconds, Wallenda became the first person to highwire walk across a Grand Canyon area gorge.

After the walk, Wallenda said it was more difficult than he had expected and that "it took every bit of me to stay focused". He said that dust had accumulated in his contacts and called the walk unusually stressful. However, he called the view breathtaking, and said the opportunity "was a dream come true." Skywire Live drew an average of 10.7 million viewers in the United States, making it the highest rated program of the night. During the walk itself, viewership increased to 13 million. It became the highest rated live program in Discovery's history and won 71% of TV-related social media usage for the day.

=== Skyscraper Live ===
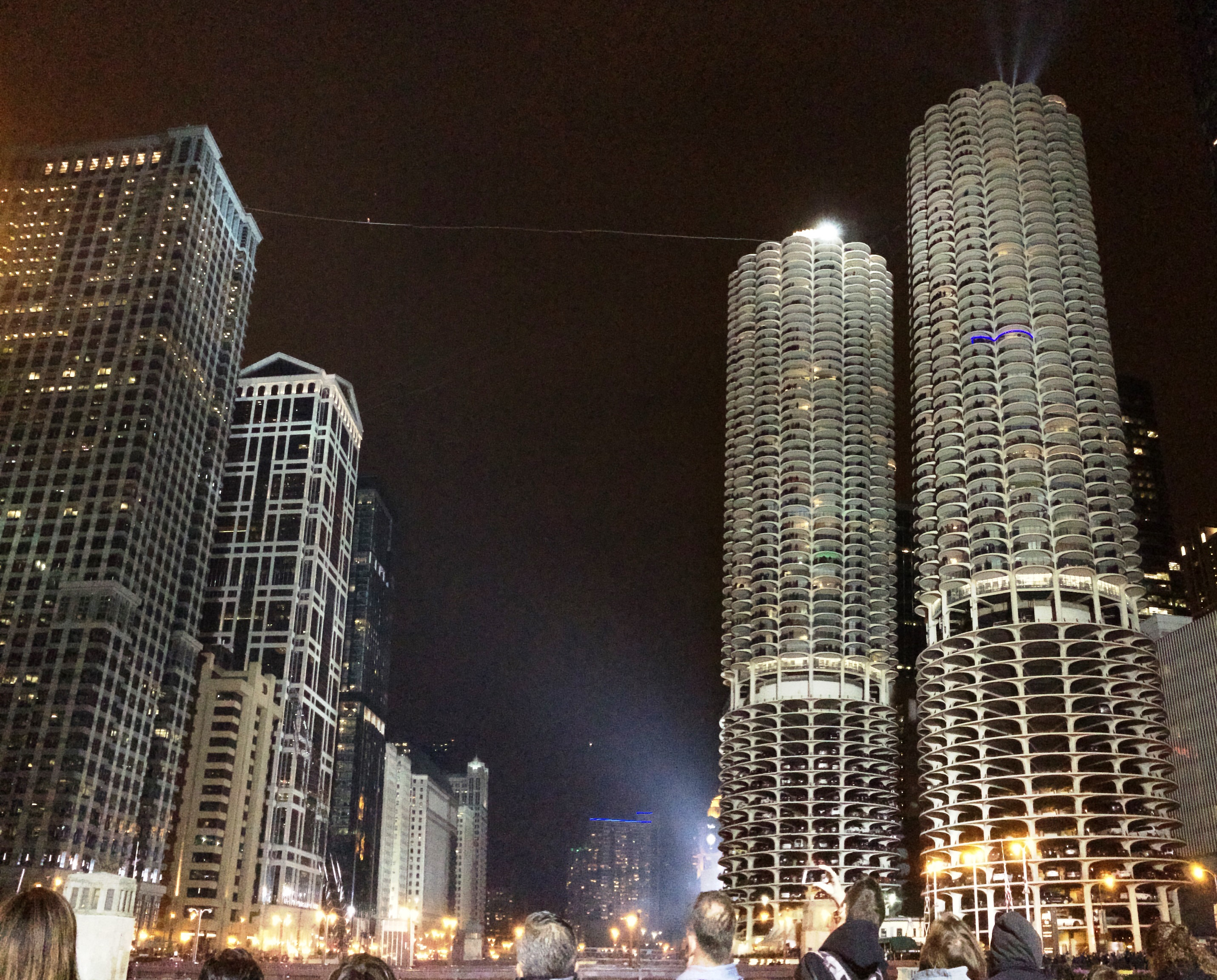
Spectators watch as Wallenda walks the rope from Marina City (right) to the Leo Burnett Building (left) in Chicago.

During a live interview on Skywire Live, Wallenda said for his next feat he would like to walk between the Chrysler Building and the Empire State Building in New York City. The following day the New York City Police Commissioner Ray Kelly said the city would not grant permission for a stunt like that.

Wallenda was unable to get permission to do the walk in New York City, but, in April 2014, announced he was scouting skyscrapers in Chicago, Illinois for a televised tight walk event for the Discovery Channel. Wallenda said he was very interested in tight walking between the Willis Tower with another nearby skyscraper. On November 2, 2014, Discovery aired the special, entitled Skyscraper Live, and an official mobile game, SkyBalance by Nik Wallenda, was developed by Tapinator, Inc. to coincide with the event. In the special, Wallenda completed two tightrope walks, setting two new Guinness World Records: one for walking the steepest tightrope incline between two buildings (19 degrees) and the other for the highest tightrope walk while blindfolded.

=== Volcano Live ===
On March 4, 2020, Wallenda successfully walked across the Masaya Volcano in Nicaragua, his longest stunt in terms of time on the wire.

Before Nik's stunt, his wife Erendira performed an aerial routine over the mouth of the volcano. The couple had decided to add the extra performance the morning before the event, with Nik expressing nervousness before his wife took to the wire. Like her husband, Erendira donned a gas mask and a pair of goggles for protection from the volcanic fumes.

During his walk, ABC required Wallenda to use a guide wire, to the chagrin of some viewers.

Despite the required safety equipment, Wallenda was visibly buffeted by the wind and had to slow down to catch his bearings several times during the walk.

During the last part of his ascent out of the crater, Wallenda removed his protective equipment to address the crowd.

=== D'Youville College: Health Professions Hub Grand Opening ===
On June 17, 2021, Wallenda highwire walked at D'Youville College in Buffalo, New York for a grand opening ceremony of the Health Professions Hub. The stunt was a 320-foot walk on a wire 5/8 inch thick between D'Youville's Montante Family Library to the new Health Professions Hub Building. The wire was positioned 5-stories high and designed to be a tethered walk. However, Wallenda stated that the tether got stuck near the end of the walk and removed the tether to free walk the final steps. The highwire walk began at the end of the grand opening ceremony with a conversation between Wallenda and D'Youville College President, Dr. Lorrie Clemo, where Wallenda claimed to have the key necessary to unlock the Health Professions Hub so that the crowd could tour the building. Wallenda stated, "I was just in the library and I found a key on the floor ... I guess I'll take the shortcut" then he proceeded to walk the highwire from D'Youville's Library to the Health Professions Hub building.

=== Future plans ===
In the long run, Wallenda's goal is to achieve global recognition and celebrity. "I've had a vision for my name since I was very young, that I was going to take it to the top of my industry", he says. His wirewalking "wishlist" includes traversing the Bosphorus continental divide in Turkey and Inca ruins at Machu Picchu. He would like to do an event with the Eiffel Tower and Egypt's pyramids. "There's a lot of expectations on my end", he says, adding that he wants to "[reinvent] the circus". "Whenever we're someplace unique or different", says Erendira, "he's always looking around – 'Oh, I could string a wire from here to there and walk there.'" Wallenda, who spent the summer of 2014 in Western New York with shows at Darien Lake and the Erie County Fair, hopes to develop a longer-term tourist attraction near Niagara Falls honoring stuntmen such as his family.

== Personal life ==
In 1999, Wallenda proposed to his future wife Erendira (née Vasquez, from a famous Mexican circus family), while on a wire 30 feet (9.1 m) high during a performance in Montreal, Quebec. Having just performed a seven-man pyramid act with his family, he stayed on the platform while the family descended. He walked to the middle of the wire and got down on one knee, proposing to Erendira in front of 25,000 people. A week later, they were married. "I don't know if either of us could be married to someone who didn't perform", says Erendira. "I can't see either of us ever being happy sitting behind a desk."

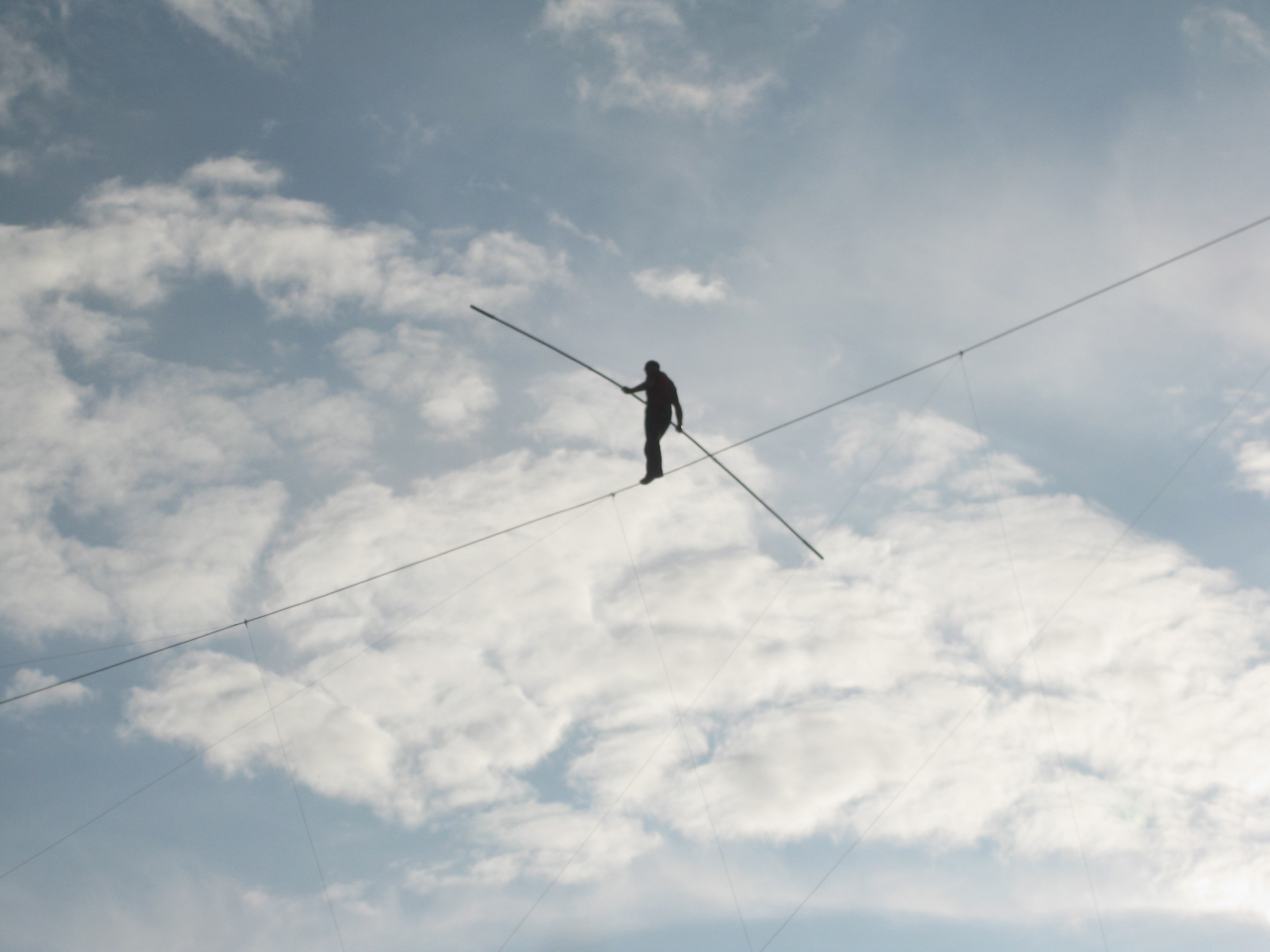
Wallenda walks a tightrope at Canada's Wonderland theme park

Wallenda credits God for his success, saying that what he does on the high-wire is a gift from God. He grew up in "a Bible-believing, God-fearing family" and describes himself as a "born-again Christian". Faith is "the most important part of my life", he says.

Wallenda and his wife have three children. Before every wire walk, Wallenda joins his family in prayer and he always wears a cross as he performs. He remarks, "The Bible says pray without ceasing and I'm always praying." He denies that his stunts "test" God. "To test God would be to never train, never practice, and then to walk across the Grand Canyon; or to jump off a building, or throw myself in front of a truck", he says. Wallenda says he tries to live "an upright life" and be a good example. Despite his success, Wallenda wants people to think of him as just a regular guy. "I want people to like me, just for who I am", he says. "What you get is a regular person. I want people to relate to me."

Wallenda believes that through hard work, one can achieve anything they desire. "I think [challenges are] what life is about", he remarks. "We all go through challenges. But once we get through them, we look back and say look how much our lives have changed by going through that challenge."
