= Karl Wallenda =

German stunt performer (1905–1978)

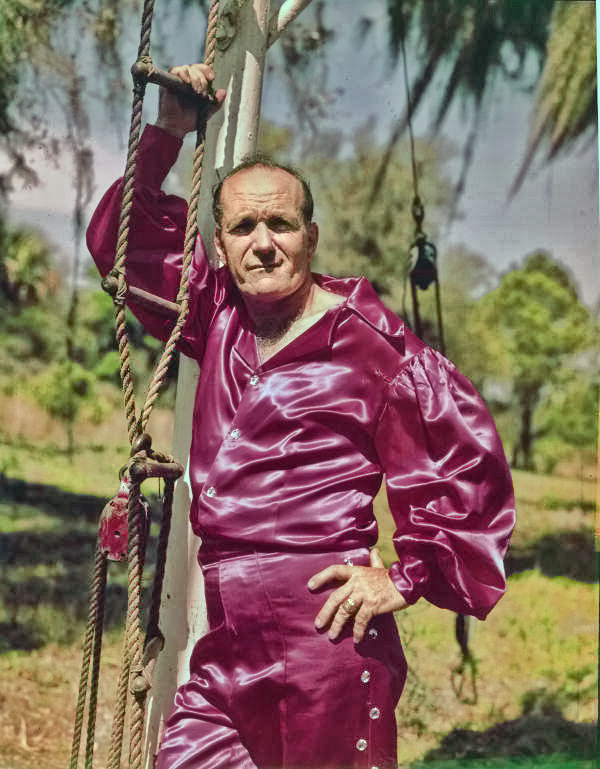
- Wallenda in Sarasota, Florida, 1960s
- Born: January 21, 1905; Magdeburg, Prussia, German Empire
- Died: March 22, 1978 (aged 73); San Juan, Puerto Rico
- Cause of death: Accidental fall
- Occupations: Daredevil, circus performer
- Spouse: Helen Kreis Wallenda
- Relatives: Nik Wallenda (great-grandson)

Karl Wallenda (/wɔːˈlɛndə/; January 21, 1905 – March 22, 1978) was a German-American high wire artist. He was the founder of The Flying Wallendas, a daredevil circus troupe whose members performed dangerous stunts far above the ground, often without a safety net.

== Personal life ==
Wallenda was born in 1905 in Magdeburg, Germany. His parents were Kunigunde (Jameson) and Engelbert Wallenda, and he began performing with his family at the age of six.

== The Great Wallendas ==
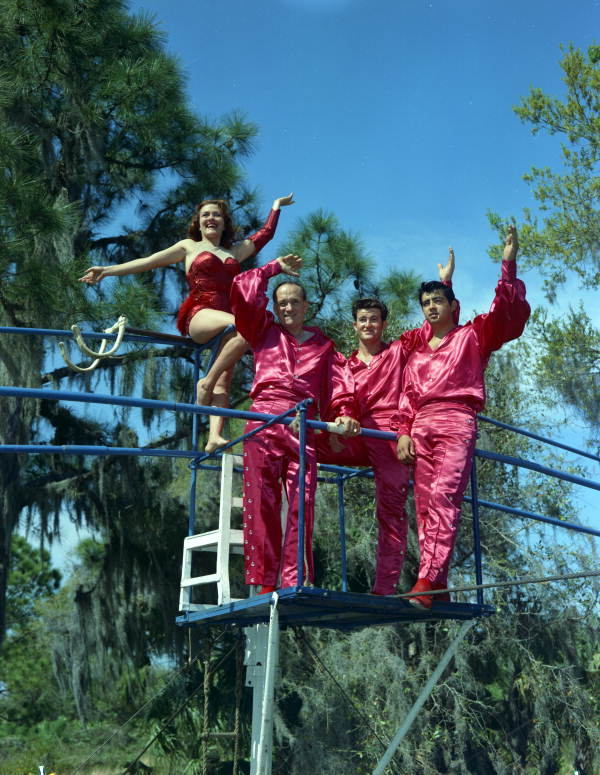
Wallenda (second from left), c. 1965

The Great Wallendas were noted throughout Europe for their four-man pyramid and cycling on the high wire. The act moved to the United States in 1928, performing as freelancers. In 1947, they developed the unequaled three-tier 7-Man Pyramid. Karl Wallenda had the idea since 1938, but it took until 1946, when he and his brother Hermann developed it and had the right acrobats for it. The Great Wallendas, a 1978 made-for-TV movie starring Karl Wallenda, depicts the act's comeback after a fatal accident involving several family members during a performance. Wallenda was killed in a high wire accident in San Juan, Puerto Rico, 38 days after it was first broadcast.

== Daredevil stunts ==
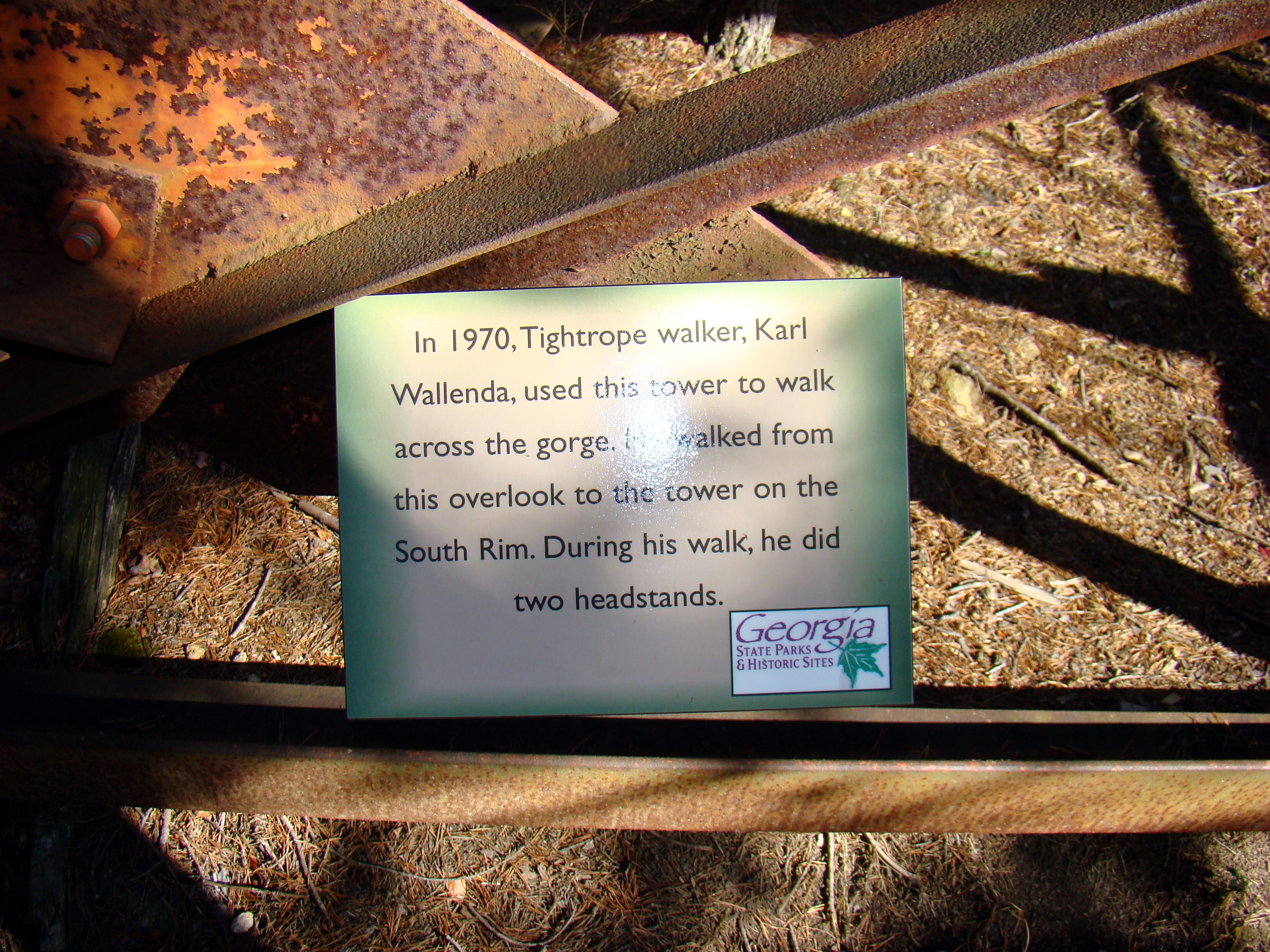
Site marker at Tallulah Gorge State Park

On July 18, 1970, a 65-year-old Wallenda performed a high-wire walk, also known as a skywalk, across the Tallulah Gorge, a gorge formed by the Tallulah River in Georgia. An estimated 30,000 people watched Wallenda perform two headstands as he crossed the quarter-mile-wide gap.

In 1974, at 69 years old, he broke a world skywalk distance record of 1,800 feet (550 m) at Kings Island, a record that stood until July 4, 2008, when his great-grandson, Nik Wallenda, completed a 2,000-foot skywalk (610 m) at the same location.

== Death ==
In 1978, at age 73, Wallenda attempted a walk between the two towers of the ten-story Condado Plaza Hotel in San Juan, Puerto Rico, on a wire stretched 121 ft (37 metres) above the pavement. As a result of high winds and an improperly secured wire, he lost his balance and fell during the attempt, his body striking a taxi. Wallenda was pronounced dead after his body arrived at the hospital. This was not viewed on most television stations, but a film crew from local station WAPA-TV in San Juan taped the fall with narration by anchorman Guillermo José Torres.

== Family members ==
- Nik Wallenda, Karl's great-grandson, continues the family tradition of performing stunts on highwire without a safety net, while at times wearing a safety harness.
- Mario Wallenda, adopted son of Karl, fell along with Karl during an attempt to perform the 7-Person Pyramid on January 30, 1962, leaving him paralyzed from the waist down. He died April 12, 2015.
- Karl Wallenda established the Wallenda Dynasty with his two daughters, Jenny and Carla.
- Jenny's children, Tino, Delilah, and Tammy, formed their own troupes.
- Carla helped train her children Rick, Rietta, Mario, and Valerie. Rick and Rietta still perform today. Valerie retired to raise her family and their brother Mario B. died in 1993.

== See also ==
- Tightrope walking
