= Clown alley (disambiguation) =

A Clown alley is a backstage area at a circus in which clowns change into costume and apply makeup

Clown Alley may also refer to:

- Clown Alley (band), a 1980s San Francisco Bay Area punk rock band.
- Clown Alley (restaurant), a defunct San Francisco restaurant on Columbus Ave specializing in hamburgers.
- an individual chapter of Clowns of America International
- a professional or fraternal organisation of clowns in general
- Clown Alley a one-hour 1966 TV movie, starring The Alan Copeland Singers.
