= Ritual clown =

Characteristic feature of the ritual life of many traditional religions

Ritual clowns, also known as sacred clowns, are a characteristic feature of the ritual life of many traditional religions, and they typically employ scatology and obscenities. Ritual clowning is where comedy and satire originated. In Ancient Greece, ritual clowning, phallic processions and ritual aischrologia found their literary form in the plays of Aristophanes.

Two famous examples of ritual clowns in North America are the Koyemshis (also known as Koyemshi, Koyemci or Mudheads) and the Newekwe (also spelled Ne'wekwe or Neweekwe). French sociologist Jean Cazeneuve is particularly renowned for elucidating the role of ritual clowns; reprising Ruth Benedict's famous distinction of societies into Apollonian and Dionysian, he said that precisely because of the strictly repressive (apollonian) nature of the Zuni society, the ritual clowns are needed as a dionysian element, a safety valve through which the community can give symbolic satisfaction to the antisocial tendencies. The Koyemshis clowns are characterized by a saturnalian symbolism.

== See also ==
- Avadhuta
- Clown
- Booger dance
- Chou role
- Clown society
- Contrary (social role)
- Divine madness
- The Fool (tarot card)
- Foolishness for Christ
- Heyoka
- Jester
- Pueblo clown
- Sacred Clowns
- Sisters of Perpetual Indulgence
- Trickster
