= Kôrêdugaw =

Society of sacred clowns in Mali

A kôrêduga in Ségou in 2022

The kôrêdugaw (Note: Also spelled kóróduga) (sing. kôrêduga; also known by other regional names) are a society of sacred clowns in Mali. They are part of secret societies including the Kore society of the Bambara people. They are associated with comedy as well as wisdom and morality.

Kôrêdugaw play a role defying social conventions and behaving ridiculously, with behaviors such as gluttony. Their comedy also involves mockery and obscene humor. Their ritual roles include promoting morality through their seemingly immoral behavior as well as providing advice and mediation. Their work includes street performances, in which a kôrêduga dances and leads a crowd through a neighborhood, as well as theatrical and festive performances, with distinctive music, dance, and plays. Their style is associated with uselessness, repurposing trash as wearable items. They are also distinguished by necklaces made of red beans. Kôrêdugaw may come from any background and are mixed-gender (though some groups are all-male). Members are not necessarily hereditary, and they undergo initiation during childhood.

Kôrêdugaw exist among several ethnic groups of Mali, including the Bambara and Senufo. The origin of kôrêdugaw predates records. Their numbers have decreased amid the spread of Islam and urbanization. The tradition was listed as UNESCO Intangible Cultural Heritage for Mali in 2011.

== Membership ==
Kôrêdugaw are identified by necklaces made of red beans.

The kôrêdugaw are a type of ritual clown or buffoon with a sacred role. They exist within several ethnic groups of Mali, including the Bambara, Senufo, Mandinka, and Samogo. The word kôrêdugaw is used in the Bambara language. It comes from the name of the divine entity Koré and the word duga, meaning 'vulture'. Among the Senufo, around the city of Sikasso, kôrêdugaw are known as mpɔgɔfee (sing. mpɔgɔfɔ). (Note: Names in other Senufo languages include mpwugni, mpuwi, and xodubalaa.)

The kôrêdugaw form secret societies. Like other initiation societies in the region, groups of kôrêdugaw serve their respective communities. Though some inherit the status of kôrêduga, others are trained by a master or chosen through divination. This is different from hereditary classes of performers, such as griots.

Initiations occur every 3–7 years, depending on local practices, teaching members how to deal with life and social problems. Kôrêdugaw are often members of the [[Koré society|koré society]], a Bambara secret society of men, though they may form their own separate societies. Koré members act in a joyous, childlike manner, exemplified by the kôrêdugaw.

Kôrêdugaw include people of different ages, genders, professional classes, and ethnic and religious backgrounds. Bambara kôrêdugaw are all-male, whereas Senufo mpɔgɔfee are mixed-gender. (Note: Ethnologist Ingrid Monson associates the mixed-gender status of Senufo mpɔgɔfee with the fact that the Senufo are a matrilineal but patrilocal society, as well as their religious belief in gender complementarity.) Kôrêdugaw are initiated by the age of 7, and the final stage of their career occurs between the ages of 42 and 63, after which they limit their appearances. At 63, they achieve a status believed to transcend the ordinary world.

Among the Senufo, the status of mpɔgɔfɔ is believed to be destiny, with a new member being chosen through divination before becoming an apprentice of an elder mpɔgɔfɔ. Among the Senufo, many societies initiate members when they are seven years old, after which male and female members enter "false marriages", in which they spend time together like spouses but cannot enter a sexual relationship. Even once they are actually married, they maintain close relationships with their false spouses. The inclusion of women in roles such as kôrêdugaw may create a setting in which men and women have equal power.

The status of kôrêdugaw is marked by outfits including necklaces made of red beans, as well as many other items. Other symbols of the kôrêdugaw include the vulture and the horse. Within the Senufo community, there are regional differences in kôrêdugaw; those of Kadiolo are symbolized by a sculpture of a hornbill.

== Function ==
Kôrêdugaw in 2020

Kôrêdugaw are associated with both comedy and wisdom. Humorous and ritual elements are both important to their job. In addition to comedy, their roles include promoting friendliness and prevent conflict, and they are tasked with bringing good harvests and child health. Their are experts in herbalism, using plants for medicine, fertility, luck, and blessings. Kôrêdugaw also act as mediators. In Senufo culture, their sharp perception of other people is compared to the vulture's sharp vision. As the performances of kôrêdugaw are associated with comedy, ethical reflection, and facilitation of negotiation, they have similar roles as griots, such as the such as the jeli of the Mandé people.

Kôrêdugaw bring ridiculous elements into everyday activities. They are permitted to act contrary to all social conventions. Within the Bambara religion, spiritual pleasure is associated with being one with God; this is reflected in the freedom and lewdness of the kôrêdugaw. Kôrêdugaw actions involve wordplay, gluttony, and scatological humor (such as publicly farting). They may mock any subject.

A major purpose of kôrêdugaw is to discourage immorality. As described by 20th-century anthropologist Roland Colin, they "guarantee the validity of social rules by learning their opposite". They impart social values through performances that parallel the real world, and they are also associated with protecting women and children. Values they promote include knowledge, generosity, tolerance, and inoffensiveness. However, those unfamiliar with kôrêdugaw may wrongly believe them to be immoral.

The aesthetic of kôrêdugaw is identified with the Bambara word kolon, meaning 'worn out' and connoting uselessness. Kôrêdugaw often utilize junk materials, and they may have nicknames such as "Old Basket", "Old Trash", and "Shameless". This reflects Malian cultural views on waste management, finding ways to reuse useless things and allows kôrêdugaw to form a self-image with a unique relationship with objects.

== Performances ==
=== Types of performances ===
Kôrêdugaw performing at a cultural event in 2020

Kôrêdugaw perform on the street or at special events, generally being invited by event hosts and local leaders. Their perform at events of various scales, including religious, secular, cultural, and political gatherings, as well as weddings. They are an important part of festivals. Among the Senufo, they are commonly found at parties, acting as the master of ceremonies. Kôrêdugaw performances include jokes, dance, blessings, and taking donations. They often perform as soldiers or hunters, with props resembling guns and horses.

Typical kôrêdugaw performances take place in public spaces—streets, courtyards, and markets. A kôrêduga sings and dances through the street as people gather around them. They kôrêduga pauses to give blessings and receive gifts. They may visit hundreds of households in a day; a performance may involve quickly going between houses and storefronts, or it may remain in a spot for longer if a good audience is gathering. Disrupting the typical routine of the public space, their presence creates a routine that must stay steady while keeping an audience engaged. The performer responds to outside occurences and audience members' levels of enthusiasm. Some responses are universal; for instance, when an elder or an individual of high social status joins, the crowd chants a greeting: "Hé! Ba boira!" At times, the kôrêduga may lead the audience in a game or a circle dance. The moments with the highest energy are the most important to the performer.

Some performances of kôrêdugaw are theatrical. Like other comedic figures in Bambara society, kôrêdugaw appear in satirical plays known as kotéba. The characters are introduced through a musical prologue, with the kôrêduga singing about how much food he can eat. Kôrêdugaw perform satirical scenes, such as one lamenting about their relationships with their fathers and inability to find wives. They also perform songs with irreverent or sexual comments toward girls. Other acts are religious; in one, a kôrêduga dresses like a horse and runs around aimlessly, representing the unachievable desire for immortality.

Certain songs and dances are associated with kôrêdugaw, indicating their role to an audience. Their songs address various social topics. They use many instruments. Within Senufo music, they have a distinct genre; it is one of several genres to use the balafon, collectively known as ncintoige. There are many songs in the genre. An example is "Kɔrɔduga Ngolo", narrated by a kôrêduga—the titular Ngolo—with the lyrics, "I'm here, I'm here, I want to sell my penis. Who wants to buy my penis?"

=== Behaviors ===
Kôrêdugaw perform in the role of people without shame. As gluttons, kôrêdugaw eat anything they can, cooked or not, and are particularly interested in food scraps. For example, when the dish tô is prepared, kôrêdugaw drink the water used to wash the pot. They often eat fast, leaving food around their mouths. Their gluttony violates the social order by reducing food to a useless thing and by refusing to share. Meanwhile, their consumption of scraps has a ritual association with maximizing food production. Gluttony is associated with the vulture symbol as well as the hyena.

To provide advice, kôrêdugaw may address particular audience members without naming them, through the veil of fictional stories and fables. These may suggest solutions to problems or potential marriages, and their advice is given serious weight as spiritual leaders. Kôrêdugaw, as unconventional figures, are also symbolically associated with marginalized individuals. In their performances, they may address such people and dance with them. These include childless married women, who face rejection in Bambara society. Such women turn to many ritual professionals, but kôrêdugaw are seen as a last resort. In such cases, the couple swears a vow to the kôrêdugaw, and, once the baby is born, the society symbolically adopts it, giving it a nickname and social network. By incorporating social outcasts into their activities, kôrêdugaw aim to draw attention to them and the societal causes of their struggles.

The gestures of kôrêdugaw are expressive and often obscene. As they are both comedic and ritual, their meaning of their behaviors may vary. For example, a sexually suggestive gesture may have a comedic tone, as a joke about masculinity or shame, but it may be more serious, as a symbol of eroticism or a narrative element about fertility. The tone also varies depending on the type of performance. A performance must fit the atmosphere of an event; many kôrêdugaw have experience performing in all settings. When a kôrêduga performs on the street or at an event such as a wedding, it is expected that audience members dance; on the other hand, a stage performance does not involve audience participation.

== Clothing ==
Kôrêdugaw often wear unusual clothing, such as large glasses and a patchwork of various fabrics.

Kôrêdugaw are often distinguished by their unusual outfits, which spark humor and confusion. The status of kôrêduga is not defined by particular clothing. Active kôrêdugaw are often expected to dress to fit the role, but not all wear distinctive outfits. Unlike many groups of people, identified by certain types of clothing, kôrêdugaw can wear whatever they want, meaning that the group identity of kôrêdugaw is defined by their differences, rather than their similarities. They also differ from most people in that their clothing is not determined by the occasion or their social class; even at an event where everyone else buys new clothing, the kôrêdugaw wear their worn-out materials.

Kôrêdugaw assemble outfits out of junk and used clothing, which may involve wearing torn fabrics or repurposing broken objects that would otherwise be useless. Even when wearing new materials, they "contaminate" the outfit with old fabric or accessories such as plastic bottles. Materials are often incorporated into outfits in ways that make them clearly visible but bears no connection to their original purpose.

Most kôrêdugaw wear simple, ordinary clothes, but in unusual ways, such as wearing clothes of the opposite gender or lacking symmetry. Thus, women, who typically wear skirts, instead wear baggy pants and patchwork tunics. There also exist forms of clothing unique to kôrêdugaw. One common outfit for male kôrêdugaw is a tunic covered in pieces of various fabrics, shaped as to shake as the wearer dances. (Note: A variation of this outfit, seen in a 1960 photograph by Dominique Zahan, is covered in millet stalks instead of fabric.) The other outfit unique to kôrêdugaw is a tunic and pants made of flour sacks. It is also common for kôrêdugaw to dress as a particular role. A common example is for male kôrêdugaw to dress as hunters; other outfits include military uniforms and greasy t-shirts resembling that of a motorcycle mechanic.

Layered clothing and accessories are an important part of kôrêdugaw outfits. They may style their necklaces with plastic beads, seashells, nuts, bottle caps, cartridge cases, or bags of medicinal plants. On their faces, they may wear broken glasses or large goggles made from calabash gourds. Headwear includes colorful caps, old wigs that have lost their shine, or donkey ears. Other accessories include belts made of bottle caps, plastic bottles hanging from the waste, or everyday objects—such as fishing nets or curtains—tied around the neck. Taken as a whole, the kôrêduga's outfit does not resemble its parts—for example, wearing donkey ears does not mean they are dressed as a donkey.

== History ==
1906 postcard by François-Edmond Fortier, possibly the first photograph of kôrêdugaw (Note: Several features identify Fortier's postcard as a picture of a kôrêdugaw initiation play: the man in the center wears fronds, typical of the play's protagonist; the man next to him has a rifle; and the rightmost man has a prop of a horse.)

Kôrêdugaw have existed since time immemorial. They may have emerged out of the need for humor as a distraction from social problems. According to tradition, one of their roles was to finish a stock of food that was going to rot through their gluttonous eating.

In a 1906 postcard from Ségou, the photographer François-Edmond Fortier depicted a kôrêdugaw initiation, though he did not identify it as such. According to historian Daniela Moreau, this is the first known photograph of a kôrêduga. Another early photographic depiction is from Marcel Griaule in 1931.

Secret society of the Kôrêdugaw, the rite of wisdom in Mali
- UNESCO Intangible Cultural Heritage
- Country: Mali
- Reference: 00520

Inscription history
- Inscription: 2011 (6th session)
- List: Need of Urgent Safeguarding

By the 21st century, societal changes have led to a decrease in kôrêdugaw, and people have become less interested in the lifelong commitment required. The spread of Islam has lessened the significance of initiation ceremonies. Urbanization has also decreased the number of initiatiations and rituals. The region's people have continued to celebrate the kôrêdugaw. For example, during a 2014 visit by Prime Minister Moussa Mara to Sikasso, regional officials put on a show of kôrêdugaw and members of another Senufo society, the koori. Many kôrêdugaw have brought their work to modern types of performance to continue its existence.

The state of Mali has worked on initiatives to preserve the tradition, with the involvement of kôrêdugaw associations. The National Directorate of Cultural Heritage added it to the National Inventiory of Cultural Heritage in 2010. UNESCO recognized the practice as Intangible Cultural Heritage for Mali in 2011, inscribing it on the List of Intangible Cultural Heritage in Need of Urgent Safeguarding.
