= Contrary (social role) =

Role in some indigenous American cultures

A Contrary, in some Native American cultures, is a person who adopts behavior deliberately the opposite of other tribal members. They play roles in certain ceremonies, as well as in the social structures of some communities. Some of the cultures who have roles for contraries also have small societies or organized groups of contraries.

The Contraries are related, in part, to the clown organizations of the Plains Indians, as well as to Plains military societies that contained reverse warriors. The Lakota heyoka (heyókȟa "sacred clown"), are the traditional contraries in the Oceti Sakowin (Očhéthi Šakówiŋ).

== Cultural role ==
The Contraries of the Plains Indians are traditionally individuals committed to an extraordinary life-style in which they do the opposite of what others normally do. They thus turn all social conventions into their opposites.

The role of the Plains Indian Contraries is primarily ceremonial since they often play key roles in sacred ceremonies, dances and feasts. Unlike the clowns, the special role of the Contraries has not been traditionally restricted to brief performances, ceremonies or war preparations. It is their everyday life. The Contraries of the Plains Indians are unique and historically unprecedented. John Plant examined the ethnological phenomena of contrary behavior, particularly in the tribes of the North American Plains Indians.

Contrary behavior means deliberately doing the opposite of what others routinely or conventionally do. Traditionally, it is usually accompanied by inverse speech, in which one says the opposite of what one actually means. For example, "no!" expresses "yes!" And "hello" means "goodbye". To say "Grandfather, go away!" would be an invitation for him to come.

== Reverse warriors ==
In addition to the Contraries and the ceremonial clowns, many Plains tribes have recognized certain persons having the role of "reverse" warriors. These are usually experienced warriors who in battle purposely abide by contrary, foolish or crazy principles. Generally, they belong to military organizations that also take part in dance ceremonies. Only the "reverse" warriors use inverse speech, and only they do the opposite of what they are commanded or instructed to do (reverse reaction). The "reverse" warrior has been known to charge into battle when ordered to retreat, and to only fall back when commanded to attack.

== Publications ==
George B. Grinnell published his work on Contraries based on his visits to the Cheyenne around 1898. Written accounts of the heyoka of the Lakota and Santee were published even earlier. The cultural anthropologist Julian Steward described various forms of contrary behavior in 1930. In 1945, Verne Ray examined contrary behavior in the ritual dances and ceremonies of North American Indians and differentiated a further characteristic of the contrary complex of the Plains Indians, "reverse reaction," which means to do the opposite of what one is asked.
