= Clown alley =

Backstage area of a circus

A group of clowns waiting for the Old Milwaukee Days parade to start, 1973

The clown alley in a circus is a backstage area, usually very near the animal pens, where clowns change into their costumes and apply makeup. Generally, the clowns' personal props, costumes, and other items are stored in this area as well. Clown alley was usually very close to the Big Top tents, along the side like an alley, so the clowns could get in and out quickly. If the circus show had some problem with a performance, the ringmaster could yell out "Clowns Allez" meaning “Clowns Go!” Today, most clowns do not use tents for dressing and make up, as travel trailers or motor homes are used. The term has also come to mean any professional grouping of clowns, in general, regardless of whether or not they are affiliated with a circus or carnival.

In Clowns of America International, "clown alley" is the name given to individual chapters, which function similarly to a union. A Clown Alley Local will co-ordinate social events as well as professional development for members, as well as direct employment opportunities.
