= Ridiculous (disambiguation) =

To be ridiculous is to be highly incongruous or inferior.

Ridiculous may also refer to:

- Ridiculous (album), an album by the British New Wave group Squeeze
- Ridiculous, a 2006 comedy album by Norm Macdonald
- "Ridiculous", a song by Gucci Mane, Yo Gotti, Lonnie Mac, and OJ da Juiceman from the 2009 DJ Drama album Gangsta Grillz: The Album (Vol. 2)
- "Ridiculous", a song by P.O.D. from Satellite
- Ridiculous!, a 2002 book by David Kaufman

== See also ==
- Theatre of the Ridiculous, a theatrical genre
- Fort Ridiculous, Long Point, Cape Cod, Massachusetts, USA; an American Civil War fort
- Riddiculous, a British game show
- Ridiculousness, an American TV series
- Ridicule (disambiguation)
