= COAI =

COAI may refer to:

- Cellular Operators Association of India
- Clowns of America International
