= Ridicule (disambiguation) =

Ridicule may refer to:

- A form of mockery
  - Appeal to ridicule, an informal fallacy which presents an opponent's argument as absurd
  - Ridiculous, to be something which is highly incongruous or inferior
- Ridicule (film), a 1996 French film set in the 18th century
- "Ridicule", a song by the Kleptones from A Night at the Hip Hopera

== See also ==
- Ridiculous (disambiguation)
- Ridiculousness (disambiguation)
