= John Plant (ethnologist) =

American ethnologist

John Plant (born 1954 in New Haven, Connecticut) is an American ethnologist, biologist and expert on the culture of the Plains Indians.

== Academic career ==
Plant studied anthropology at Windham College in Putney (Vermont, USA), graduating with the B.A. degree (1976), and biology at the Southern Connecticut State University, New Haven (Connecticut, USA), with the B.S. degree (1978). He continued the study of biology at the Albert-Ludwigs-Universität im Breisgau (Germany), acquiring the Diplom degree (1985). Afterwards, Plant began an investigation on the contraries and clowns of the Plains Indians. With his doctoral thesis on this topic he earned the Dr. phil. (1994) under the supervision of Prof. Ulrich Köhler and Dr. Lothar Käser at the Institut für Völkerkunde of the Universität Freiburg (Germany).

Since 1998, Plant has been a science associate of the Department of Evolutionary Biology (Faculty of Life Sciences, Center of Zoology) at the University of Vienna (Austria) with research interests in bees and their evolution.

== Heyoka ==
The Sioux equally applied the name and concept Heyoka to their clowns as well as their contraries. John Plant examined both of these ethnological phenomena among the Plains Indians, in particular the following tribes:

- Sioux
- Cheyenne
- Comanche
- Pawnee
- Arikaree
- Hidatsa
- Absarokee
- Ponca.

The contraries of the Plains Indians were individuals devoted to an extraordinary life-style in which they consistently and continually did the opposite of what others normally do. They thus turned all conventions to their opposites (Heyoka, p. 10). While the clowns represented ceremonial figures and their performances were restricted to rituals, dances and ceremonies, the contraries practiced day and night a contrary lifestyle: thus on a certain level the contrary acted as an antagonist to his own people.

== Publications ==
- Heyoka. Die Contraries und Clowns der Plainsindianer. Verlag für Amerikanistik, Wyk auf Föhr (Germany) 1994.
- "Crazy Dogs and Foolish Men: Sidelights on Plains Indian Culture". In: Eveline Dürr; Stefan Seitz (Editors): Religionsethnologische Beiträge zur Amerikanistik. Ethnologische Studien Bd. 31. Lit Verlag, Münster (Germany) 1997.
