= Clown society =

Organization of comedic entertainers

Clown society is a term used in anthropology and sociology for an organization of comedic entertainers (or "clowns") who have a formalized role in a culture or society.

== Description and function ==
Sometimes clown societies have a sacred role, to represent a trickster character in religious ceremonies. Other times the purpose served by members of a clown society is only to parody excessive seriousness, or to deflate pomposity.

In the sense of how clowns function in their culture:

- A clown shows what is wrong with the ordinary way of doing things.
- A clown shows how to do ordinary things the "wrong way". By doing ordinary things "the wrong way" the clown reveals what would otherwise be perceived as the serious or true state of things in a different fashion.

Members of a clown society may dress in a special costume reserved for clowns, which is often a ridiculously extreme or improper form of normal dress. Some members paint their body with horizontal black and white stripes, which represents a skeleton. (Note: ... leur corps est peint souvent de raies blanches et noires qui leur donnent plus ou moins l'apparence de squelettes.... "their bodies are often painted with black and white stripes which give them more or less the appearance of skeletons." — Cazeneuve (1957))

In the case of the Zuni clown society of the Puebloans, "one is initiated into the Ne'wekwe order by a ritual of filth-eating" where "mud is smeared on the body for the clown performance, and parts of the performance may consist of sporting with mud, smearing and daubing it, or drinking and pouring it onto one another". The sacred clown and his apparently antisocial behavior is condoned in Native American ceremonies. (Note: "The sacred clown and his apparently antisocial behavior which is condoned in Indian ceremonies seems outrageous to Western people who believe it is savage for a culture to institutionalize behavior that seems to be psychotic and perverted." — Shanley (1997))

While in their costume, clowns have special permission from their society to parody or criticize defective aspects of their own culture. They are always required to be funny. In the case of the jester at the English Royal Court with his cap of bells and pig's bladder stick he was allowed to make fun of, be indelicate and sometimes downright rude to members of the royal family and their entourage without fear of reprisal. Other persons living within the same culture nearly always recognize a clown when they see one, but seldom consciously understand what the clowns do for their society. The typical explanation is "He's just a funny man."

Clown societies usually train new members to become clowns. The training normally takes place by an apprentice system, although there may be some rote schooling as well. Sometimes the training is improvisational comedy, but usually a clown society trains members in well known forms of costume, pantomime, song, dance, and common visual gags. On rare occasions the training includes scripted performances, or skits, which are part of a standard repertoire that "never gets old", and is expected by members of the culture that the clown society is embedded in.

Humor assumes a "sacred position within ceremonials" in many Native North American societies; examples are found in trickster traditions, Pueblo clown societies, Cherokee booger dances, and aspects of the Northwest Coast potlatch. Humor is a fundamental aspect of Native American life, and has many purposes related to sacred rituals and social cohesion.

== Examples ==
- Circus clowns function as a clown society, in Western culture.
- Sacred clowns are called heyoka in Lakota and Dakota, and Pueblo clown in Hopi and Tewa Native American cultures.

== Difference from school for comedians ==
A clown society is different from, but closely related to a school for comedians. Comedians serve many of the same social functions of parody and social criticism, and also embody the role of the trickster, but a comedian usually only uses slightly exaggerated mannerisms to show that they are joking. Comedians who are not also clowns do not wear a blatantly outrageous or formalized costume.

== See also ==
- Heyoka
- Jester
- Kiva
- Liminality
- Pueblo clown
- Satirist
- Sin-eater
- Trickster
