= World Clown Association =

Organization for clown arts

- Founder: Herb Metz
- Location: United States
- Official language: English
- President: Max Kaufman

The World Clown Association (WCA) is a worldwide organization for clowns, jugglers, magicians, mimes, and face painters. It holds an annual convention, mainly in the United States.

== Origin and history ==
Herb Metz was the main instigator and driving force behind the establishment of the World Clown Association. Herb had been the President of the Clowns of America prior to the time of their financial difficulties and ultimate organization breakup. Herb had a vision of an organization wherein the members would have controlling interest in the association. Along with the help of some influential friends in the Southeast Clown Association, he put together the framework for an organization. He convinced various persons to serve ad hoc in various officer capacities until such time that a general membership meeting could take place.

The first WCA convention was held in Atlanta, Georgia, United States in 1983. In 1987, the World Clown Association established the first known clown scholarship fund. In memory of Dean Weiss, the Bo-Dino Memorial Educational Scholarship was established to benefit individuals interested in pursuing training at an established clown training program. In 1991, the first non-US convention was held in Bognor Regis, England.

Past president Randy Christensen has voiced disapproval of the 2016 clown sightings.
