= Jean Cazeneuve =

French sociologist and anthropologist (1915–2005)

- Born: 17 May 1915; Ussel, France
- Died: 4 October 2005 (aged 90); Paris, France
- Education: École normale supérieure Harvard University; University of Toulouse
- Occupation: Television executive
- Known for: President of TF1 (1975-78)

Jean Cazeneuve (17 May 1915 – 4 October 2005) was a French sociologist and anthropologist. Apart from being a scholar, he has been involved with Radio and TV at the executive level; from 1964 till 1974 he has been president of the French public Radio and TV agency (ORTF), after which he has been chairman of TF1, the first French national-wide channel, till 1978. He joined the Académie des Sciences Morales et Politiques in 1973, of which became president in 1983.

He is highly regarded for his illuminating contribution to the study the ritual clowns.

== Works ==
- La Psychologie du prisonnier de guerre, 1944
- C'est mourir beaucoup, 1944
- Psychologie de la joie, 1952
- Les dieux dansent à Cibola: le Shalako des indiens zuñis, 1957
- Les Rites et la condition humaine, 1959
- La Philosophie médicale de Ravaisson, 1959
- La Mentalité archaîque, 1961
- Sociologie de la radio-télévision, 1963
- Lucien Lévy-Bruhl, 1963
- La Grande Chance de la télévision, 1963
- Les Mythologies, 1966
- Bonheur et civilisation, 1966
- L'Ethnologie, 1967
- Sociologie de Marcel Mauss, 1968
- Les Pouvoirs de la télévision, 1970
- La Sociologie, 1970
- Guide de l'étudiant en sociologie, 1971
- Sociologie du rite (tabou, magie, sacré), 1971
- La Société de l’ubiquité, 1972
- L'Homme téléspectateur, 1974
- La Sociologie et les sciences de la société, 1974
- Les Communications de masse, 1976
- Dix grandes notions de la sociologie, 1976
- Aimer la vie, 1977
- Des métiers pour un sociologue, 1978
- La Raison d’être, 1981
- La Vie dans la société moderne, 1982
- Le Mot pour rire, 1983
- Histoire des dieux, des sociétés et des hommes, 1985
- De l’optimisme, 1987
- Les Hasards d’une vie, des primitifs aux téléspectateurs, 1989
- Et si plus rien n’était sacré, 1991
- La Télévision en sept procès, 1992
- La Personne et la société, 1995
- Du calembour, du mot d’esprit, 1996
- L'Avenir de la morale, 1998
- Les Roses de la vie. Variations sur la joie et le bonheur, 1999
