= Pueblo clown =

Generic term for jesters or tricksters in the Pueblo religion

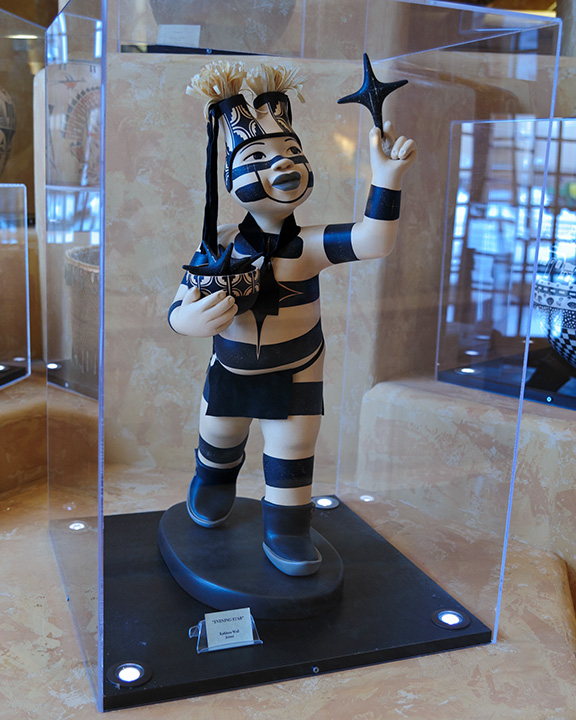
Ceramic sacred clown by Kathleen Wall Jemez Pueblo, New Mexico

The Pueblo clowns (sometimes called Koshare or sacred clowns) are jesters or tricksters in the Pueblo religion. It is a generic term, as there are a number of these figures in the ritual practice of the Pueblo people. Each has a unique role; belonging to separate kivas (secret societies or confraternities) and each has a name that differs from one mesa or pueblo to another.

== Roles ==
The clowns perform monthly rituals, summer (for rain), November - for the gods, for curing society, black magic. Among the Hopi/Tewa there are four distinct clowns: the Koyi'msĭ (also called Ho'tomeli'pung, Tewa Ta'chûktĭ); Chüʳkü'wĭmkya; Pai'yakyamü or Koyala; and Pi'ptuyakyamü (or "arrivals").

In order for a clown to perform meaningful social commentary via humor, the clown's identity must usually be concealed. The sacred clowns of the Pueblo people, however, do not employ masks but rely on body paint and head dresses. Among the best known orders of the sacred Pueblo clown is the Chiffoneti (called Payakyamu in Hopi, Kʼohsaa in the Tewa language, Koshare among the Keres people, Tabösh at Jemez, New Mexico, and Newekwe by the Zuñi). These individuals present themselves with black and white horizontal stripes painted on their bodies and faces, paint black circles around the mouth and eyes, and part their hair in the center and bind it in two bunches which stand upright on each side of the head and are trimmed with corn husks. A form of the Pueblo clown called the Kosha is described as a sacred being which appears in religious dances and performs many roles within the ceremonial structure, often teaching through their actions.

The mudheads (called Koyemshi in Zuni, and Tatsuki in Hopi) are usually portrayed by pinkish clay coated bodies and matching cotton bag worn over the head.

Anthropologists, most notably Adolf Bandelier in his 1890 book, The Delight Makers, and Elsie Clews Parsons in her Pueblo Indian Religion, have extensively studied the meaning of the Pueblo clowns and clown society in general. Bandelier notes that the Tsuku were somewhat feared by the Hopi as the source of public criticism and censure of non-Hopi like behavior. Their function can help defuse community tensions by providing their own humorous interpretation of the tribe's popular culture, by reinforcing taboos, and by communicating traditions. A 1656 case of a young Hopi man impersonating the resident Franciscan priest at Awat'ovi is thought to be a historic instance of Pueblo clowning.

== See also ==
- Heyoka
