= Ridiculous =

Deserving of ridicule, absurd

To be ridiculous is to be something highly incongruous or inferior, sometimes deliberately so to make people laugh or get their attention, and sometimes unintendedly so as to be considered laughable and earn or provoke ridicule and derision. It comes from the 1540s Latin "ridiculosus" meaning "laughable", from "ridiculus" meaning "that which excites laughter", and from "ridere" meaning "to laugh". "Ridiculous" is an adjective describing "the ridiculous".

In common usage, "ridiculousness" is used as a synonym for absurdity or nonsense. From a historical and technical viewpoint, "absurdity" is associated with argumentation and reasoning, "nonsense" with semantics and meaning, while "ridiculous" is most associated with laughter, superiority, deformity, and incongruity. Reductio ad absurdum is a valid method of argument, while reductio ad ridiculum is invalid. Argument by invective declaration of ridiculous is invalid, while arguments involving declarations of nonsense may summarize a cogent semantic problem with lack or meaning or ambiguity.

Historically, the ridiculous was central to initial theories of humor and laughter as first put forth by philosopher Thomas Hobbes. It is currently used in the theory of humor to trigger laughter, shock, parody, or satire. Reactions to the ridiculous have been studied in psychology for its effects on memory, attention, and attitude in social hierarchies. These studies have been applied to the theory of advertisement regarding attention, memory, and alleviation of preexisting negative attitudes toward products. The ridiculous is often contrasted with the sublime, one of extreme inferiority, the other of extreme superiority, and often one can suddenly move from one extreme state to the other.

== Humor ==
=== History: Incongruity, the superiority theory of humor, and deformity ===
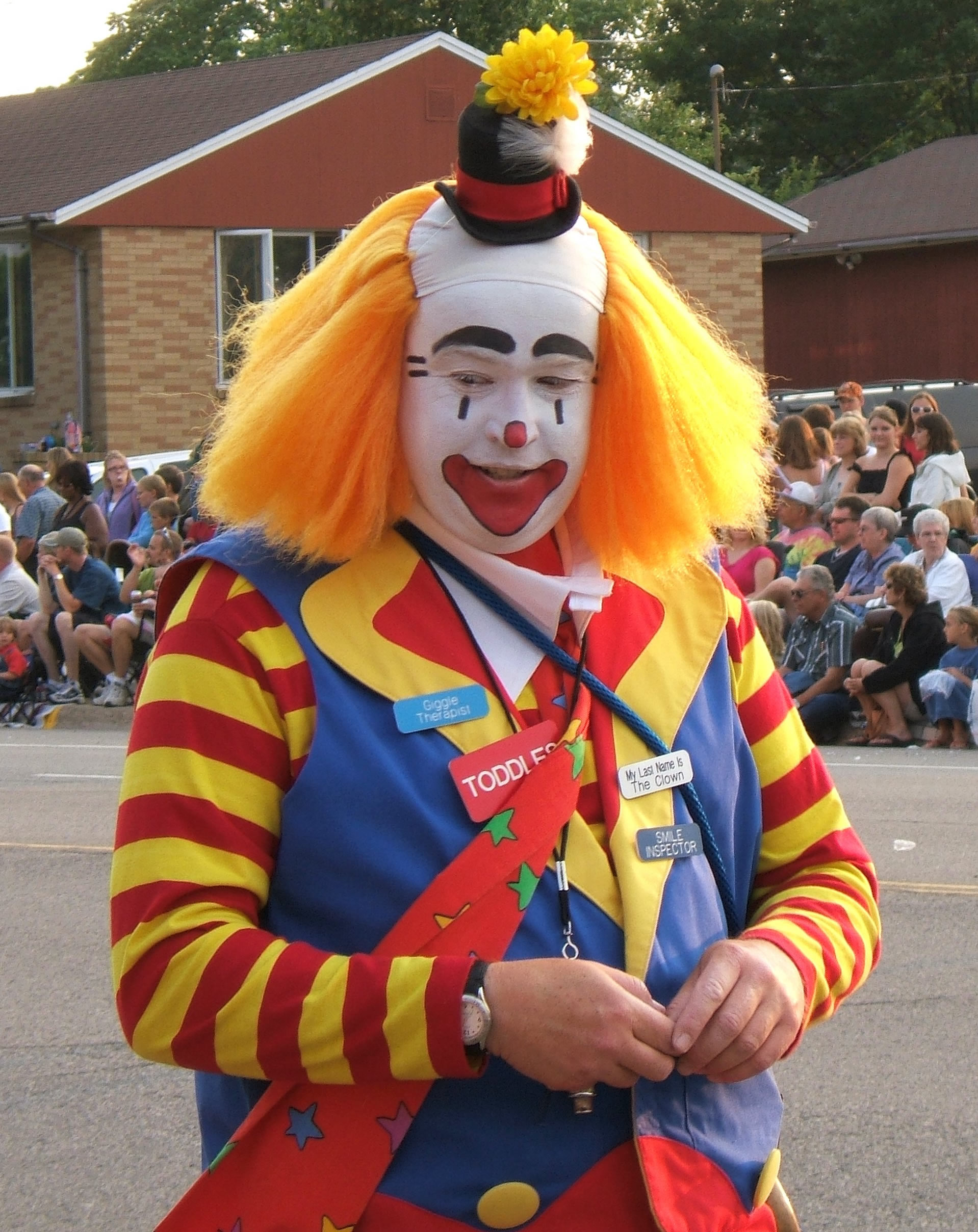
A clown wearing a hat of a ridiculously small and incongruous size

The ridiculous often has extreme incongruity (things that are not thought to belong next to each other) or inferiority, e.g., "when something that was dignified is reduced to a ridiculous position (here noting the element of the incongruous), so that laughter is most intense when we escape from a 'coerced solemnity'." For Aristotle, we laugh at inferior or ugly individuals, because we feel a joy at being superior to them. Socrates was reported by Plato as saying that the ridiculous was characterized by a display of self-ignorance. Deformity was considered by some to be essential to the ridiculous. Psychological theories of humor include the "incongruity theory" and the "superiority theory", the latter of which the philosopher Thomas Hobbes was an early proponent. Hobbes claimed that laughter was either caused spontaneously, or by seeing a deformed thing to which one compares themselves and laugh as a form of self applause; "a sudden glory arising from sudden conception of some eminency in ourselves, by comparison of the infirmities of others." The Right Reverend William Warburton, Lord Bishop of Gloucester said in the early 18th century that, "Nothing is ridiculous but what is deformed". Using the ridiculous is a method in the theory of humor.

Although common usage now considers "absurdity" to be synonymous with "ridiculousness", Hobbes discussed the two concepts as different, in that absurdity is viewed as having to do with invalid reasoning, as in Hobbes' Table of Absurdity, while ridiculousness has to do with laughter, superiority, ridicule, and deformity.

=== Native American Ritual Clown ===
The ritual clown (heyókȟa) in some Native American culture uses the painfully ridiculous, and is believed to become closer to the gods by its primordiality. Native American clowns are ridiculous in their contrary and rule breaking antics. In the film Little Big Man, the sacred clown rides sitting backwards on his horse, "washes" himself with dirt and "dries" himself with water. Heyókȟa are thought of as being incongruously backwards-forwards, upside-down, or contrary in nature. This spirit is often manifest by doing things backwards or unconventionally—riding a horse backwards, wearing clothes inside-out, or speaking backwards. For example, if food were scarce, a Heyókȟa would sit around and complain about how full he was; during a baking hot heat wave, a Heyókȟa would shiver with cold and put on gloves and cover himself with a thick blanket. Similarly, when it is 40 degrees below freezing he will wander around naked for hours complaining that it is too hot.

==== Parody and satire in social commentary ====
The ridiculous can use uses both physical and conceptual inferiority and incongruity of juxtaposition to create parody and satire.

In Candide, Voltaire parodies Leibniz's argument for the existence of evil under a benign God using "ridiculous rationalizations of evil". Leibniz claimed that God is constrained by logic, and created the best of all possible worlds. After being reduced from a "dignified" state to its opposite, the optimistic Dr. Pangloss (representing Leibniz) finds cause to consider his undignified position to be the best of all possible worlds, noting his own particular current happiness, which he argues could not have been attained without experiencing the atrocities in the previous narrative; his optimistic attitude is extremely incongruous with his experiences and extremely inferior undignified ultimate condition.

In Stanley Kubrick's 2001: A Space Odyssey, apelike humans and their behavior are juxtaposed next to streamlined advanced technology with a highly avant garde score by composer György Ligeti; Ligeti also used ridiculous juxtaposition in his scores to create parody, and this tool was frequently used by composer Peter Maxwell Davies.

=== Deformity and incongruity in performance as social commentary, and lifestyle ===
==== Japanese Butoh dance ====
Japanese Butoh uses both incongruity and deformity to create ridiculous dance performance and lifestyle; extreme movement methods that are highly incongruous with natural body movement in its dance and everyday lifestyle, as well as in its clothing, actions, costume and set design that is highly incongruous with societal norms, which often shock the audience or visitor, and are sometimes considered not only ridiculous, but incongruently "bizarre and beautiful" or "elegant and grotesque".

==== Theatre of the Ridiculous ====
The Theatre of the Ridiculous is a genre of performance that uses highly incongruous stage settings and incongruous costumes such as cross dressing to disturb or create shock in the audience. It began in New York City in the 1960s.

== Psychology: attention, memory, and attitudes ==
Psychologists have studied human response to the ridiculous and its effects on attention and memory.

=== Advertising ===
The ridiculous is used in advertising to manipulate attention and attitudes toward products.

== Juxtaposition with the sublime ==
The ridiculous is sometimes contrasted to the sublime where something with one quality is thought of as approaching, or likely to change to, the other.

Thomas Paine, writing in The Age of Reason in 1795, said The sublime and the ridiculous are often so nearly related, that it is difficult to class them separately. One step above the sublime, makes the ridiculous; and one step above the ridiculous, makes the sublime again.

Napoleon, reflecting on the state of his existence following his retreat from Moscow in 1812, famously remarked to Polish ambassador D. G. De Pradt: Du sublime au ridicule il n'y a qu'un pas (There is only one step from the sublime to the ridiculous).

=== Reduction to the ridiculous, or "reductio ad ridiculum" ===
Reduction to the ridiculous (Latin: "reductio ad ridiculum", also called "Appeal to ridicule", "appeal to mockery", or "the Horse Laugh") is a logical fallacy which presents the opponent's argument in a way that grossly misrepresents it and appears ridiculous next to it, often so misrepresentative as to create a straw man argument, rather than addressing the argument itself. For example, in arguing against idealism, with its sophisticated arguments that the world was not real but only existed in the mind, philosopher Dr. Johnson famously kicked a stone.

Contrasting ridiculousness with absurdity in reasoning, Reductio ad ridiculum is an invalid method of argument, while reductio ad absurdum is a valid method.

=== Invective ===
Arguments are often simply dismissed by calling them "ridiculous" as invective, without further argumentation. Philosopher Friedrich Nietzsche often dismissed philosophical positions by calling them "ridiculous" without further argument given.

== See also ==
- Camp (style)
- Illogical
- Kitsch
- Non sequitur (logic)
- Silly
