= Clowns of America International =

Logo of Clowns of America International

Clowns of America International Inc. (COAI) is a Minnesota-based nonprofit clown arts membership organization which aims to share, educate and act as a gathering place for amateurs, semi-professionals, and professional clowns. It provides its members with the resources needed to refine and develop their characters. The COAI follows a strict code of ethics, known as the "Eight Clown Commandments". In addition to the co-operative nature of the group and its annual conventions, it also provides several scholarship opportunities to young men and women.

== History ==
COAI, formerly Clowns of America, was established in its current form in 1984. Clowns of America ran into financial difficulties in the early 1980s. This resulted in its dissolution and the formation of COAI and the World Clown Association.

It has various alleyways and local clown clubs that serve as meeting spots for members. According to the COAI bylaws, a clown alley is any club with at least five members that forms a local chapter.

The COAI also publishes The New Calliope, a bimonthly journal that contains information about the group, news, events, and clown-related articles.

The number of clowns in the United States has significantly decreased in the past decade. This decline is due to older clowns retiring and difficulties in attracting younger generations to the profession.

== Affiliates ==
- Mid Atlantic Clown Association
- Mid West Clown Association
- Southeast Clown Association
- Texas Clown Association
- Pennsylvania East Clown Company Association

== See also ==
- Clown society
