= Booger dance =

Traditional Cherokee Dance

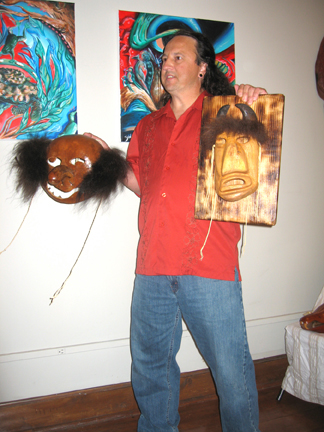
Roger Cain (United Keetoowah Band mask-maker) showing a gourd booger mask (left) and a buffalo mask (right)

The booger dance (Cherokee: ᏭᏂᎦᏚᎵ, romanized: tsu'nigadu'li, lit. 'many persons' faces covered over') is a traditional dance of the Cherokee tribe, performed with ritual masks. It is performed at night-time around a campfire, usually in late fall or winter.

Before the dance begins, the male Cherokee performers, known as "boogers" (bogeymen), discreetly leave the party, don booger masks, and return for the dance in the guise of evil spirits. They act in a stereotypically lewd manner by chasing the women around, grabbing them if possible, to satirize and ridicule what is seen as the non-Cherokee's predatory lust for the Cherokee. The dance and accompanying music are traditionally believed to drive away or offer protection against inimical spirits, and those in whom they dwell, striking fear into their hearts, while providing comedic relief for the tribal members.

The masks could be fashioned from gourds, animal skins, or buckeye wood. The dance has also been the subject of much scholarship.

According to historians, the booger dance was practiced by the Cherokee people up until the 20th century when it was abandoned until recently resurrected.

== See also ==
- Will West Long, noted booger dance mask maker and cultural historian
