= Heyoka =

Type of sacred clown in the culture of the Sioux peoples

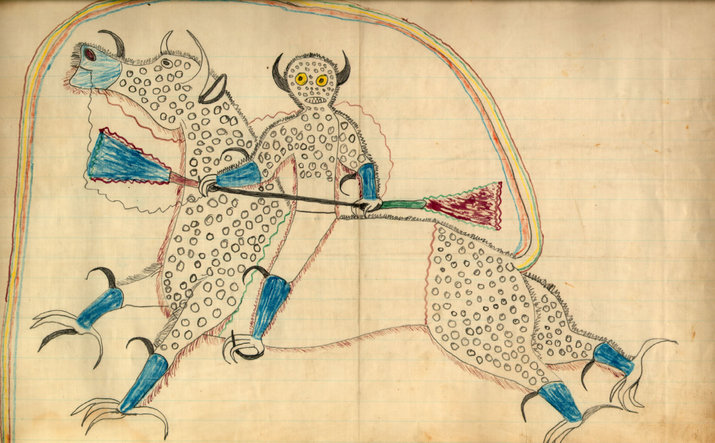
Ledger artwork by Lakota artist Black Hawk representing a dream of a thunder being. c. 1880

The heyoka (heyókȟa, also spelled "haokah," "heyokha") is a type of sacred clown shaman in the culture of the Sioux (Lakota and Dakota people) of the Great Plains of North America. The heyoka is a contrarian, jester, and satirist, who speaks, moves and reacts in an opposite fashion to the people around them.

Only those having visions of the thunder beings of the west, the Wakíŋyaŋ, and who are recognized as such by the community, can take on the ceremonial role of the heyoka.

== Social role ==
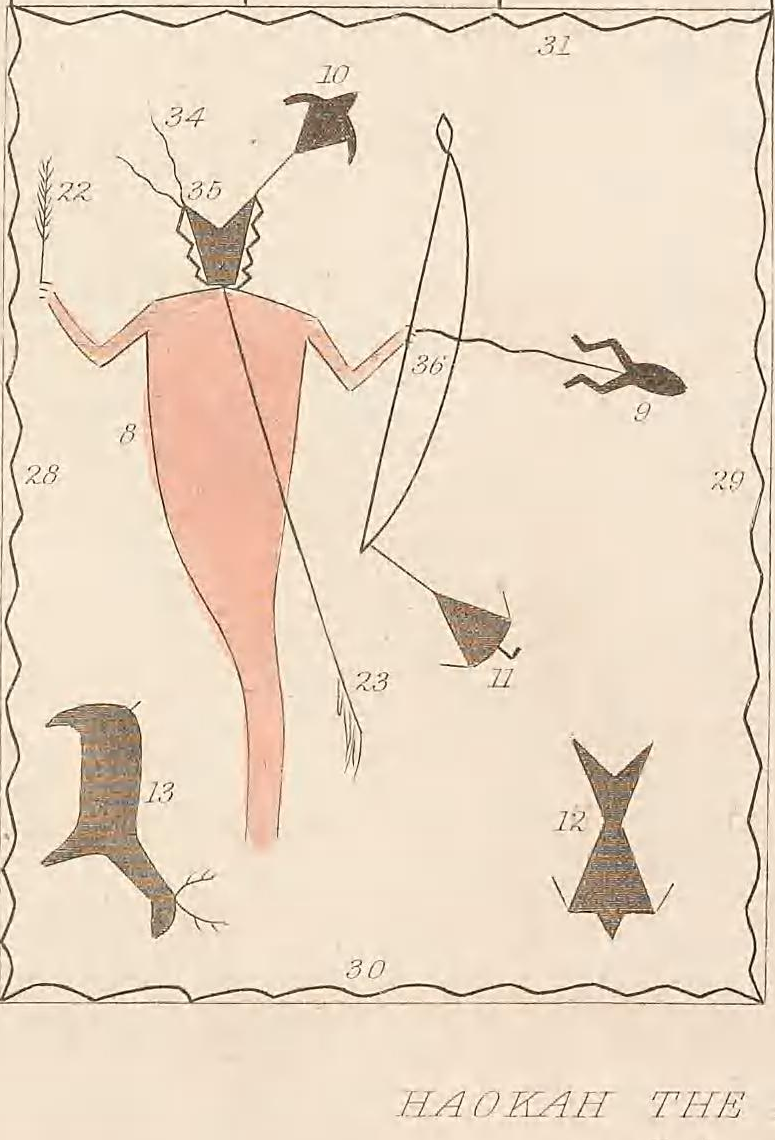
Haöka, the Anti-Nature God of the Dakotas (detail). —Drawn by Capt. S. Eastman, U.S. Army

The Heyókȟa is thought of as being in charge of above and below, or are more in charge of the dead, instead of the living. This manifests by their not always doing everything like the others. For example, if food is scarce, a heyókȟa may sit around and complain about how full he is; during a baking hot heat wave, a heyókȟa might shiver with cold and put on gloves and cover himself with a thick blanket. Similarly, when it is freezing he might wander around naked, complaining that it is too hot. A unique example is the famous heyókȟa sacred clown called "the Straighten-Outer":

He was always running around with a hammer trying to flatten round and curvy things (soup bowls, eggs, wagon wheels, etc.), thus making them straight.

— John Fire Lame Deer

The heyókȟa symbolizes and portrays many aspects of the sacred beings, the Wakíŋyaŋ. His satire presents important questions by fooling around. They ask difficult questions, and say things others are too afraid to say. Their behavior poses questions, as do Zen koans. By reading between the lines, the audience is able to think about things not usually thought about, or to look at things differently.

Principally, the heyókȟa functions as a mirror and a teacher, using extreme behaviors to mirror others, and forcing them to examine their own doubts, fears, hatreds, and weaknesses. Heyókȟa have the power to heal emotional pain; such power comes from the experience of shame—they sing of shameful events in their lives, beg for food, and live as clowns. They provoke laughter in distressing situations of despair, and provoke fear and chaos when people feel complacent and overly secure, to keep them from taking themselves too seriously or believing they are more powerful than they are.

In addition, sacred clowns serve an important role in shaping tribal codes. Unbound by societal constraints, heyókȟa are able to violate cultural taboos freely and thus critique established customs. By questioning these norms and taboos, they help to define the accepted boundaries, rules, and societal guidelines for ethical and moral behavior. They are the only ones who can ask "Why?" about sensitive topics; they use satire to question the specialists and carriers of sacred knowledge or those in positions of power and authority.

For people who are as poor as us, who have lost everything, who had to endure so much death and sadness, laughter is a precious gift. When we were dying like flies from white man's disease, when we were driven into reservations, when the government rations did not arrive and we were starving, watching the pranks and capers of Heyókȟa were a blessing.

— John Fire Lame Deer

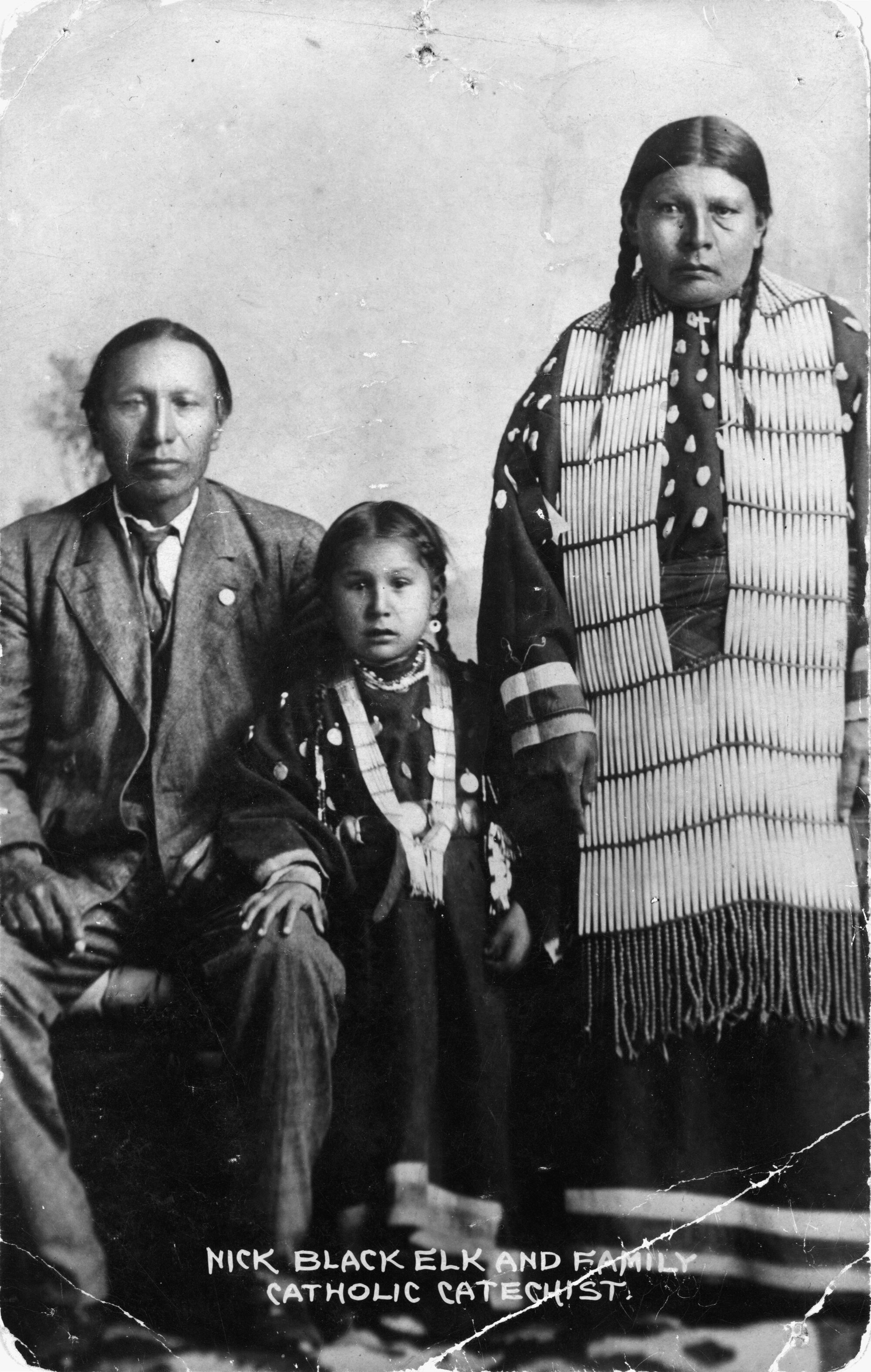
Black Elk (left), an Oglala heyoka.

== Individual examples ==
The Lakota medicine man Black Elk described himself as a heyoka, saying he had been visited as a child by the thunder beings. A survivor of the Wounded Knee Massacre, Black Elk toured with Buffalo Bill's Wild West in Europe and discussed his religious views, visions, and events in a series of interviews with poet John Neihardt, collected in 1932 book Black Elk Speaks.

== Vision of thunder beings ==
Only those who have had visions of the thunder beings of the west can act as heyokas. They have sacred power and they share some of this with all the people, but they do it through funny actions. When a vision comes from the thunder beings of the West, it comes with terror like a thunder storm; but when the storm of vision has passed, the world is greener and happier; for wherever the truth of vision comes upon the world, it is like a rain. The world, you see, is happier after the terror of the storm.

— Black Elk

In Lakota mythology, Heyókȟa is also a spirit of thunder and lightning. He is said to use the wind as sticks to beat the drum of thunder. His emotions are portrayed opposite the norm; he laughs when he is sad and cries when he is happy, cold makes him sweat and heat makes him shiver. In art, he is depicted as having two horns, which marks him as a hunting spirit. In some visions, he also appeared as a snow bird, a swallow, a horse, a dog, a night hawk, a frog, or a dragonfly.

== In popular culture ==
Chicago Bulls coach Phil Jackson was known for characterizing controversial player Dennis Rodman as a "heyoka". It was mentioned in The Last Dance.

== See also ==
- Avadhuta, a type of Hindu mystic or saint who acts without consideration for standard social etiquette
- Clown society, an organization of comedic entertainers
- Divine madness
- Foolishness for Christ, Christian figures who use shocking and unconventional behavior
- Nyönpa, Tibetan Buddhist yogis who act in unconventional ways
- Pueblo clown
- Trickster

== Bibliography ==
- Wilson D. Wallis. Heyoka: Rites of Reversal. Lakota Books, 1996 reprint.
