= World Festival of Clowns in Yekaterinburg =

The World Festival of Clowns in Yekaterinburg is an annual festival of the world clownery, taking place in Yekaterinburg, Russia, since 2008. The organizers of this festival are People's artist of Russia Anatoly Marchevsky and People's artist of Russia Alexander Kalmykov.

== About ==
The festival is dedicated to:

- cultural tolerance: participants from all over the world take part in this event: Germany, France, Italy, Spain, the US, China, Ukraine, Peru, Belarus, the Netherlands, Russia, Hungary, Denmark, Switzerland, Brazil, Belgium, Israel, Canada, etc.
- development of international relationships in the sphere of culture and arts;
- in memory of the clown, mime, writer and the creator of a new clown character "sad clown", People's Artist of Armenian SSR - Leonid Yenghibarov.

== Organising committee ==
The World Festival of Clowns is organized by Honoured Artist of Russia Boris Vazhenin, People's artist of Russia Anatoly Marchevsky and People's artist of Russia Alexander Kalmykov.

== Periodicity ==
The World Festival of Clowns is an annual event that has been taking its place since 2008.

Festival name	Year	Days	Participants
The 1st World Festival of Clowns in Yekaterinburg	2008	April, 5-9	David Larible, David Shiner, Monty Clowns, Olivier Takwin and Olivier Deshavu, Sergey Prosvirnin and Sergey Yeroshenkov, Clown ˈBoˈ - Boris Oskotsky, Clowns Mick and Muck, Ruslan Marchevsky, acrobats ˈBrave Firefightersˈ etc.
The 2nd World Festival of Clowns in Yekaterinburg	2009	November, 19-22	Peter Shub, Housh-ma-Housh, Scott & Muriel, Los Rivelinos, Nikolai Yashukov, Nikolay Yermakov, Alexandra & Gavriil Sedovs, Adrey Dementyev-Kornilov etc.
The 3rd World Festival of Clowns in Yekaterinburg, in memory of Leonid Yenghibarov	2010	November, 25-28	Comic group Starbugs, Comic acrobats duo Los Manducas, Galina & Sonny Hayes, Clown May - People's artist of Russia Yevgeniy Maykhrovsky, Armen Asiryants, Clown Kharry - Igor Yashnikov, Anna Oprea - Human Slinky, Theatre Circus Ale Hop etc.
The 4th World Festival of Clowns in Yekaterinburg in memory of Yury Nikulin	2011	November, 25-28	Rob Torres, Zementovs, BonBon & Tina, Willer Nikolodi, Ildar Muhametzhanov & Ruslan Marchevsky, Davis Vassalo, Mayorovs etc.
The 5th World Festival of Clowns in Yekaterinburg	2012	November, 22-25	Housh-ma-Housh, Clown Henry (Brazil), Clown Barto, Le Rossyanns, Mik & Mak, Willer Nikolodi, Sergey+Sergey Prosvirnins, Daniel (Isrsael) etc.
The 6th World Festival of Clowns in Yekaterinburg	2013	November, 14-17	Bello Nock, Clown Francesco, Paul Morocco & Ole, Rob Lok, Lieutenanant Schmidt's Grandchildren, Los Revelinos, Jolly Roger
The 7th World Festival of Clowns in Yekaterinburg	2014	November, 27-30	Andre Astor & Oscar, Cesar Aedo, David Larible, Equivokee, Furmanov brothers, Kai, Rivelinos
The 8th World Festival of Clowns in Yekaterinburg	2015	November, 26-29	Davis Vassalo, Valentin Urse, Rulo, Popeyto, Willer Nicolodi, Daniel Zafrani, Boris Nikishkin, Pavel Boyarinov
The 9th World Festival of Clowns in Yekaterinburg	2016	November, 24-27	Vik & Fabrini, Henry, Rob Torres, BonBon & Tina, Duet ˈLess Russianˈ, Juma, Boris Oskotsky, Trio ˈWithout Socksˈ, Boris Nikishkin
The 10th World Festival of Clowns in Yekaterinburg	2017	November, 23-26	Bello Nock, Bella & Alex Sher, Housh-ma-Housh, Rivellino, Bartok, Alexey Bobylev, Mick & Mack, Clown Kharry - Igor Yashnikov

== Gallery ==
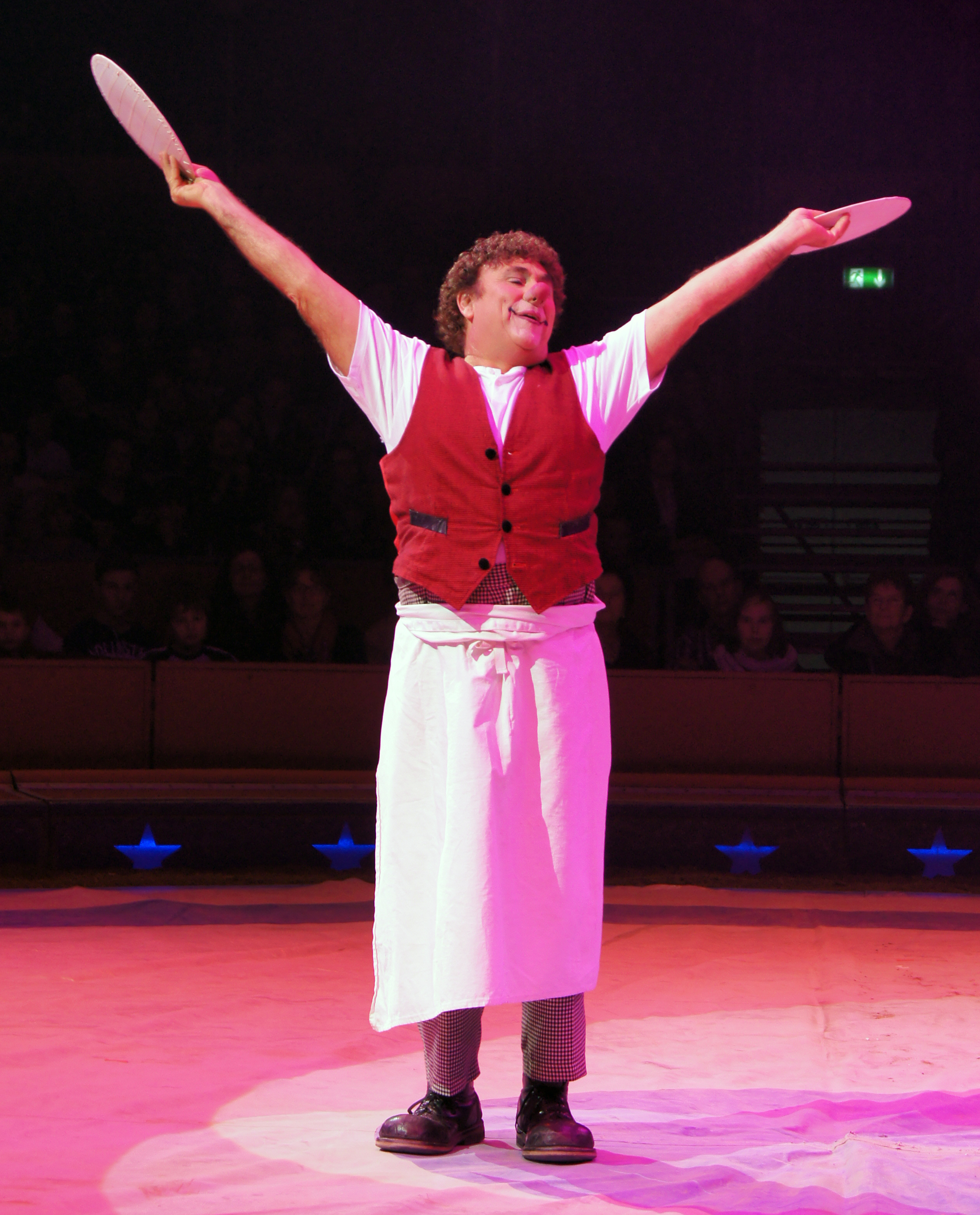
David Larible
(Italy)

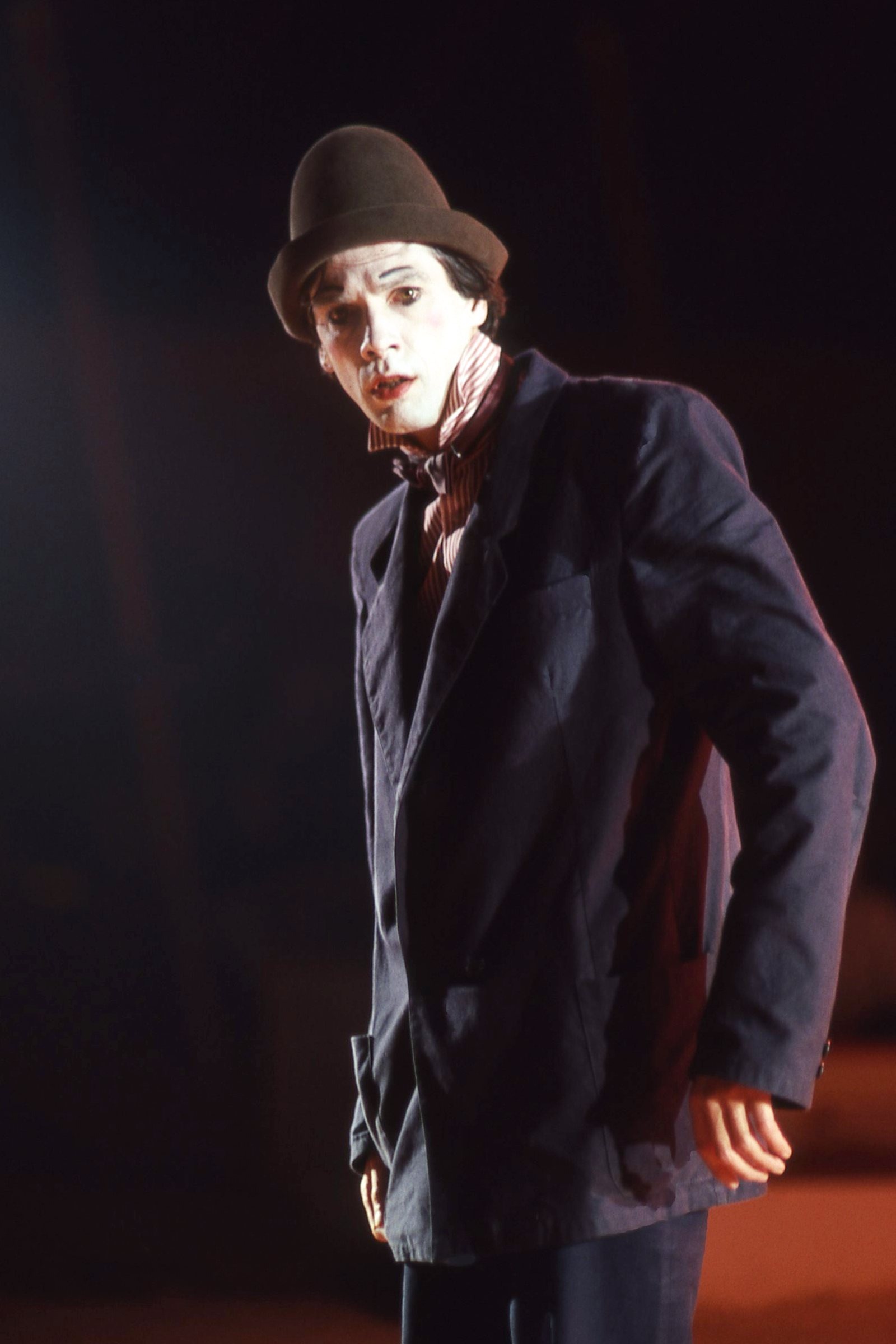
David Shiner
(the USA)

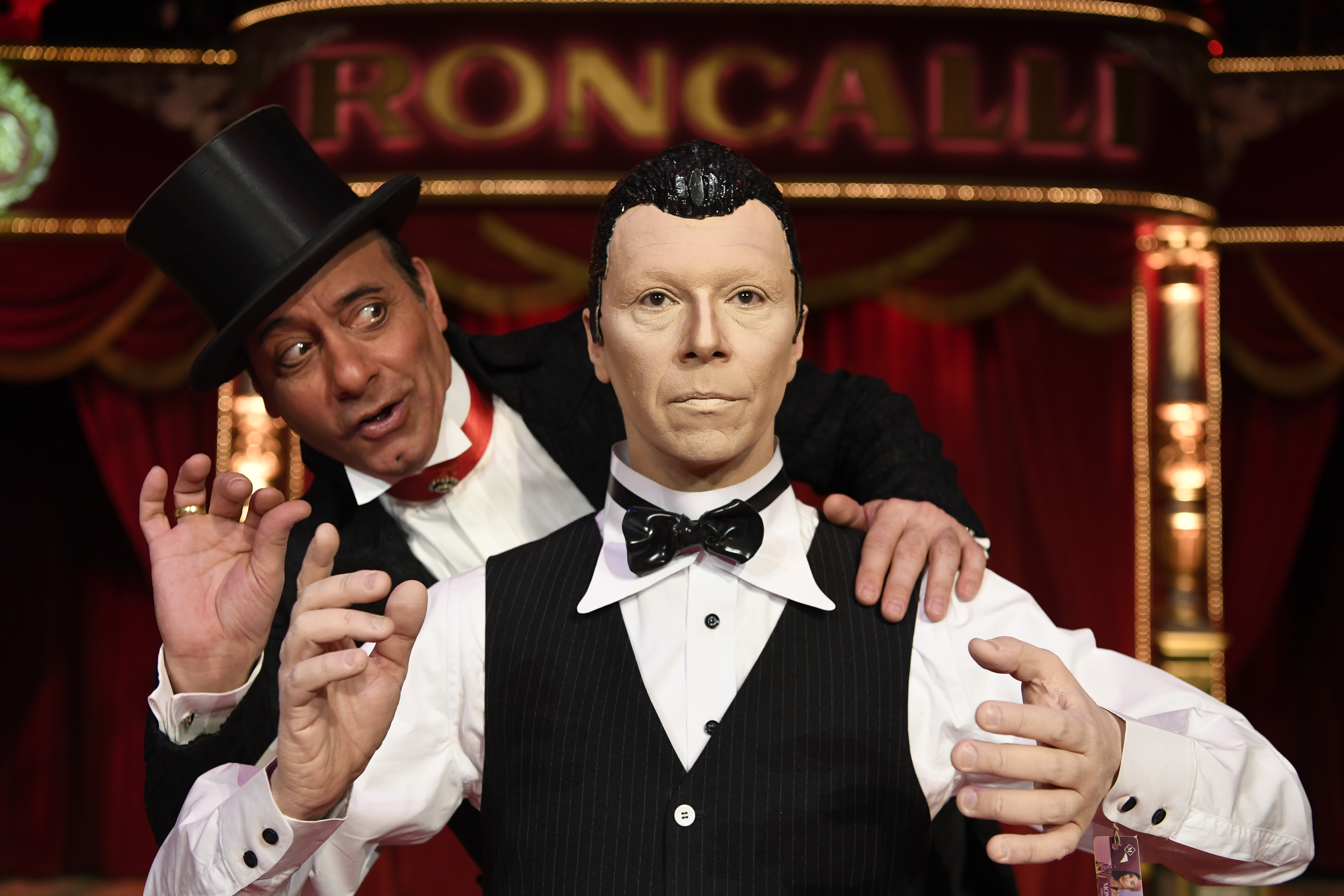
Vik & Fabrini
(Brazil)

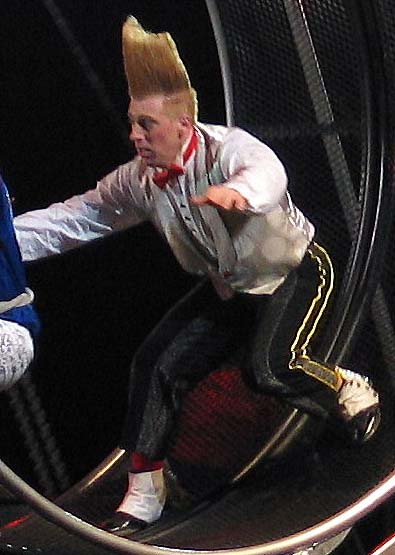
Bello Nock
(the USA)

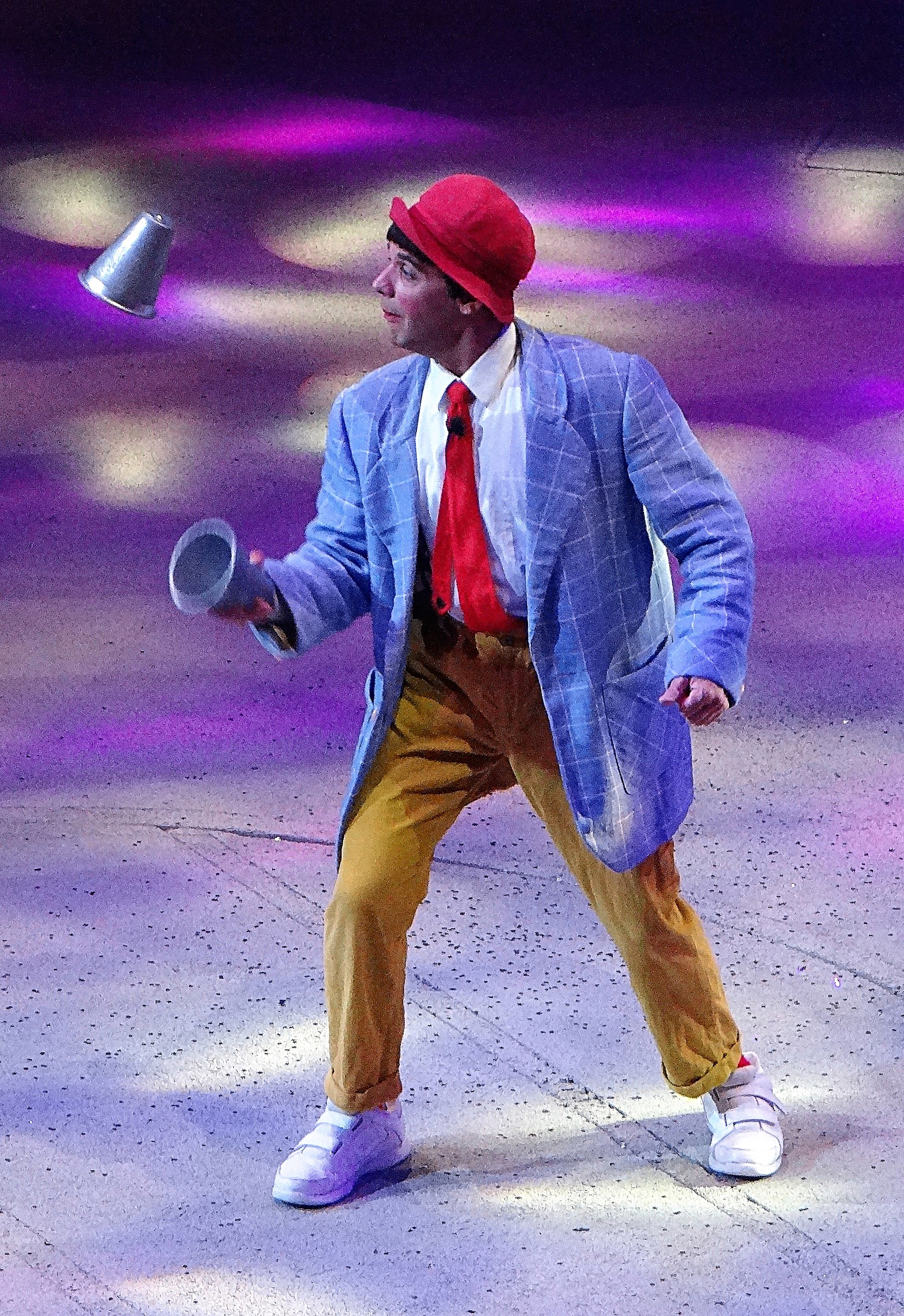
Rob Torres
(the USA)

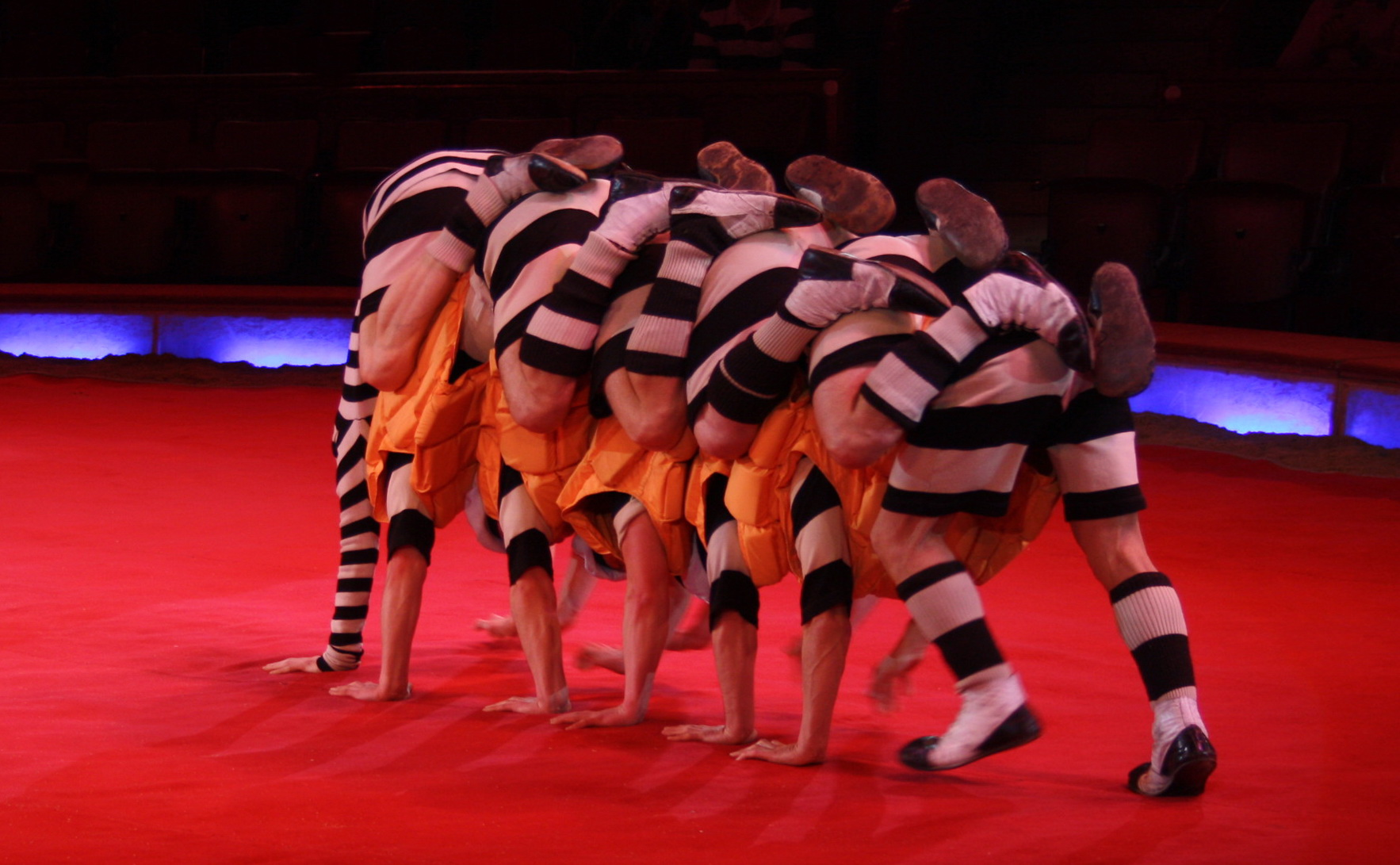
Mayorovs
(Belarus, Russia, Ukraine)

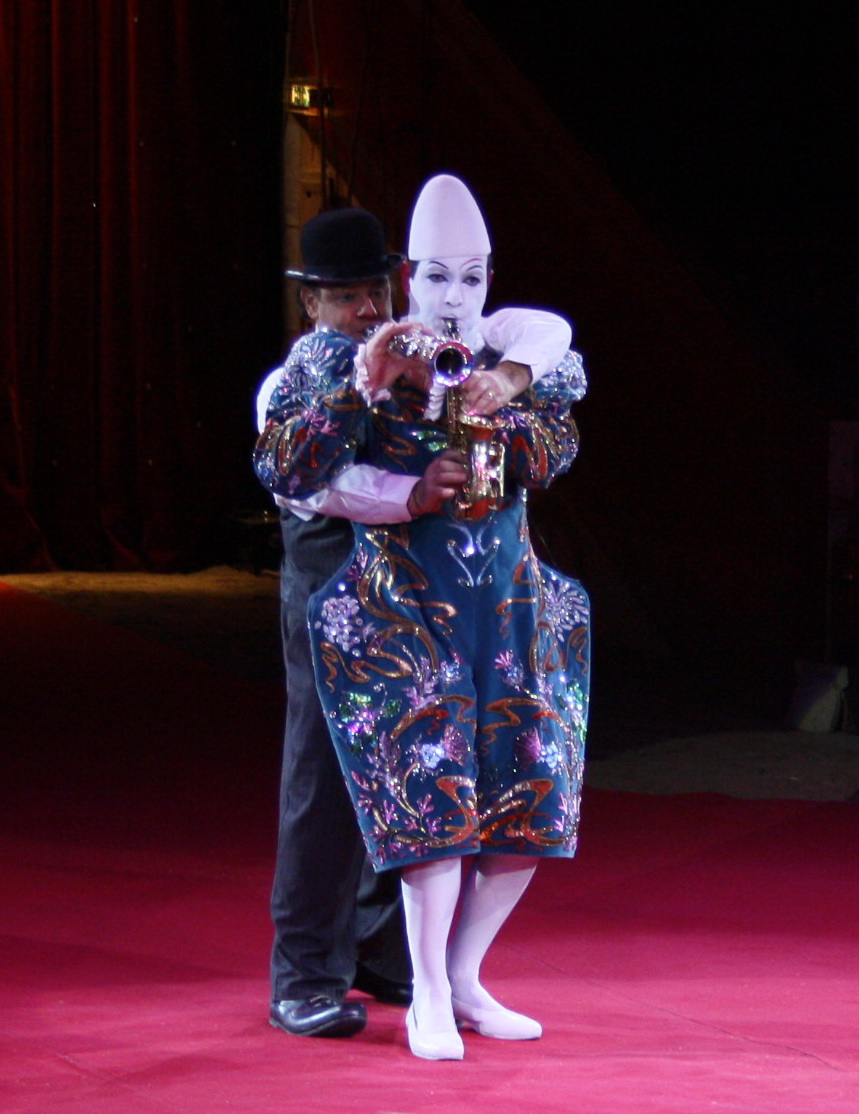
Duet ˈLess Russianˈ (France)

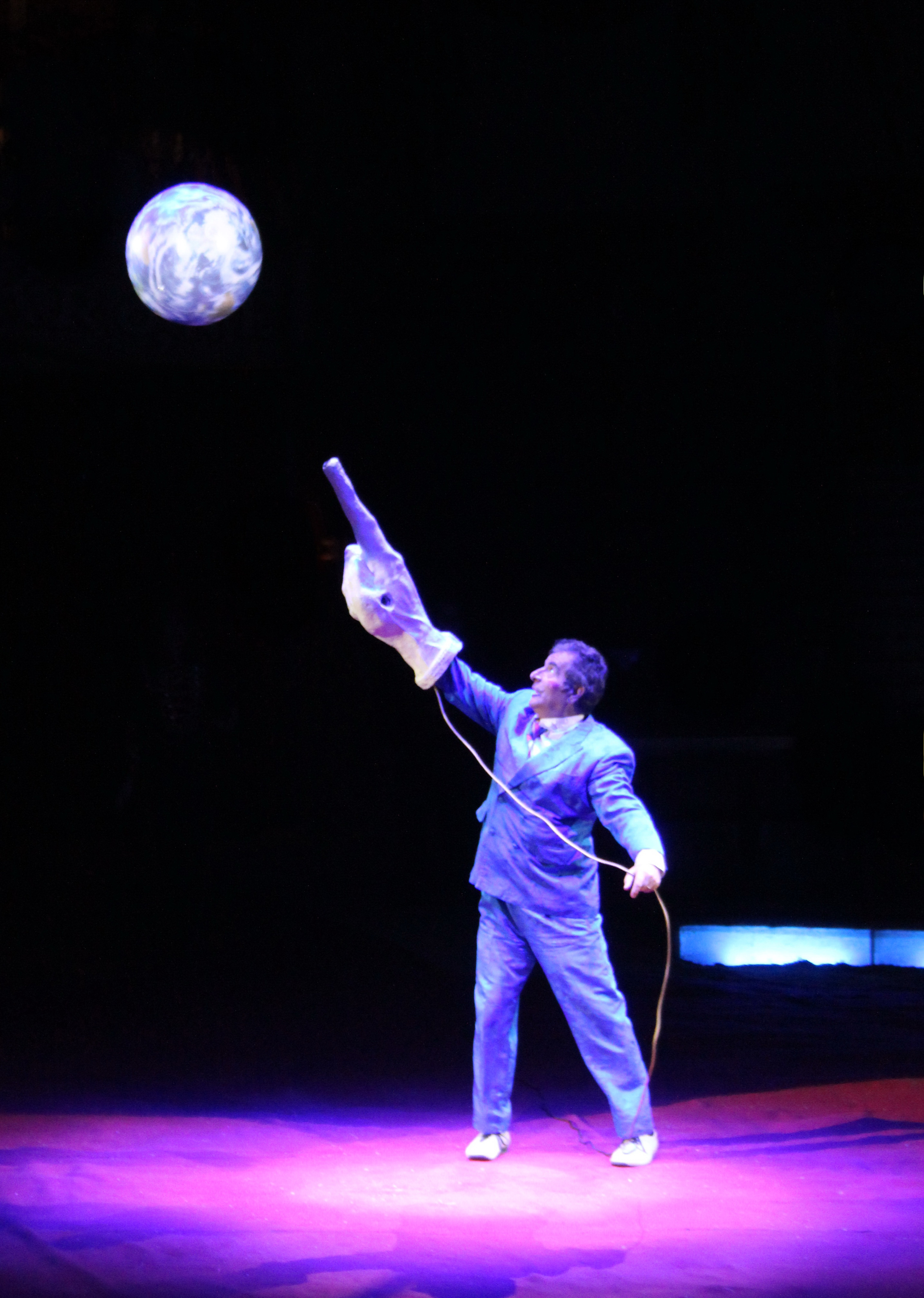
Francesco (France)
