= Raffaele De Ritis =

Italian theatre director and historian

- Born: 1967 (age 57–58); Pescara, Italy
- Occupation: artistic director

Raffaele De Ritis (born 1967) is an Italian theatre director. He is known for having created and directed numerous circus productions that have been seen worldwide through his association with Cirque du Soleil, Big Apple Circus, Ringling Bros. and Barnum & Bailey, and Franco Dragone, among others, He wrote and directed Barnum's Kaleidoscape for Feld Entertainment (1999), one of first one-ring under-canvas "boutique circuses" that toured the United States, and was the writer/director of two shows for Big Apple Circus (2002 and 2003). For Cirque du Soleil, he co-wrote the original circus dinner show concept "Pomp, Duck and Circumstance" (1997), at the origins of the "spiegeltent" immersive cabaret format. Other directing credits include: Monte Carlo Magic Stars (1998–99); Wiesbaden Youth Circus Festival (1998); Tournai New Circus Festival (2003, Belgium); and associate director for the first Moscow Circus Festival (1996) and variety shows in Italy. He also directed Italian clown David Larible's theatre show concept.

He is the former chief editor of "Circo" magazine; co-curator of Circopedia project; founder of Funambolika festival, Pescara (Italy); and has been a Circus Consultant for RAI TV (Italy). He held a seat on the Commission for Circus Arts, Ministry of Culture, Italy and was president of Teatro D'Annunzio in Pescara, one of Italy's oldest theatrical institutions.

He curator of exhibitions, lecturer in universities, teacher in direction and clowning. De Ritis earned his degree in cinema at the State University in Rome (Italy), and has an extensive private collection of circus-related books, posters, programs, engravings and archival videos.

Among his published books, major work is “Storia del Circo” (2008, Rome), reviewed as "the most complete and innovating book internationally existing on the circus" and "a main reference work in the circus historiography of XXIth century"
