= Vladimir Doveyko Jr. =

Russian circus artist and director (born 1951)

Vladimir Vladimirovich Doveyko Jr.
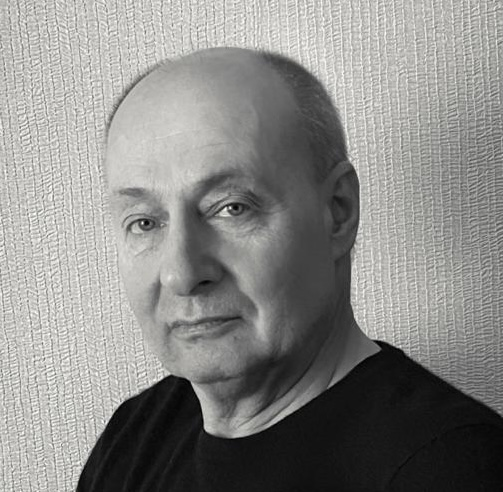
- Born: February 27, 1951 (age 74); Moscow, USSR
- Occupation(s): Circus artist, acrobat, director
- Years active: since 1965

Vladimir Vladimirovich Doveyko Jr. (Russian: Владимир Владимирович Довейко (младший); born February 27, 1951, Moscow) is a Soviet and Russian circus artist, acrobat, director. He was awarded the People's Artist of the Russian Federation in 2000.

== Biography ==
Doveyko was born February 27, 1951, in Moscow to Vladimir Vladimirovich and Lidia Vasilievna Doveyko, circus artists. In 1975, he graduated from GITIS.

From 1965 to 1979, he was participating as an artist in his father's circus act, he was performing stunts from a flip board on one stilt. In 1980, for the "Carnival is walking around the world" collective he created a circus act - Acrobatic ensemble "Rus".

Since 1982, he acted as the “White Clown” in the group of V. Morozovsky, from 1983 to 1985 – he was participating in the clown duet with the “Redheads” (partners V. Masyutin, I. Robey). In 1987, as a director, he prepared new repertoire with the “Shelkovnikovs Trio” clowns, in 1988 – he was working with the clown duet of S. Panov and V. Novikov, in 1991 - he created the circus acts “Eccentric Trio”, “Mean Clowns”.

In 1991, he invented a special mini-springboard for swings ("Doveyko's swings"), that allows acrobats to fly up to the height of an air flight, thereby the Russian Swings attraction appeared.

In 1992, he received the title of Merited Artist of the Russian Federation, and in 2000 – People's Artist of the Russian Federation.

In 2012, he introduced the Millenium – a new attraction of an air flight.

== Family ==
First wife – Irina Sergeevna Doveyko (b. 1951), a circus artist since 1967.

In 2004, he married a second time. Wife – Veronika Alekseevna Rusanovskaya. April 4, 2005 they had a daughter, Polina.

== Awards ==
- Silver Clown International Circus Festival of Monte-Carlo (1994)
