= Elvin Bale =

British stuntman

Elvin Bale (born 1945 in London, England) is a former circus performer and daredevil with Ringling Bros. and Barnum & Bailey Circus, among many other international circuses. He performed a single trapeze act which finished with a heel catch. Among his other acts were the "wheel of death", "human space shuttle", "mechanical monster", "motorcycle on the high wire" and human cannonball. His career as a performer ended on January 8, 1987, when, performing the human cannonball, he over-shot his landing cushion, breaking his legs and back and paralyzing him from the waist down.

Ringling Bros. billed him as the "World's Greatest Daredevil."

== Early life ==
Elvin Trevor Bale was born to Irene and Edwin Trevor (Tommy) Bale. Bale was among the fourth generation of Bales in the circus industry, an entertainment dynasty who, in addition to the circus, performed in music hall (vaudeville) using various stage names. After an early childhood touring with European circuses, Bale and his family moved to the United States in the 1950s when his father took a job as a tiger trainer with Ringling Bros. and Barnum & Bailey Circus.

As a youngster, Bale worked as a clown, a dancing boy, a cage boy for his father's tiger act, and an acrobat in the family’s bicycle act. His twin sister, Dawnita; older sister, Gloria; and younger sister, Bonnie, also worked in a variety of family acts in various shows. In the 1960s Bale began working on what would become his signature act, the single trapeze with a “heel catch” finish. Bale's father appeared as a guest along with Ray Bolger on American game show ''What's My Line?''

== Life as a daredevil ==
In The American Circus, John Culhane calls Elvin Bale “the greatest circus daredevil of the second half of the twentieth century.” After working with Art Concello’s American Circus in Russia in 1968, Bale joined the Blue Unit of the Ringling Bros. and Barnum & Bailey Circus in 1969. He would headline the Blue Unit in the 70s and early 80s, and his single trapeze act won him the Circus Oscar at the 1973 Circus World Festival in Madrid, Spain, as well as the 1976 Gold Clown, given out by the International Circus Festival of Monte-Carlo for the best circus performance of the year. He ended his trapeze act by sitting on the trapeze, swinging it up to its highest point, then diving forward into space with a yell—with no net underneath—throwing his legs back just in time to catch the middle of the bar on the descent with his Achilles’ heels and swing back, hanging by his Achilles’ heels. Bale performed in the Vatican for Pope John Paul II, under helicopters in the French Alps, and at African soccer stadiums.

Bale was also known as "The Phantom of Balance" for his work on the "wheel of death". He mounted an 8-foot steel-mesh wheel on the end of a 38-foot steel arm suspended from the ceiling. As the arm spun around its axis, Bale would run around the outside of the wheel, sometimes blindfolded, sometimes with a man standing on his shoulders. He won the Silver Clown in 1979 for that act.

In addition, he performed a high-wire motorcycle act, standing on his hands as much as 150 feet above the floor of the arena while riding the motorcycle backwards down the wire. Besides circus arenas, he also performed the motorcycle act on a high wire strung over a 300-foot canyon at Black’s Beach near San Diego, California.

Bale's human cannonball act began with Ringling Bros. and Barnum & Bailey Circus in 1978 as the "Human Space Shuttle". He left Ringling Bros. in 1983 and toured as the featured performer with several European circuses. On January 8, 1987, while performing with Chipperfield Circus in Hong Kong, a miscalculation sent him over the air bag at the other end of the arena. Bale broke both legs and permanently injured his thoracic vertebrae, resulting in paralysis from the waist down.

== Life in circus administration ==
After recovering from his accident, Bale became a theatrical booking agent, and since the mid-1990s, he traveled and worked in management roles with Cole Bros. Circus. He served as their vice president of operations as well as booking and directing the show. In 2001, Bale was inducted into the International Circus Hall of Fame.
