= Barnum's Kaleidoscape =

Origin
- Country: United States
- Founder(s): Kenneth Feld
- Year founded: 1999

Information
- Fate: closed
- Director: Raffaele De Ritis
- Traveling show?: Yes
- Circus tent?: Yes

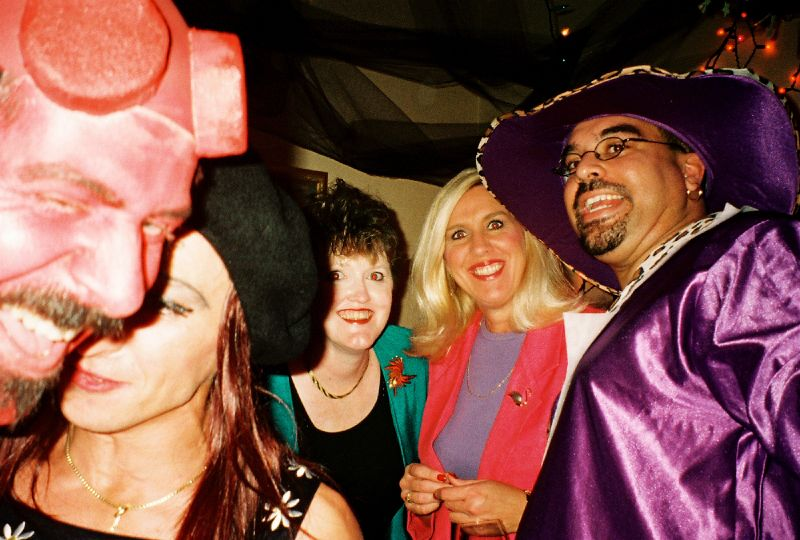
A Halloween party in the area

Barnum's Kaleidoscape was an American circus staged by Feld Entertainment, the owners of Ringling Bros. and Barnum & Bailey Circus, at a start-up cost of $10 million. It ran for one season, 1999–2000. Inspired by both European traditions and the contemporary circus movement, it was the first Ringling show to be held under a tent since 1956 and also its first one-ring presentation in more than a century. The tent was carpeted with wood flooring and amenities to create an intimate setting with seating for 1,800 on cushioned seats and sofas and no one further than 50 feet from the circus ring. Besides traditional circus fare like popcorn (sold from an old-fashioned circus wagon) upscale items such as cappuccino and veggie wraps were offered. The show consisted of 62 performers, 54 crew members, 8 horses and 27 geese, with 50 trucks involved in moving it from site to site.

== Show overview ==
The show had no ringmaster, instead having its star attraction clown David Larible (an auguste) and his foil Pipo (a whiteface) introduce acts and perform interludes between them. In the opening act, the entire cast helped a makeup-less Larible put on his costume and make-up, in the process assuming his clown persona. The only animal performers were the aforementioned horses and flock of geese plus a duck. The program had a full score composed by Linda Hudes and performed by a small orchestra. The show was directed by Raffaele De Ritis, an Italian circus and theater director who had previously worked with Cirque du Soleil and the Moscow State Circus. The costumes were designed by Pascal Jacob from France. The head rigger was Valery Panteleenko. The General Manager was Brian Liddicoat.

== Motivation for mounting ==
One purpose Feld had for the show was to expand into the new high-end markets pioneered by shows like Big Apple Circus and Cirque du Soleil. Kenneth Feld acknowledged to The New York Times, "...it's hard to say that we've ignored Cirque du Soleil. If a market is out there, we feel we should get more of our fair share."

Larible, who was among those who created the show, responded to questions about elements that seemed to bear a resemblance to Cirque du Soleil:

I think Cirque is beautiful and great, but everybody moves in the same way. Sometimes Cirque is a little mechanical, and if one guy hurts himself, they just put another guy in his place and nobody in the audience will ever notice the replacement. That's impossible in our show. Every character in the show is a major player. The show is full of surprises every night. We want spontaneity – that's what circus is all about, that feeling that what is happening now is happening for the first time.

Kenneth Feld dubbed it "a total entertainment immersion experience." Theater critic Clive Barnes stated "This is the kind of show for which God invented the circus."

In the industry many questioned whether the show would prove viable. Circus historian Greg Parkinson, a former executive director of the Circus World Museum, told The New York Times before the opening, "In a tent of this size they'll have to have a high percentage of sales to break even. And there will be competitors." Similarly, Big Apple Circus founder and artistic director Paul Binder told the Times, "the economics of a one-ring tent are tight and very nasty." Binder after seeing the show also described it as "extraordinary."

== Acts ==
The acts included:

- Sylvia Zerbini – trapeze and equestrian
- Picaso, Jr. – juggler
- Golden Statues – Ahmed Lamarti, Larbi Benaboura and Amine Goutabi a trio of strong men/hand-balancing
- The Kabanovs – acrobats
- Alexander Petrov and Lucky Kirlova – inclined wire perch pole artists
- Guy Tell and Regina Bouglione – crossbow marksman
- Bogino Troupe – acrobatic tumblers
- Hassani Troupe – tumblers
- Nuts & Bolt – musical comedy
- Olga Rogacheva with Istvan Toth – trained geese
- Fanny Kerwich – clown/acrobat
- Joel Jeske – clown
- Adam Kuchler - clown

== Orchestra ==
Trevor LaBonte~Guitar, July 1999-December 2000

- Rik Albani – orchestra director, trumpet
- Linda Hudes - piano
- Kaoru Ishibashi, Ted Falcon – violinist
- Anthony Cerabino, Nioshi Jackson – drums
- Vanessa Fisher – cello
- Zac Colwell, Steve Welsh – woodwinds
- Bradley Schmidt, Carmen Russo – trombone
- Jonathan Heagle – guitar
- Bob Hillebrecht, Jason Langley – bass

Ishibashi and Colwell first met when hired for the show and subsequently formed the band Jupiter One.

== Touring schedule ==
The production toured the United States between April 1999 and December 2000, visiting 14 cities. Previews were to start February 26, 1999; shows in Sarasota were cancelled and the visit to Austin as a warm-up was postponed when rehearsals took longer than expected and tornado warnings further disrupted the schedule.

Dates	City	Venue	Notes
Feb. – March 1999	Sarasota, FL	Sarasota County Fairgrounds	rehearsals
April 7, 1999 – April 18, 1999	Irvine, CA	Irvine Meadows	soft opening/preview
April 30, 1999 – May 23, 1999	Century City, CA	Century City Mall	official premiere
June 22, 1999 – July 25, 1999	San Mateo, CA	San Mateo County Expo Center	
Aug. 11, 1999 – Sept. 26, 1999	Minneapolis, MN	Mall of America	run extended
Oct. 12, 1999 – Oct. 31, 1999	Austin, TX	Highland Mall	postponed from March
Nov. 17, 1999 – Dec. 12, 1999	Tempe, AZ	Tempe Diablo Stadium	
Dec. 24, 1999 – Jan. 23, 2000	Houston, TX	George R. Brown Convention Center	
Feb. 5, 2000 – Mar. 12, 2000	Dallas, TX	Valley View Center	
Mar. 21, 2000 – April 30, 2000	Chicago, IL	Soldier Field	
May 13, 2000 – June 11, 2000	Cleveland, OH	Nautica Entertainment Complex	
June 23, 2000 – July 16, 2000	Southfield, MI	Green at the Southfield Civic Center	
July 28, 2000 – Aug. 20, 2000	Pittsburgh, PA	Station Square	
Sept. 6, 2000 – Oct. 8, 2000	Atlanta, GA	Centennial Olympic Park	
Nov. 21, 2000 – Dec. 31, 2000	New York, NY	Bryant Park	

A Feld Entertainment press release noted the New York performances marked the first time in its 130-year history that a Ringling Bros. and Barnum & Bailey circus tent was raised in Manhattan. The New York run also had some controversy in what The New York Times dubbed a holiday war between it and the Big Apple Circus.

== Initial results ==
It often set up in parking lots or adjacent to suburban malls. The initial tour was slated to run approximately 45 weeks. Just before the rehearsals commenced, composer Linda Hudes spoke of it as being a three-year tour, with the first year to be spent on the West Coast. Early in the tour (September 1999) it was indicated that future sites for the show would include Philadelphia, Boston, Washington, DC, and Denver but it did not actually visit those cities, perhaps reflecting the difficulty the show had in its first year securing accessible locations in metropolitan areas with visibility.

Feld, in analyzing the initial year of the tour, opined that it was "a new brand that has expanded the family entertainment market ... [It has] blown away our projections by 50%. What we didn't realize at first is that it's a totally new product ... [Sales are] 100% capacity on weekends, 80% during the week." In the aftermath of its successful Chicago run, Feld enthusiastically stated, "When we premiered Barnum's Kaleidoscape last year in Los Angeles I believed that audiences would respond to this unique blend of the circus arts with the luxury and comfort of a theatre. We now know that people do indeed want to experience this other world we have created. Barnum's Kaleidoscape marks our triumphant return to the business of tented shows and we will be in this business for a long time to come."

== End of show ==
By the end of the first year of the tour, Feld spoke of a seven-year tour plan calling for the creation of a second unit in 2001. The first unit would continue playing the United States for four years, then go overseas for three. August 2000 Feld claimed the show "is going to be a major profit center for this company" and he hoped it would return "year after year" to annually play New York. As late as November 2000 there were plans for the show to continue into 2001, playing the West Coast again (San Diego, Los Angeles, San Francisco, Seattle and Denver). Instead, all the 2001 dates were cancelled with promises of a new show to be created, aimed at opening in the fall of 2001 on the East Coast. Then, with no public explanation, the new season never happened. One observer noted, "Barnum’s Kaleidoscape could not overcome the high costs of moving and operating the show under a tent in large markets". Industry observers estimated Feld had spent over $20 million on the show without turning a profit. Replacing Kaledioscape was Ringling's Gold Tour, a less costly truck-based tented show to serve smaller markets begun in 2004.

Larible subsequently returned to the main Ringling shows along with some of the other performers, where he continued headlining through 2005 and returned to Europe to perform in high-profile circuses such as Circus Roncalli. Since 2026, Larible returned to the USA and appeared in Circus Vargas.
