= International Circus Festival of Monte-Carlo =

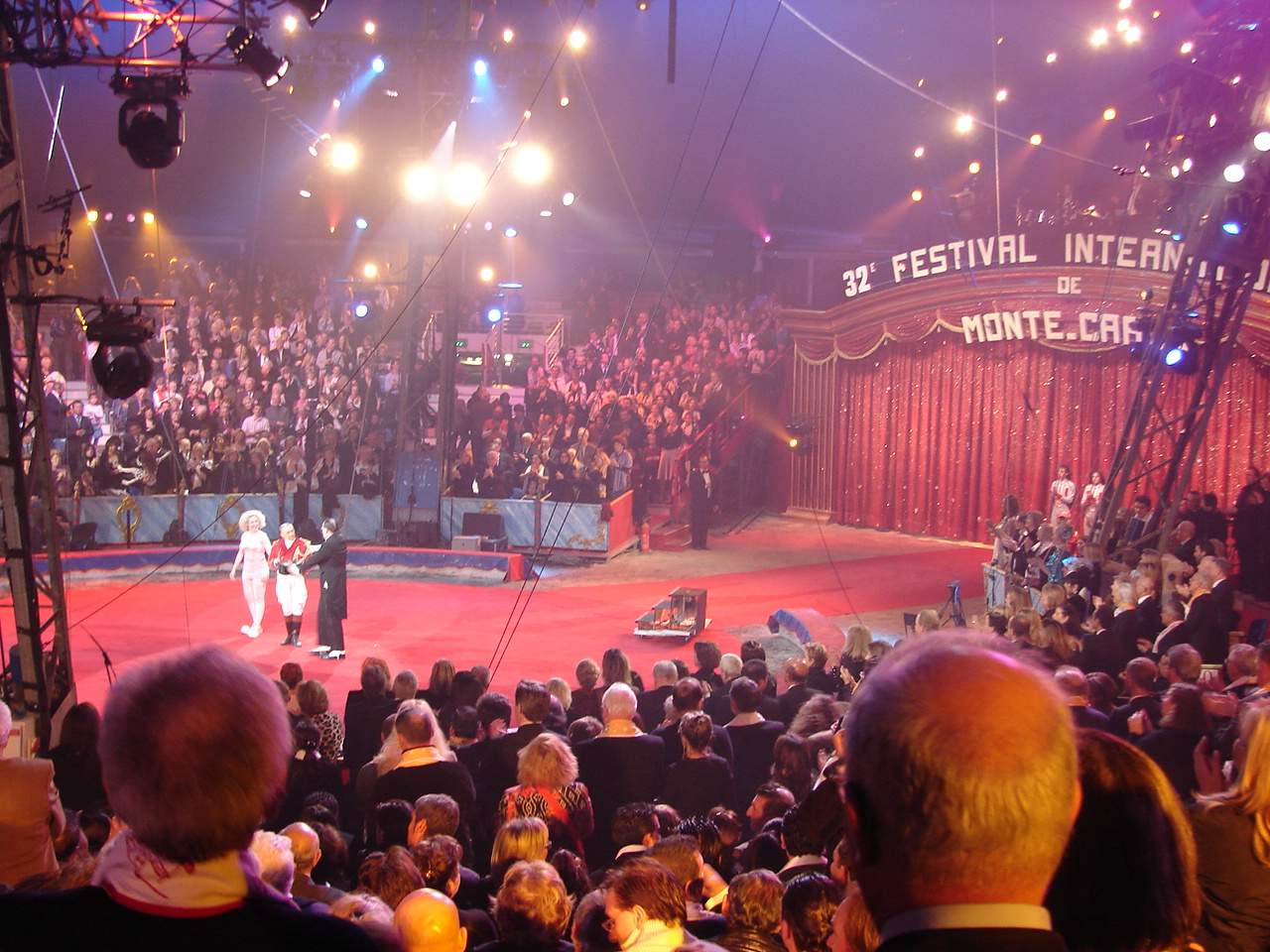
The 32nd International Circus Festival of Monte Carlo, 2008

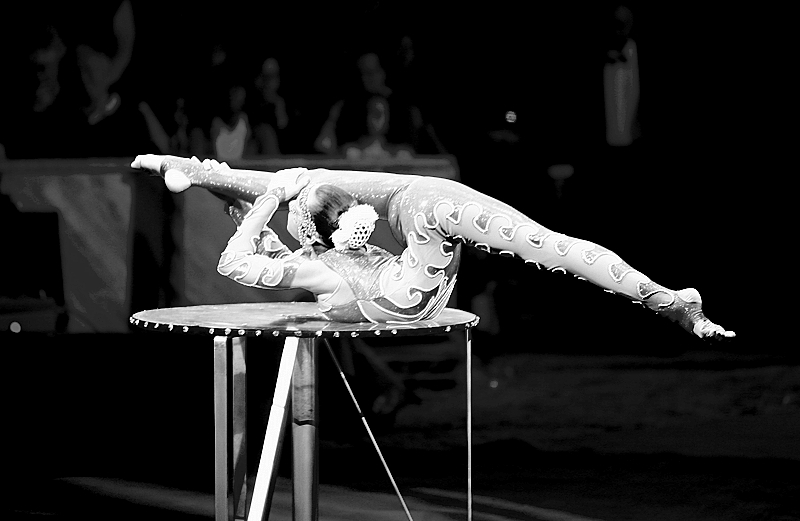
A contortionist performs at the 32nd International Circus Festival of Monte-Carlo in January 2008.

The International Circus Festival of Monte-Carlo (French: Festival International du Cirque de Monte-Carlo) is an annual circus that takes place every January. The festival was created in 1974 by Prince Rainier III of Monaco to recognize and promote circus performers at the pinnacle of their profession. It was initially held in Monte Carlo until the festival's permanent venue in Monaco's Fontvieille district, the Chapiteau de Fontvieille, was completed.

During the festival, circus acts from around the world are performed for paying audiences and are presented to a jury of circus professionals, specialists and journalists. The jury gives awards for the best circus acts, including the Golden Clown (Clown d'or), Silver Clown (Clown d'argent) and Bronze Clown (Clown de bronze), in the form of statuettes. Special prizes are also awarded by various companies, organizations, institutions and individuals. The awards, called Palmarès, are presented during a closing gala performance attended by the Prince of Monaco and his family.

The festival is presided over by Princess Stéphanie of Monaco, who serves as the festival's president and oversees much of the planning of the competitions and gala shows. Princess Stéphanie became president of the event in 2006, succeeding her late father in the role.

Past recipients of the festival's prestigious Clown d'or award have included Spanish clown Charlie Rivel (1974), American daredevil and trapeze artist Elvin Bale (1976), Russian clown Oleg Popov (1981), Italian clown David Larible (1999), American juggler Anthony Gatto (2000), French circus director Alexis Grüss (1975 and 2001), American clown Bello Nock (2011), Russian teeterboard act the Trushin Troupe (2017), Hungarian animal trainers Merrylu and Jozsef Richter (2018), and English animal trainer Martin Lacey Jr. (2010 and 2019).

== Palmares ==
=== Golden Clown ===
- 1974 : Charlie Rivel, clown – Spain – Alfred Court, Animal training – France
- 1975 : Alexis Grüss sénior, Cavalry – France
- 1976 : Elvin Bale, Trapezoid – US
- 1977 : La famille Knie, Cavalry – Switzerland
- 1978 : La troupe Beljakovs, bear training – USSR and The Flying Gaonas – US (Tie)
- 1979 : Leonid Kostiuk and his troop of nine pole vault – USSR – George Carl, clown – France
- 1980 : La troupe Parvanovi, seesaw jumpers – Bulgaria
- 2007 [31]: La Famille Casartelli
- 2008 [32]: Les Frères Pellegrinis, Florian Richter, Li Wei
- 2009 [33]: Cirque Moranbong de Pyong Yang, Flight of Passion
- 2010 [34]: Martin Lacey Jr – Présentation de Fauves, Troupe de Shandong – Numéro d’Icariens
- 2011 [35]: Flavio Togni, Bello Nock
- 2012 [36]: Troupe acrobatique du Cirque de Shanghai pour les numéros de Cai Yong et de la bascule, Famille René Cassely
- 2013 [37]: La Troupe nationale acrobatique de Pékin pour ses deux numéros, Duo Shcherbak & Popov
- 2014 [38]: Desire of Flight, Troupe Sokolov
- 2015 [39]: Artistes de la Troupe nationale de Pyongyang (trapèze volant et pas de deux), Troupe nationale acrobatique de Chine, Anastasia Fedotova-Stykan et ses chevaux, Fumagalli et Daris
- 2016 [40]: Princess Stephanie
- 2017 [41]: Troupe Trushin, Sky Angels
- 2018 [42]: Troupe acrobatique de Shanghai (équilibristes), Merrylu et Jozsef Richter
- 2019 [43]: Martin Lacey Junior, Royal Circus de Gia Eradze
- 2020 [44]: The Cavalry from the Knie Circus, Martinez Brothers, Les Tuniziani
- 2023 [45]: Merrylu et René Jr. Casselly, Quincy Azzario
- 2024 [46]: Charles et Alexandre Grüss, Kolev Sisters, Les éléphantes de Elvis et Cvetomira Errani, Dr. Alain Frère et Mr. Urs Pilz
- 2025 [47]: Galkynysh Equestrian Group – Turkmenistan
- 2026 [48]: The Flying Fuentes Gasca, Troupe Suining, Angelina Richter
