= Wheel of Death (Space Wheel) =

Large rotating circus apparatus

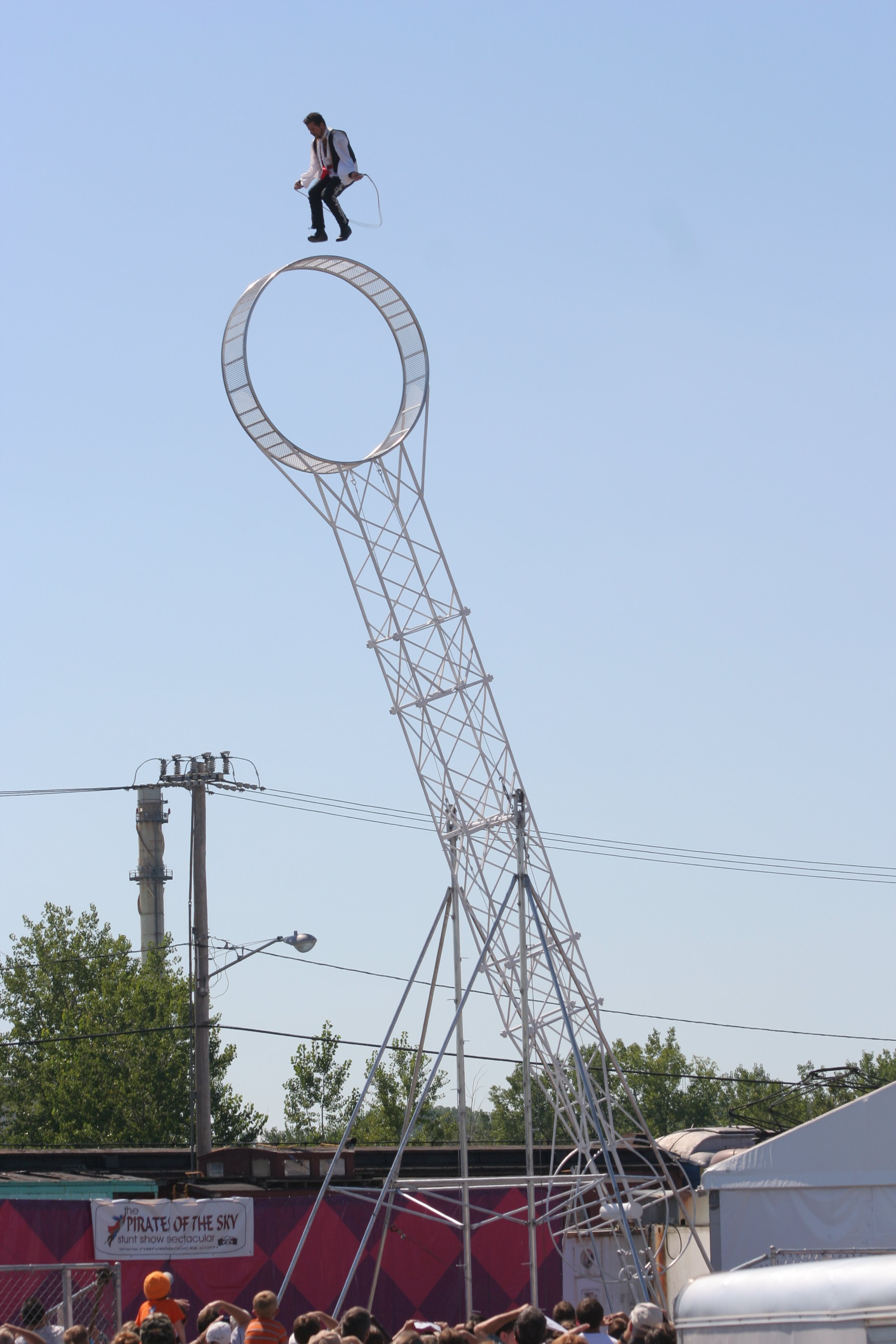
Wheel of Death performance at the New York State Fair in 2008

The Wheel of Death, in the context of acrobatic circus arts, is a large rotating apparatus on which performers carry out synchronized acrobatic skills. The "wheel" is actually a large space frame beam with hooped tracks at either end, within which the performers can stand. As the performers run around on either the inside or outside of the hoops, the whole apparatus rotates. Performers also perform balancing skills with the wheel in a stationary position.

The Wheel of Death is said to have originated in America during the early 1930s and was also known as the Space Wheel. Some early versions were performed by a single artist and incorporated a counterbalance on the other end. Following fatal accidents, the apparatus fell out of favour for a time until it was re-introduced in the 1970s under the name Wheel of Death. For its 2007 touring edition, Ringling Bros. started using the name Wheel of Steel, as the word death was not seen as "family-friendly" from a public relations perspective.

Noted artists who have performed on the wheel include Nik Wallenda, Elvin Bale and Bello Nock.

== See also ==
- Cyr wheel
- Wheel gymnastics
