= David Larible =

Italian clown

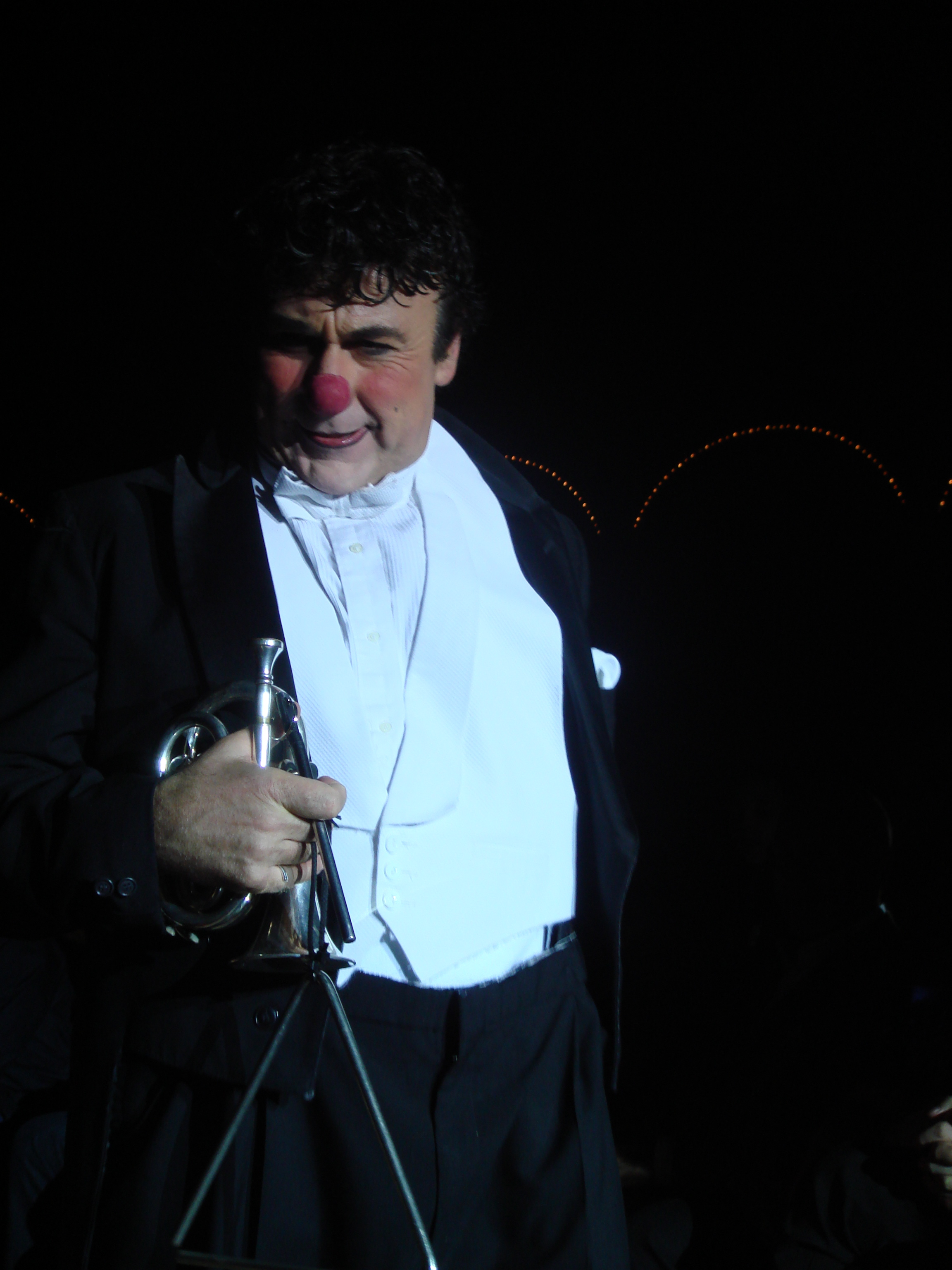
- David Larible, as "Maestro Mortale"
- Born: 23 June 1957 (age 68); Verona, Italy
- Known for: Clown
- Awards: Golden Clown at the International Circus Festival of Monte-Carlo (1999)
- Website: www.davidlarible.it

David Larible (born 23 June 1957 in Verona, Italy) is an Italian clown.

== Early life and family ==
David Larible comes from six generations of circus artists, and his family has ties with many other European circus families. His great-grandfather was Pierre Larible, an acrobat and dancer; his grandfather was also a clown. Larible's father, Eugenio Larible (1931-2017), was a trapeze artist and juggler who taught at a circus school in Verona. Larible's mother, Lucina Casartelli (1931-2003), was a child circus artist, as was Lucina's father. David Larible has three sisters: Eliana Paul, married to Bernhard Paul; Cinzia Larible-Gerard; and the trapeze artist Vivien, married to Noè España.

Born in 1957 in Verona, Italy, Larible grew up performing in various circuses. His father Eugenio appeared as a juggler and performed together with his uncle Renzo on the trapeze.

== Career ==
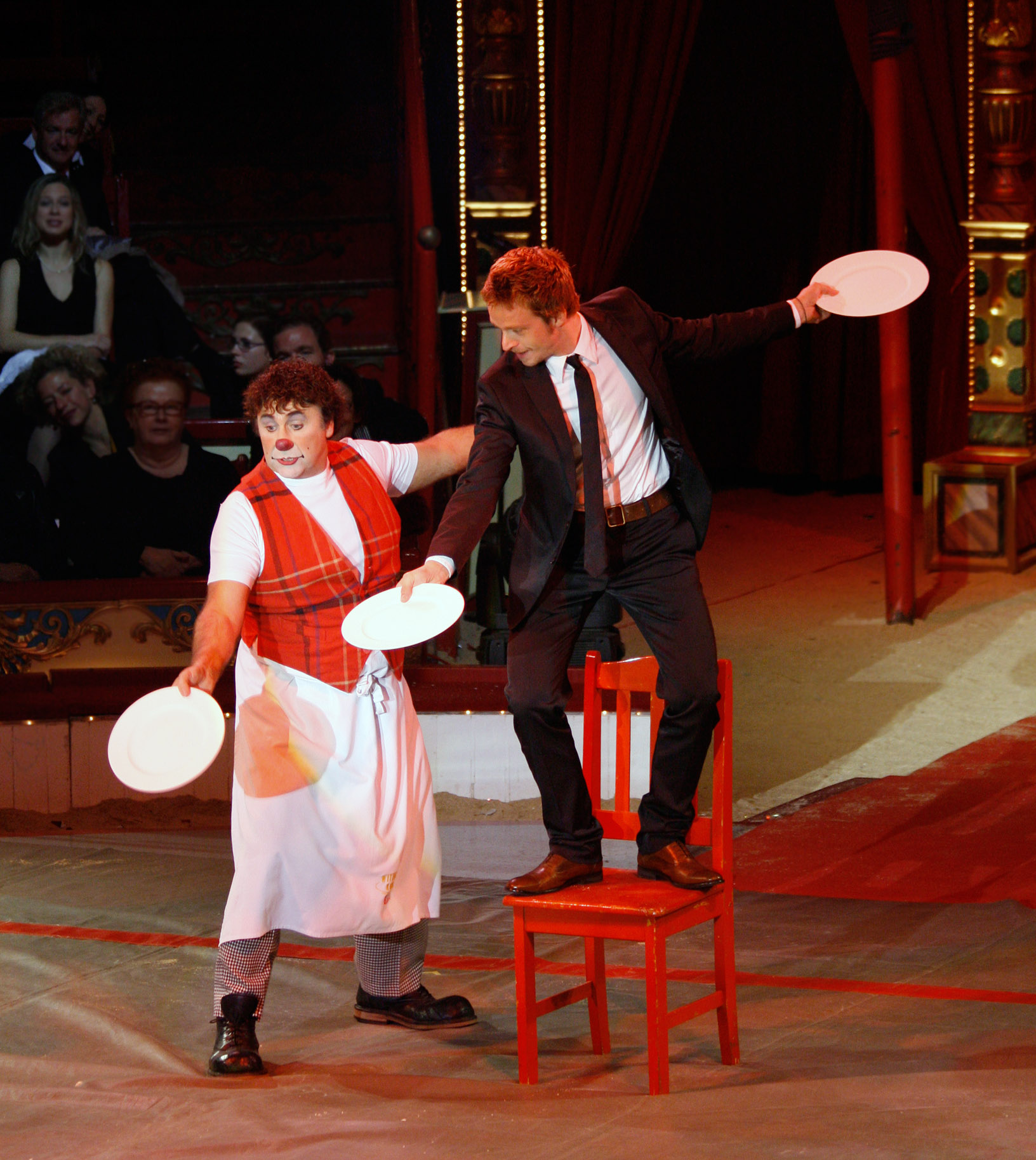
Larible with Circus Roncalli (Vienna, 2009)

As a child, David Larible was taught acrobatics and juggling by his father Eugenio. In 1968, he began an apprenticeship with the Conservatory of Music in Verona. His first official appearance in the ring was in 1973 at the Circus Medrano. There, he performed with his family in a roller-skating number.

In the 1970s, followed by engagements in Switzerland, he joined the French circus Circus Nock in Bouglione. In the early 1980s, Larible's parents were involved in Circus Krone; he begged the then-director of Circus Frieda Sembach-Krone to let him step in as a clown. He exploited this opportunity and built the relatively small number still further.

Other engagements followed. After a three-year guest appearance at the Italian Circus Togni, Larible returned to Munich to rejoin the Circus Krone, where he remained until 1989. During this period, he was a producer of ZDF's television series Circus - Animals, Clowns and Acrobats. He performed as part of the Circus of the Stars. In the 1980s, he began to incorporate involvement by the audience into his act. Today this remains one of his trademarks.

In 1989, Larible left Germany and started performing in England and Mexico. In 1991, he joined the biggest and most famous circus in the United States - Ringling Bros. and Barnum & Bailey Circus. From 1993 to 2005, he was under contract and quickly became the main attraction. His time in the United States was characterized by hard work and achievement. Larible says, "I would not miss a day, even if I was sick, I went on." During those years, he developed other trademarks, inventing new numbers and perfecting his performance. He went on to appear in Barnum's Kaleidoscape, a new concept for the United States circus.

David and his sister Vivien appeared in Disney's sing-along songs "Lets Go to the Circus". David also appeared on Sesame Street with his daughter Shirley in a film segment about what it's like to be in the circus.

Larible had a brief appearance in the film Ocean's Eleven in 2001.

In 2005, Larible returned to Europe. Since 2006 he has been involved with the German Circus Roncalli.

In 2014, he performed with the Swiss Circus Knie.

In 2018 he resumed international tours with his performance in prestigious theatres such as the Gran Teatro Nacional in Lima and the Colsubsidio in Bogota.

He was Special guest in the program "Moscow - Monte Carlo" in the Nikulin Circus (the oldest in Moscow) as well as main attraction at the Circus Ciniselli in St. Petersburg in two different productions

In the same year take part in the International Clown Festival where he receives the Grand Prix for Lifetime Achievement.

In 2019 he directs and interprets the show "Gran Circo de Europa" in Peru and was invited by the greatest Russian Theatre Actor Sergey Bezrukov to participate at the Theatre Festival "Grandkidsfest" with the show "The Clown Of Clowns", for a great success.

== Techniques and influences ==
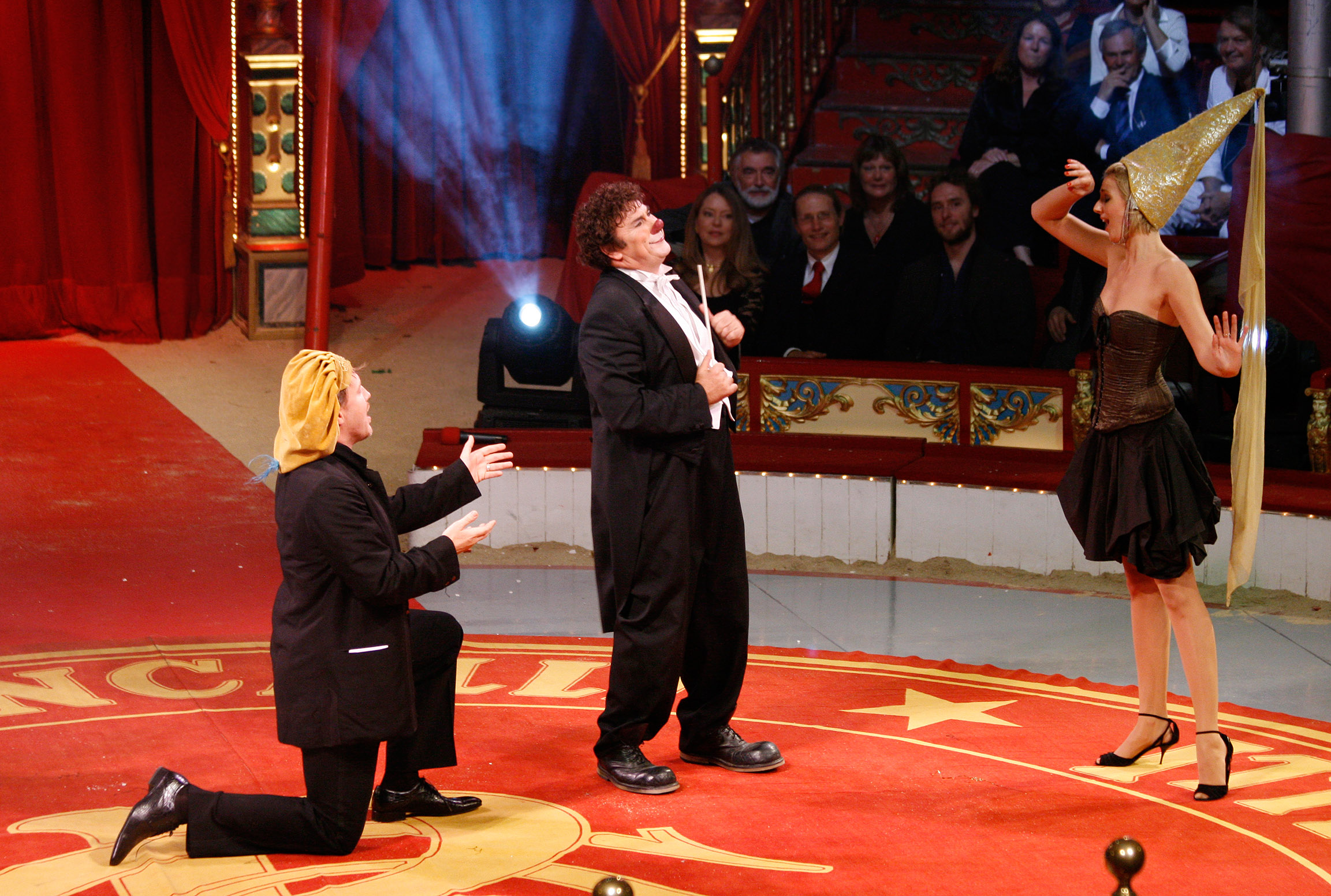
Larible with Circus Roncalli (Vienna, 2009)

David Larible is known for his classic auguste clown technique. Larible has a wide repertoire as a dancer, singer, musician and juggler. He is inspired by classical music, opera and ballet. One of his specialities is direct interaction with the audience and involvement by spectators. His influences include Charlie Chaplin, Charlie Rivel and Grock. In his gestures and facial expressions, he reminds the audience of Chaplin, but he has developed his own style and presence in the ring. He often uses music composed by Chaplin in his performances.

== Awards and prizes ==
- 1988: received the Silver Clown award and junior jury prize at the International Circus Festival of Monte-Carlo
- 1994: received the Platinum Circus Ring at the International Circus Festival of Genoa
- 1999: awarded the Golden Clown at the International Circus Festival of Monte-Carlo
- 1999: became the first non-Chinese recipient of the Golden Lion Award for significant artistic achievements at the WuQiao International Circus Festival in Shijiazhuang, China

== Personal life ==
In 1982, Larible married the (then active) Mexican-American trapeze artist America Olivera Jimenez. The couple have two children: daughter Shirley (1989) named after child actress Shirley Temple and son David Pierre (1997).

Besides his native Italian, David Larible is fluent in French, Spanish, Portuguese, English and German.

=== Legal proceeding ===
In 2017 he was found guilty of sexual acts with an 14-year-old girl in his hotel room in Zurich. He was accused of giving her three French kisses, stroking the girl's back and waist and kissing her on her décolleté. He denied all allegations. He was banned from Switzerland for five years and was given a conditional fine of SFr 19,200 (£15,328 in 2017). As compensation the victim received SFr 1,400 (£1,118) in damages and SFr 2,000 (£1,597) as gratification. Eliminalia removed stories related to the conviction.
