= Bello Nock =

American daredevil and circus performer

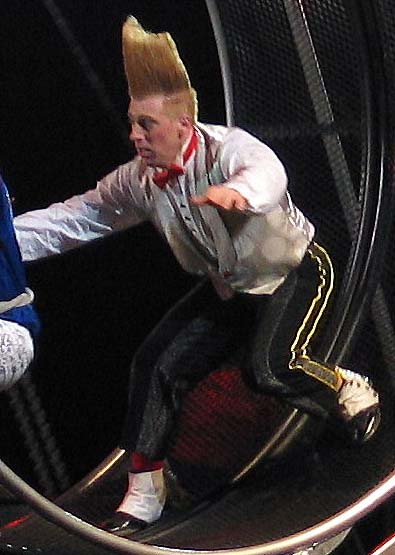
- Bello performing on the Wheel of Steel
- Born: September 27, 1968 (age 58); Sarasota, Florida, U.S.
- Occupations: Circus performer; daredevil; clown

YouTube information
- Channel: BelloNockOfficial

Demetrius Alexandro Claudio Amadeus Bello Nock (born September 27, 1968), often known simply as Bello, is an American comic-daredevil and circus performer. Nock has been listed in the Guinness Book of World Records for the longest unsupported tightrope walk. He has performed several stunts in New York City, including rappelling off of Madison Square Garden and hanging from a helicopter over the Statue of Liberty. He has been included in a Time magazine list of "America's Best Artists and Entertainers".

Born in Sarasota, Florida, Nock is a seventh-generation circus performer, a descendant of the family that founded Switzerland's famous Circus Nock in the 18th century. He was a star attraction for the Big Apple Circus and for the Ringling Bros. and Barnum & Bailey Circus before pursuing an independent career as a performer.

In 2001, Time magazine included him on a list of "America's Best Artists and Entertainers", as "America's Best Clown". In 2004, the Daily News said that he "might be the greatest athlete ever to set foot in the World's Most Famous Arena" (Madison Square Garden). In 2009, he was inducted into the Circus Ring of Fame. In 2025, he was inducted into the International Clown Hall Of Fame.

Nock appeared on America's Got Talent in 2017; in 2018, his daughter Annaliese reached the second round with an exploding coffin act. In 2019, he took part in Britain's Got Talent: The Champions with his daughter Annaliese. In 2020, he started a YouTube channel. He is a born-again Christian. On August 21, 2026 in Fort Worth, Texas, Bello rejoined the Ringling Bros. Circus as a guest performer and it was announced that he would continue to perform for the remainder of the tour.
