= Culture of the United Kingdom =

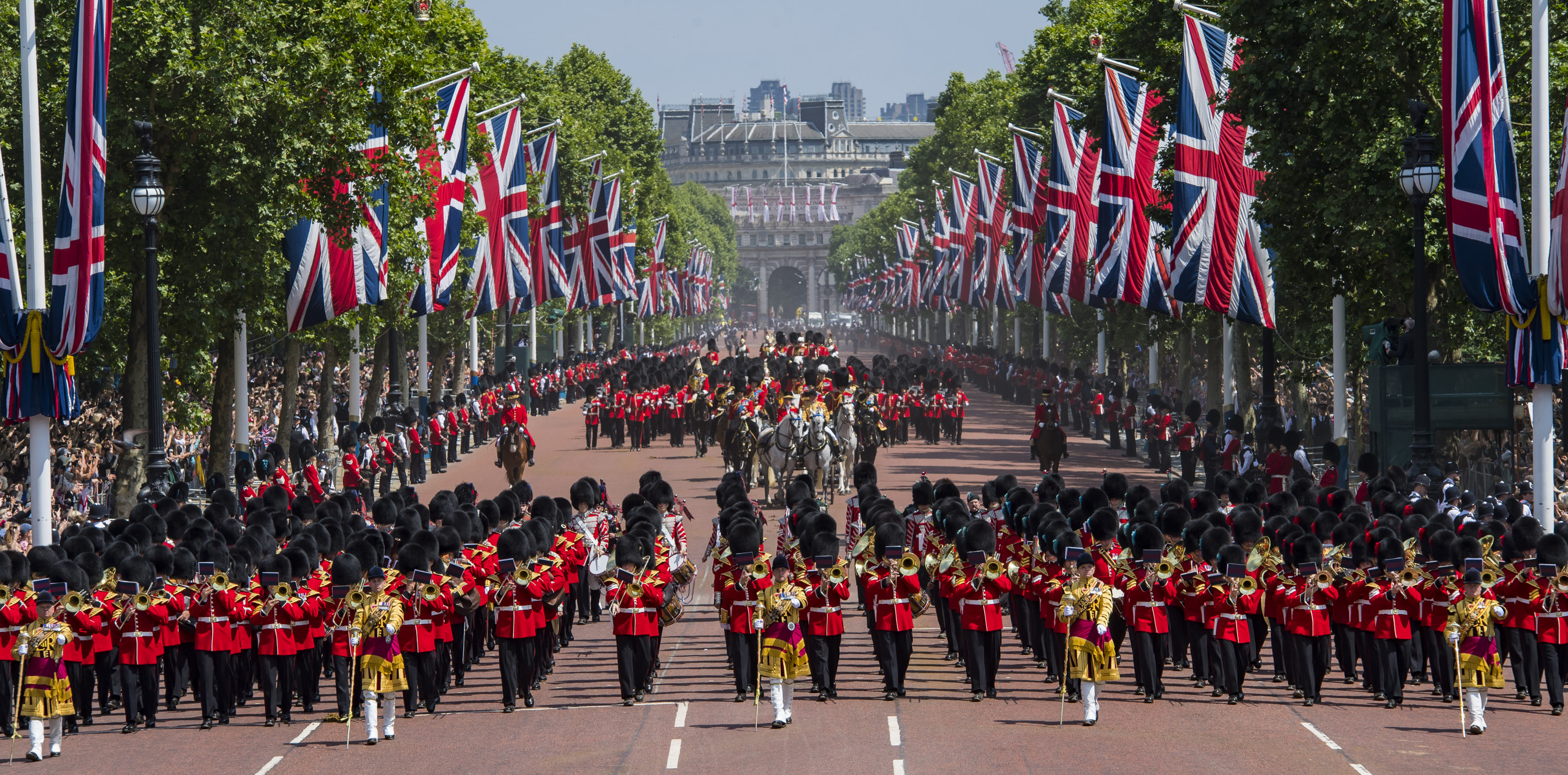
Trooping the Colour is an annual ceremony, most notably associated with the British Army, and involves a grand parade featuring hundreds of soldiers, horses, and musicians.

The culture of the United Kingdom is influenced by the histories of its constituent nations, its interaction with the cultures of Europe, the individual diverse cultures of England, Wales, Scotland and Northern Ireland, and the impact of the British Empire. The culture of the United Kingdom may also be referred to as British culture. Although British culture is a distinct entity, the individual cultures of England, Scotland, Wales and Northern Ireland are diverse. These four cultures overlap to varying degrees. British literature is particularly esteemed. The modern novel was developed in Britain, and playwrights, poets, and authors are among its most prominent cultural figures.

Britain has also made notable contributions to theatre, literature, music, mainstream and independent cinema, art, architecture and television. The UK is also the home of the Church of England, Church of Scotland, Church in Wales, the state church and mother church of the Anglican Communion, the third-largest Christian denomination. Britain contains some of the world's oldest universities, has made many contributions to philosophy, science, technology and medicine, and is the birthplace of many prominent scientists and inventions. The Industrial Revolution began in the UK and had a profound effect on socio-economic and cultural conditions around the world.

British culture has been influenced by historical and modern immigration, the historical invasions of Great Britain, and the British Empire. As a result of the British Empire, significant British influence can be observed in the language, law, culture and institutions of its former colonies, most of which are members of the Commonwealth of Nations. A subset of these states form the Anglosphere, and are among Britain's closest allies. British colonies and dominions influenced British culture in turn, particularly British cuisine.

Sport is central to British culture, with cricket, football, boxing, tennis, and rugby modernising in Britain. The UK has been described as a "cultural superpower", and London has been described as a world cultural capital. A global opinion poll for the BBC saw the UK ranked the third most positively viewed nation in the world (behind Germany and Canada) in 2013 and 2014.

Music is a vibrant sector of British culture with musicians like the Beatles, Ed Sheeran, Elton John and many more. Dubbed the "British Invasion", its music reached many countries like the United States and those in Europe in the 1960s. Today, they influence a large part of music in general and also media and entertainment in the United Kingdom.

== History ==
Throughout its history, the culture of Great Britain has primarily consisted of the separate native traditions of England, Scotland and Wales. With regard to cultural influences, prior to the expansion of the British Empire, the island had been most notably influenced by French culture (via the Normans), Scandinavian culture (via the Vikings) and Italian culture (via the Romans).

The arrival of Celtic and Germanic tribes influenced Britain's early development. The Celtic peoples introduced unique languages, traditions, and social structures. Subsequently, the migrations of Germanic tribes, such as the Anglo-Saxons, further influenced Britain's cultural landscape. The ancient Roman occupation of Britain, lasting almost 400 years, also impacted the linguistic and cultural identity of Great Britain.

Following the expansion of the British Empire, England, Scotland and Wales absorbed different peoples from around the world, and, post-World War II, Britain developed a more diverse cultural landscape through higher levels of immigration. Furthermore, following the Fall of the Berlin Wall in 1989 and EU enlargement in 2004 and 2007, the UK experienced a significant rise in immigration from Eastern Europe. Today, the UK has a sizable immigrant population, and encompasses the cultures of British people from various backgrounds, with South Asian, Continental European, African and Caribbean descent being most prevalent.

== Language ==
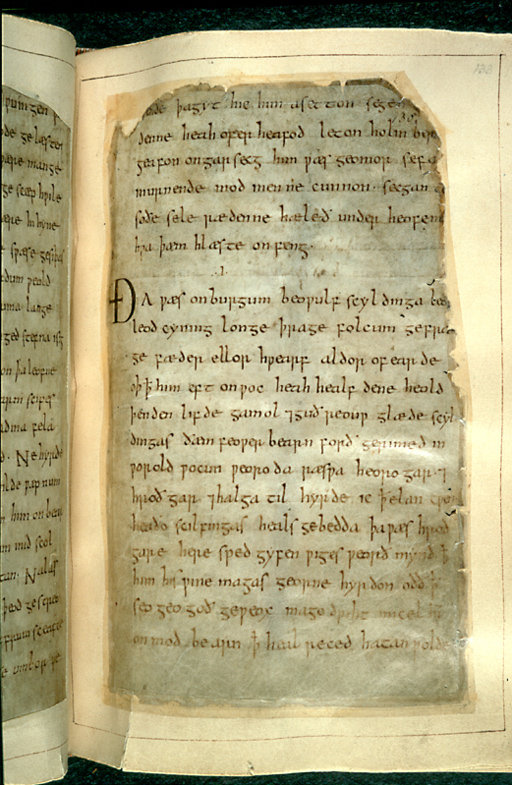
The Old English heroic poem Beowulf is located in the British Library.

First spoken in early medieval England, the English language is the de facto official language of the UK, and is spoken monolingually by an estimated 95% of the British population. (Note: English is established by de facto usage. In Wales, the Bwrdd yr Iaith Gymraeg is legally tasked with ensuring that "in the conduct of public business and the administration of justice, the English and Welsh languages should be treated on a basis of equality".Welsh Language Act 1993, Office of Public Sector Information Bòrd na Gàidhlig is tasked with "securing the status of the Gaelic language as an official language of Scotland commanding equal respect to the English language" Gaelic Language (Scotland) Act 2005, Office of Public Sector Information, archived from the original on 15 March 2010) Seven other languages are recognised by the British Government under the European Charter for Regional or Minority Languages – Welsh, Scottish Gaelic, Scots, Cornish, Irish, Ulster Scots, and British Sign Language.

In Wales, all pupils at state schools must either be taught through the medium of Welsh or study it as an additional language until age 16, and the Welsh Language Act 1993 and the Government of Wales Act 1998 provide that the Welsh and English languages should be treated equally in the public sector, so far as is reasonable and practicable. Irish and Ulster Scots enjoy limited use alongside English in Northern Ireland, mainly in publicly commissioned translations. The Gaelic Language (Scotland) Act, passed by the Scottish Parliament in 2005, recognised Gaelic as an official language of Scotland and required the creation of a national plan for Gaelic to provide strategic direction for the development of the Gaelic language. (Note: Under the European Charter for Regional or Minority Languages the Welsh, Scottish Gaelic, Cornish, Irish, Ulster Scots and Scots languages are officially recognised as Regional or Minority languages by the UK Government (European Charter for Regional or Minority Languages, Scottish Executive, archived from the original on 12 October 2008) See also Languages of the United Kingdom.) The Cornish language is a revived language that became extinct as a first language in Cornwall in the late 18th century.

=== Regional accents ===
Dialects and regional accents vary heavily amongst the four countries of the United Kingdom, as well as within the countries themselves. This is partially the result of the long history of immigration to the UK, for example Northern English dialects contain many words with Old Norse roots. Scottish English, Welsh English, and Hiberno-Irish are varieties of English distinct from both English English and the native languages of those countries. Received Pronunciation is the Standard English accent in England and Wales, while in Scotland Scottish Standard English is a distinct dialect. Although these accents have a high social prestige, since the 1960s a greater permissiveness toward regional English varieties has taken hold in education.

The great variety of British accents is often noted, with nearby regions often having highly distinct dialects and accents, for example there are large differences between Scouse and Mancunian despite Liverpool and Manchester being only 35 miles (56 km) apart. Dialectal English is often found in literature, for example Emily Brontë's novel Wuthering Heights contains Yorkshire dialect.

== Arts ==
=== Literature ===
The United Kingdom inherited the literary traditions of England, Scotland and Wales. These include Arthurian literature and its Welsh origins, Norse-influenced Old English literature, the works of English authors Geoffrey Chaucer and William Shakespeare, and Scots works such as John Barbour's The Brus.

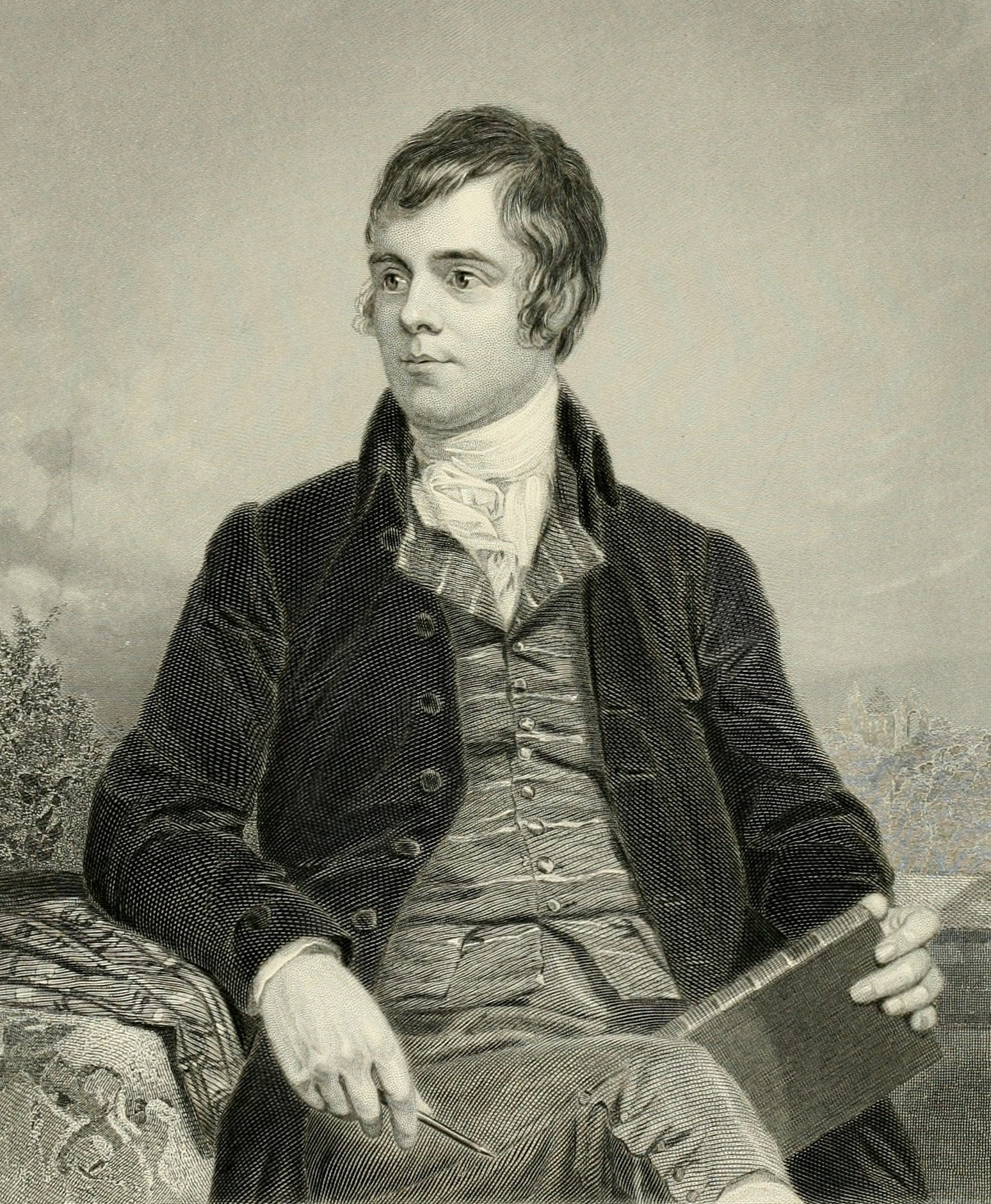
Robert Burns is regarded as the national poet of Scotland.

==== Augustan Age ====
The early 18th century period of British literature is known as the Augustan Age and included the development of the novel. Daniel Defoe's Robinson Crusoe (1719) and Moll Flanders (1722) are often seen as the first English novels. Alongside these works, poetry also flourished, with notable examples such as The Rape of the Lock (1712) by Alexander Pope, a mock-heroic poem that satirised the social mores of the time. However, the development of the novel took place in a wider literary context that included the rise of prose satires – which reached a high point with Gulliver's Travels (1729) by Anglo-Irish writer Jonathan Swift, and earlier foreign works like the Spanish Don Quixote. Other novels by Jonathan Swift include A Tale of a Tub (1704), An Argument Against Abolishing Christianity (1712), and A Modest Proposal (1729). With the publishing of these books, he gained literary fame and formed lifelong friendships with Alexander Pope, John Gay, and John Arbuthnot, who, with Swift, created the Martinus Scriblerus Club in 1713. Other novels made at this time are: Tom Jones (1749), by Henry Fielding; Pamela (1740) and Clarissa (1748), by Samuel Richardson; Laurence Sterne – The Life and Opinions of Tristram Shandy, Gentleman (1759–1767). Pamela is hailed as one of the first true novels in English literature while Clarissa is regarded as Richardson's magnum opus and one of the greatest novels in the English language. The Life and Opinions of Tristram Shandy, Gentleman is an experimental novel.

The Augustan period saw Samuel Johnson's A Dictionary of the English Language. Published in 1755, it was viewed as the pre-eminent British dictionary until the completion of the Oxford English Dictionary 150 years later. Each word defined in detail, with descriptions of their various uses and numerous literary quotes as illustrations. This was the first dictionary of its kind, containing 40,000 words and nearly 114,000 quotes packed together with Johnson's personal touch. It became an influential work of English lexicography. Dr Johnson's House identifies a consortium of London publishers as having commissioned Johnson to write the dictionary. The consortium included Robert Dodsley, Andrew Millar and Charles Hitch, and contracted Johnson for 1,500 guineas (£1,575), equivalent to about £300,000 in 2025. Johnson took seven years to complete the work, despite claiming he could finish it in three. Johnson's Dictionary was warmly received. Lord Macaulay described it in 1856 as "the first dictionary which could be read with pleasure". Johnson's innovations helped establish his dictionary as the first widely recognised standard English dictionary.

Richard Steele, another famous author known for comedies and pamphlets during the Augustan Period, began his literary career with "The Christian Hero" (1701), a moral pamphlet that was criticised due to his personal lifestyle, followed by the successful comedy The Funeral later that year. In 1703, he wrote The Lying Lover, an early sentimental comedy that failed on stage. In 1705, he collaborated with Joseph Addison on The Tender Husband and contributed the prologue to John Vanbrugh's The Mistake. Steele's major breakthrough came in 1709 with the creation of The Tatler, a tri-weekly periodical in which he wrote the majority of the essays under the pseudonym Isaac Bickerstaff, aiming to expose societal vices and promote simplicity. Despite its success, The Tatler was shut down in 1711 due to political pressure, prompting Steele and Addison to co-found The Spectator in 1711 and The Guardian in 1713, solidifying Steele's role as a leading figure in early British journalism.

==== Romantic Period ====
The Romantic Period was marked by a revival of poetry and a focus on emotion, nature, and individualism, responding to the growing rationalism of the Enlightenment. This era gave rise to many literary works that explored the tension between reason and imagination. William Wordsworth and Samuel Taylor Coleridge's Lyrical Ballads (1798) is considered a landmark collection, emphasising the beauty of nature and the primacy of emotion, and marking the official start of the Romantic Movement. Mary Shelley's Frankenstein; or, The Modern Prometheus (1818), one of the earliest science fiction novels, delves into themes of creation, responsibility, and the consequences of unchecked scientific ambition, framed within Gothic conventions. Jane Austen's Pride and Prejudice (1813) offered a brilliant social satire, critiquing class structures and the courtship rituals of Regency England, and remains one of the most beloved novels in British Literature. Lord Byron's Don Juan (1819–1824) is a satirical epic poem that details the adventures of the legendary lover, displaying Byron's wit, irony, and irreverence toward societal norms.

Sir Walter Scott's Waverley (1814), widely considered the first historical novel, vividly recreates the Jacobite Rebellion of 1745, cementing Scott's place as a major figure in British literature. William Blake's Songs of Innocence and of Experience (1794) blends art and poetry to explore themes of innocence, experience, and societal corruption, providing a unique vision of the Romantic spirit. Percy Bysshe Shelley’s Prometheus Unbound (1820), a lyrical drama, explores themes of rebellion, tyranny, and human freedom, standing as one of his most radical and imaginative works. Robert Burns, the famed Scottish poet, revived interest in Scots literature with works such as Auld Lang Syne, which celebrated the vernacular tradition. Lastly, Mary Wollstonecraft's "A Vindication of the Rights of Woman" (1792) stands as one of the earliest and most influential works of feminist philosophy, advocating for women's education and equal rights in a male-dominated society.

Although primarily associated with the Victorian Era, Lewis Carroll's Alice’s Adventures in Wonderland (1865) emerged from the later part of this broader Romantic tradition, blending imaginative fantasy with playful wordplay. This whimsical novel follows young Alice's journey through a dreamlike world populated by peculiar characters, exploring themes of logic, absurdity, and identity. Alice's Adventures in Wonderland remains a pioneering work of literary nonsense, captivating readers with its inventive narrative and surreal exploration of the boundaries between reality and imagination.

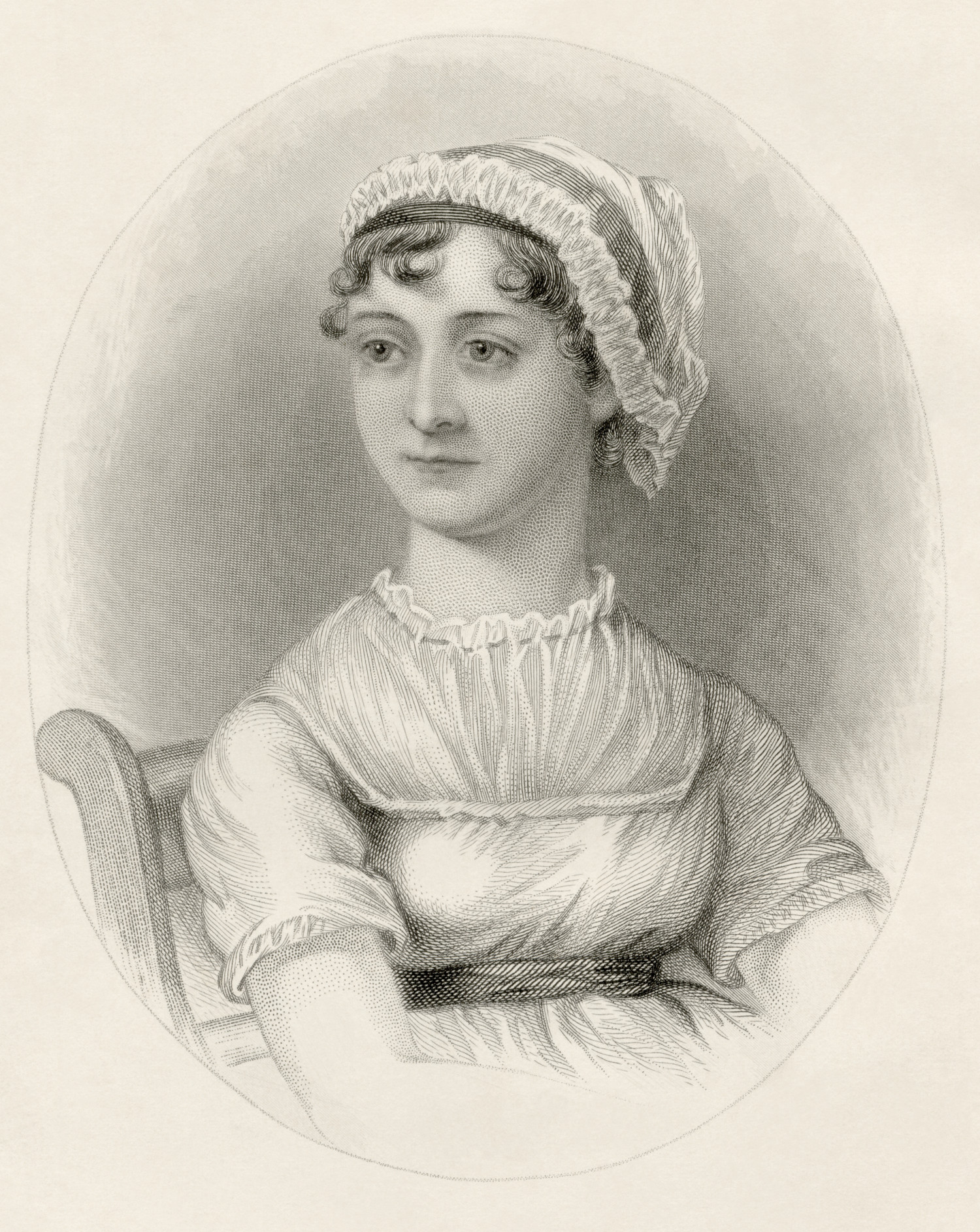
English novelist Jane Austen was held by literary critic Harold Bloom to be one of the greatest Western writers of all time.

==== Victorian Era ====
The late Georgian Era and Victorian era saw a renewed focus on the novel. A key theme of these novels was social commentary. Early in the period Jane Austen satirised the lifestyle of the gentry and nobility, while the later novels of Charles Dickens often used humour and keen observations to criticise poverty and social stratification. One of his novels, Oliver Twist, describes Victorian Times and the sordid lives of criminals and exposes the cruel treatment of the many orphans in London. Another novel by Charles Dickens, Great Expectations (1861), is a bildungsroman that follows the life of Pip, an orphan navigating ambition, love, and personal growth while critiquing social mobility and class divisions. Charlotte Brontë's Jane Eyre (1847) blends Gothic romance with social commentary, focusing on a young woman's quest for independence against the rigid structures of Victorian society. The three Brontë sisters and George Eliot commented on Northern England and the Midlands respectively, though all four women wrote under male pen names during their lifetimes, partly to deflect anti-feminist criticism. Nevertheless, openly female authors achieved considerable success in the period, such as the predominantly religious poems of Elizabeth Barrett Browning and Christina Rossetti. George Eliot's Middlemarch (1871–1872), often regarded as one of the greatest English novels, explores themes of politics, marriage, and ambition in the setting of a provincial English town.

Elizabeth Gaskell's North and South (1854–1855) contrasts the industrial north with the agricultural south, addressing issues such as class conflict, industrialization, and gender roles. Thomas Hardy's Tess of the d’Urbervilles (1891) offers a tragic critique of Victorian society's treatment of women, sexuality, and class, while Oscar Wilde's The Picture of Dorian Gray (1890) examines themes of aestheticism, morality, and vanity in a Gothic narrative where the protagonist's portrait ages as his soul corrupts. In Robert Louis Stevenson's The Strange Case of Dr. Jekyll and Mr. Hyde (1886), the novella delves into themes of duality, identity, and morality through the split personality of its protagonist. Arthur Conan Doyle's The Adventures of Sherlock Holmes (1892), a group of short stories, which popularised the detective genre and introduced one of literature's most iconic characters: Sherlock Holmes.

Rudyard Kipling's literature exemplifies the British Empire's influence on British literature through his works that often reflect the ethos of imperialism and colonialism. His novels The Jungle Book, which is considered to be classic piece of literature, and The Man Who Would Be King are both set in British India, showcasing the cultural and political impact of British rule in the region. His poem 'If—' famously captures the concept of the "stiff upper lip," a British ideal of stoicism and self-discipline. Kipling's works, while celebrated for their literary qualities, remain controversial for their imperialist themes.

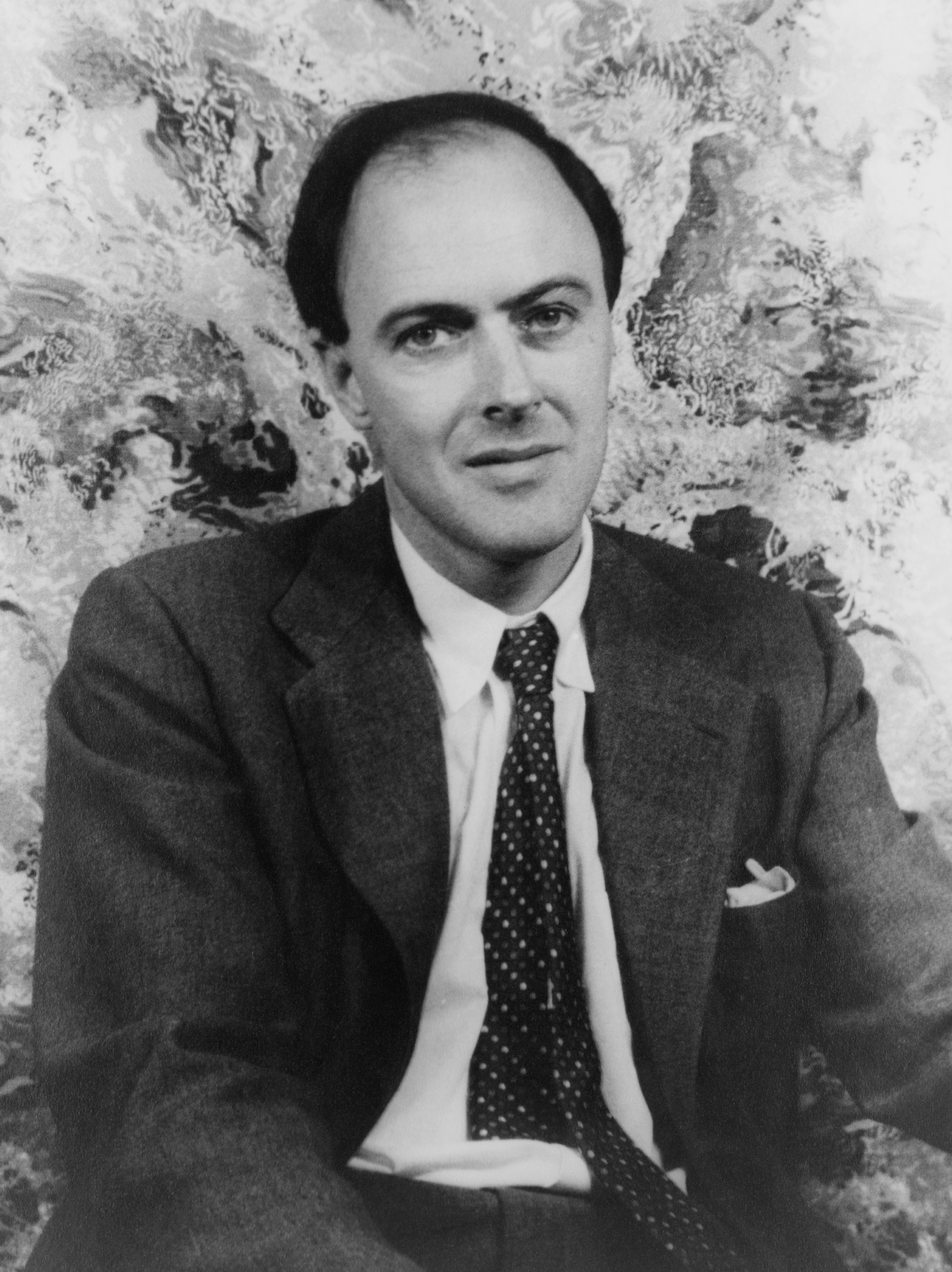
Welsh native Roald Dahl is frequently ranked the best children's author in British polls.

==== World War and Modern Literature ====
World War I gave rise to British war poets and writers such as Wilfred Owen, Siegfried Sassoon, and Rupert Brooke, who wrote (often paradoxically) of their expectations of war, and their experiences in the trenches. Initially idealistic and patriotic in tone, as the war progressed the tone of the movement became increasingly sombre and pacifistic. The beginning of the twentieth century also saw the Celtic Revival stimulate a new appreciation of traditional Irish literature, while the Scottish Renaissance brought modernism to Scottish literature as well as an interest in new forms in the literatures of Scottish Gaelic and Scots. The English novel developed in the 20th century into much greater variety and it remains today the dominant English literary form.

The contemporary British literary scene is marked by awards such as the Booker Prize, created in 1969, and festivals including the Welsh Hay Festival, held since 1988. The prominent status of children's literature in the UK was demonstrated in the opening ceremony of the London 2012 Olympic Games, which contained sequence dedicated to prominent children's literary characters. In 2003 the BBC carried out a British survey entitled The Big Read in order to find the "nation's best-loved novel", with works by English novelists J. R. R. Tolkien, Jane Austen, Philip Pullman, Douglas Adams and J. K. Rowling making up the top five on the list. More than 75% of the British public read at least one book annually. The UK is also among the largest publishers of books. As of 2017, six firms in the United Kingdom rank among the world's biggest publishers of books in terms of revenue: Bloomsbury, Cambridge University Press, Informa, Oxford University Press, Pearson, and RELX Group.

=== Theatre ===
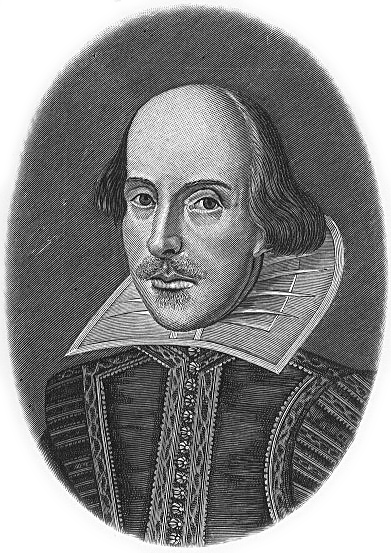
William Shakespeare has had a significant impact on British theatre and drama.

From its formation in 1707 the United Kingdom has had a vibrant tradition of theatre, much of it inherited from England, Scotland and Wales. The Union of the Crowns coincided with the decline of highbrow and provocative Restoration comedy in favour of sentimental comedy, domestic tragedy such as George Lillo's The London Merchant (1731), and by an overwhelming interest in Italian opera. Popular entertainment became more important in this period than ever before, with fair-booth burlesque and mixed forms that are the ancestors of the English music hall. These forms flourished at the expense of other forms of English drama, which went into a long period of decline. In Scotland the opposite occurred, with the emergence of specifically Scottish plays including John Home's Douglas and the works of Walter Scott, which included original plays as well as adaptations of his Waverley novels. The late 19th century saw revival of English theatre with arrival of Irishmen George Bernard Shaw and Oscar Wilde, who influenced domestic English drama and revitalised it. Their contemporaries Gilbert and Sullivan had a similar impact on musical theatre with their comic operas. The Shakespeare Memorial Theatre was opened in Shakespeare's birthplace Stratford upon Avon in 1879 and Herbert Beerbohm Tree founded an Academy of Dramatic Art at Her Majesty's Theatre in 1904.

The early twentieth century was dominated by drawing-room plays produced by the likes of Noël Coward, which were then challenged by the kitchen sink realism and absurdist drama influenced by Irishman Samuel Beckett in the 1950s and 60s. Conversely 1952 saw the first performance of Agatha Christie's The Mousetrap, a drawing-room murder mystery that has seen over 25,000 performances and is the longest-running West End show. At the same time the performing arts theatre Sadler's Wells, under Lilian Baylis, nurtured talent that led to the development of an opera company, which became the English National Opera (ENO); a theatre company, which evolved into the National Theatre; and a ballet company, which eventually became the English Royal Ballet. Elsewhere the Royal Shakespeare Company was founded in 1959 at Stratford-upon-Avon, and continues to mainly stage Shakespeare's plays.

Contemporary British theatre is focused on the West End, London's major theatre district. The Theatre Royal, Drury Lane in the City of Westminster dates back to 1663, making it the oldest London theatre, however the Theatre Royal at the Bristol Old Vic is the oldest continually-operating theatre in the English speaking world, opening in 1768. The musicals of Andrew Lloyd Webber have dominated the West End since the late 20th century, leading him to be dubbed "the most commercially successful composer in history". A National Theatre of Scotland was set up in 2006.

=== Music ===
==== Classical music ====
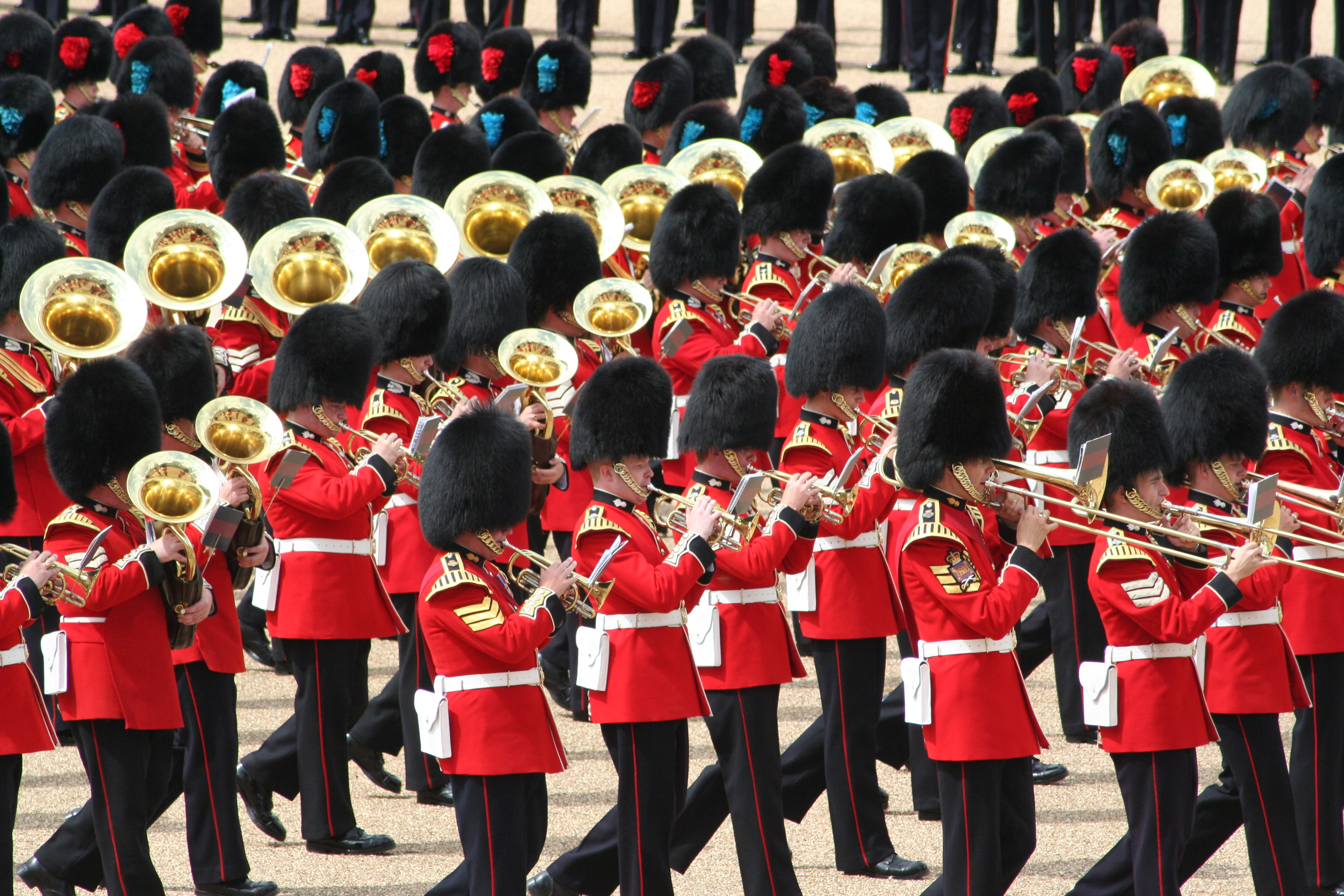
The Grenadier Guards band playing "The British Grenadiers" at Trooping the Colour. Formed in 1685 the band performs at British ceremonial events.

British Baroque music developed via wider European exchange, exemplified by George Frideric Handel, whose operas and chorals reshaped British musical and operatic culture. The Birmingham Triennial Music Festival, established in 1784 and continuing until 1912, contributed to the consolidation of British concert culture. The Philharmonic Society (1813), Royal Academy of Music (1822) and Irish Academy of Music (1848) helped establish an institutional infrastructure of professional performance, and academic music education. This expanded by the Glasgow Athenaeum, Trinity College of Music, Royal College of Music, Royal Manchester College of Music, the University of Oxford's music faculty, The Hallé and the Royal Scottish National Orchestra, alongside Royal Society of Musicians. British musical culture began to emerge from its dependence on the patronage of the royal court, aristocracy and church towards a commercial public sphere. At the same time, the Anglican choral tradition, helped expanding choral festival culture and hosted Handel's oratorios like the Messiah.

The Philharmonic Society was a strong supporter of the German Felix Mendelssohn, an early Romantic composer who also strongly influenced British music. In Ireland, John Field invented the nocturne and may have been an influence on Chopin and Liszt. A notable development of the mid- to late-nineteenth century was the resurgence of English-language opera and the establishment of several prominent orchestras, including the Royal Liverpool Philharmonic in 1840, Manchester-based Hallé in 1858, the Scottish Orchestra in 1891 and the City of Birmingham Symphony Orchestra in 1920. The most notable trend in classical music at the turn of the century was the nationalistic trend that developed. This was initially seen in works like The Masque at Kenilworth, which reconstructed an Elizabethan masque, but later took a pastoral turn under the influence of the British folk revival. Examplars of this period are Ralph Vaughan Williams' English Folk Song Suite, and Sir Alexander Mackenzie's Scottish Rhapsodies.

Modern and contemporary classical music takes a variety of forms. Composers such as Benjamin Britten developed idiosyncratic and avant-garde styles, while the likes of William Walton produced more conventional ceremonial and patriotic music. The UK now has several major orchestras, including the BBC Symphony Orchestra, and the Philharmonia, while the establishment of the Opera North in 1977 sought to redress the balance of operatic institutions away from London. There are several classical festivals, such as Aldeburgh and Glyndebourne, while the BBC Proms are an important annual fixture in the classical calendar.

==== Popular music ====
The Beatles are the most commercially successful and critically acclaimed band in popular music, with estimated sales of over one billion.

Popular commercial music in Britain can be traced back at least as far as the seventeenth-century broadside ballad, and also encompasses brass band music and music hall. Popular music in the modern sense began to emerge in the 1950s, as the American styles of jazz and rock and roll became popular. The skiffle revival was an early attempt to create a British form of American music, but it was the emergence of British rock and roll by the early 1960s that established a viable British popular music industry. Genres such as beat and British blues were re-exported to America by bands such as the Beatles and Rolling Stones, in a move that came to be called the British Invasion. The 1960s saw the development of heavy metal in Birmingham and the wider area. The development of blues rock helped differentiate rock and pop music, leading to the emergence of several sub-genres of rock in the 1970s. Glam rock was a particularly British genre that emphasised outrageous costumes, while the end of the decade saw the rise of punk, new wave, and post-punk bands. The influence of immigration could also be seen in the increased prominence of World music, particularly Jamaican music.

The 1980s were a successful decade in British pop, as a second British Invasion was witnessed and new technology enabled genres such as synthpop to form. Jazz saw a resurgence as black British musicians created new fusions such as Acid Jazz. Indie rock was a reaction to the perceived saturation of the music industry by pop, exemplified by Stock Aitken Waterman's domination of the charts. This continued in the 1990s, as boy bands, all-female and mixed groups dominated the singles chart, while the Madchester scene helped drive alternative rock and Britpop to the mainstream. British soul saw a rise that continued into the 2000s, including the global success of Adele. Dance music also saw innovation, with genres such as dubstep and new rave emerging.

==== Folk and sub-national music ====
Handel's "Arrival of the Queen of Sheba", from Solomon

"Hen Wlad Fy Nhadau (Land of My Fathers)"

"Auld Lang Syne"

In contrast to the comparatively homogeneous classical and pop genres, each nation of the UK has retained a distinct tradition of folk music. The traditional folk music of England has contributed to several genres, such as sea shanties, jigs, hornpipes and dance music. It has its own distinct variations and regional peculiarities, while musical Morris dancing is an English folk dance known to have existed at least as early as the mid-15th century.

The bagpipes have long been a national symbol of Scotland, and the Great Highland Bagpipe is widely recognised. The English and Scottish Popular Ballads, are ballads of the British Isles from the later medieval period until the 19th century, demonstrating great regional variety, particularly local traditions such as the Border ballads, which include the particularly influential Ballad of Chevy Chase. British folk groups, such as Fairport Convention, have drawn heavily from these ballads.

Similarly, while the national anthem "God Save the King" and other patriotic songs such as "Rule, Britannia!" represent the United Kingdom, each of the four individual countries of the UK has its own patriotic hymns. For example, Jerusalem, Flower of Scotland, Land of My Fathers, and Danny Boy pertain exclusively to England, Scotland, Wales, and Northern Ireland respectively. These songs are often used at sporting events where each nation competes individually.

=== Cinema ===
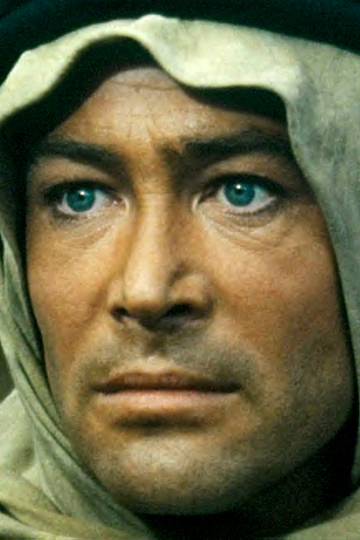
Peter O'Toole as T. E. Lawrence in David Lean's 1962 epic Lawrence of Arabia

Britain has had a significant film industry for over a century. While many films focus on British culture, British cinema is also marked by its interaction and competition with American and continental European cinema.

The UK was the location of the oldest surviving moving picture, Roundhay Garden Scene (1888), which was shot in Roundhay, Leeds by French inventor Louis Le Prince, while the first British film, Incident at Clovelly Cottage was shot in 1895. The world's first colour motion picture was shot by Edward Raymond Turner in 1902. British film production suffered in the 1920s in face of competition from American imports and a legal requirement for cinemas to show a set quota of British films, which encouraged poor-quality, low-cost productions to meet this demand. This had changed by the 1940s, when the government encouraged fewer, higher-quality films to be made. This era also saw the rise of Alfred Hitchcock, who soon moved to the US and become one of the twentieth century's most influential directors. During World War II the Crown Film Unit established a reputation for documentaries, while Powell and Pressburger began their influential and innovative collaboration.

The post-war period was a particular high point for British filmmaking, producing The Third Man and Brief Encounter, which the British Film Institute consider the best and second-best British films respectively. Laurence Olivier's 1948 Hamlet was the first British film to win the Academy Award for Best Picture. The 1950s saw a focus on popular domestic topics such as comedies, including the enduring Carry On series, and World War II epics such as The Dam Busters. At the end of the decade Hammer Films took advantage of relaxed censorship laws to begin their series of successful horror films. The beginning of the 1960s saw the British New Wave style develop, influenced by its French counterpart, that sought to depict a wider strata of society in a realistic manner. The 1960s also saw renewed American financial interest in British film, which particularly manifested itself in the development of historical epics, such as Best Picture winners Lawrence of Arabia and A Man for All Seasons; spy thrillers, including the first films in the James Bond franchise; and films based on 'swinging London' scene.

The 1970s saw a withdrawal of American support and a retrenchment in British cinema, though the decade did see culturally important productions such as the horror The Wicker Man and Monty Python's comedic films. The decade also saw the Commonwealth influence British film, as Pressure and A Private Enterprise are considered the first Black British and British Asian films respectively. 1981's Chariots of Fire and 1982's Gandhi both won the Best Picture Oscar, the latter winning eight awards, prompting a resurgence in period films. 1982 also saw the creation of Channel 4, which had a remit to promote films for minority audiences. Films with racial and LGBT themes were produced, while Channel 4's involvement saw television stars move into feature films.

American investment again increased in the 1990s, and the success of Four Weddings and a Funeral saw romantic comedies rise in popularity. Merchant Ivory Productions, boosted by the Oscars success of the previous decade's period pieces, continued to produce films in the same vein. American studios also began to base the production of Hollywood films in the UK, encouraged by tax incentives. 1996's Trainspotting led to increased interest in regional, particularly Scottish, cinema. While American-funded films continued their influence in the 2010s, domestic European co-productions also received acclaim. The Queen was British-French production for which Helen Mirren won Best Actress, while the UK Film Council funded The King's Speech, which won Best Picture in 2011. Asian British cinema has risen in prominence since 1999, when East Is East was a mainstream success on a low budget.

=== Broadcasting ===
Historically led by the taxpayer-funded BBC, the Public service broadcasting in the United Kingdom now includes major independent and satellite broadcasters like ITV, Channel 4, Five, and Sky UK. They operate as independent public service broadcasters, while BBC and Channel 4 provide mandated programming.

Launched in 1955, ITV is the oldest commercial television network in the UK. Director Ridley Scott's evocative 1973 Hovis bread television commercial captured the public imagination. Filmed on Gold Hill, Shaftesbury in Dorset, Scott's advert was voted the UK's favourite television advertisement of all time in 2006. Notable British commercials include British Airways' Face (1989), Guinness's noitulovE (2005), Cadbury's Gorilla (2007), and Galaxy's CGI Audrey Hepburn advertisement (2013). UK Christmas campaigns, such as the John Lewis Christmas advert.

International football tournaments have produced some of the UK's largest television audiences, while Match of the Day is a prominent weekly football programme. The 1966 FIFA World Cup final drew 32.30 million viewers and the funeral of Princess Diana 32.10 million, the UK's two most-watched television events. Satire has been a prominent feature in British comedy for centuries. The British satire boom of the 1960s, which consisted of writers and performers such as Peter Cook, Dudley Moore, Alan Bennett, David Frost and Jonathan Miller, has heavily influenced British television, including the sketch comedy series Monty Python's Flying Circus created in 1969 by Monty Python. Regarded as the leading figure of the satire boom, Peter Cook was ranked number one in the Comedians' Comedian poll. The puppet show Spitting Image was a satire of the royal family, politics, entertainment, sport and British culture of the 1980s up to the mid-1990s.

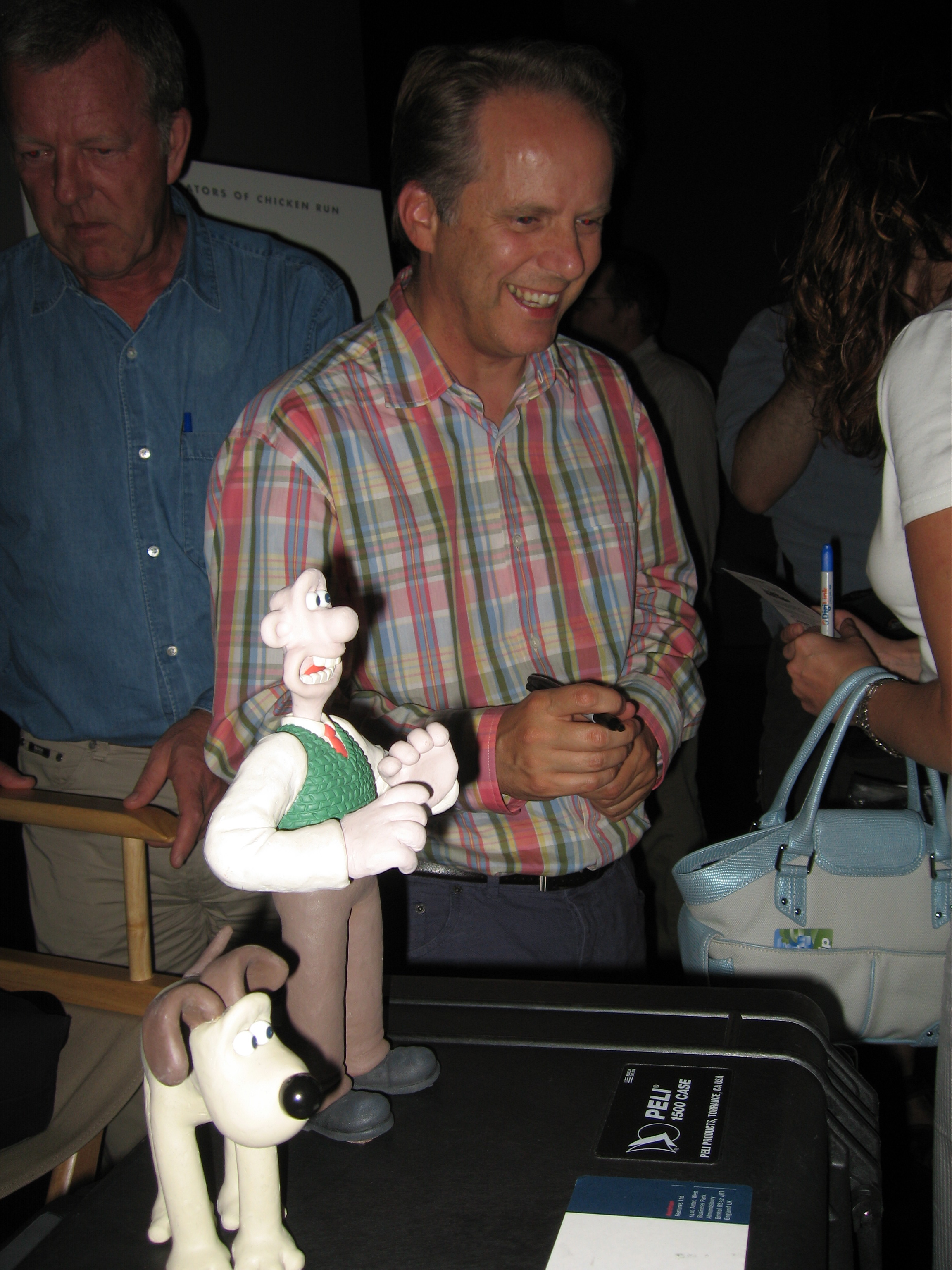
Animator Nick Park with his Wallace and Gromit characters

Have I Got News for You and Mock the Week are the two longest running satirical panel shows. Satire also features heavily in the Grand Theft Auto video game series which has been ranked among Britain's most successful exports. The slapstick and double entendre of Benny Hill also achieved very high ratings on British television, as did the physical humour of Mr. Bean. Popular comedy duos in television include The Two Ronnies and Morecambe and Wise, with both shows featuring memorable sketches. Jeeves and Wooster starred Hugh Laurie as Bertie Wooster, an airy, nonchalant, gormless, idle young gentleman and Stephen Fry as Jeeves, his calm, well-informed, and talented valet. Created by and starring Rik Mayall as Richie and Adrian Edmondson as Eddie, Bottom features two crude, perverted flatmates with no jobs and little money, which is noted for its chaotic, nihilistic humour and violent comedy slapstick. Steve Coogan created the character Alan Partridge, a tactless and inept television presenter who often insults his guests and whose inflated sense of celebrity drives him to shameless self-promotion. Da Ali G Show starred Sacha Baron Cohen as a faux-streetwise poseur Ali G from west London, who would conduct real interviews with unsuspecting people, many of whom are celebrities, during which they are asked absurd and ridiculous questions.

Animator Nick Park created the Wallace and Gromit characters at Aardman Animations studio in Bristol. They feature in A Grand Day Out (1989), The Wrong Trousers (1993) and A Close Shave (1995), which all have 100% positive ratings on the aggregation site Rotten Tomatoes, while A Matter of Loaf and Death was the most watched television programme in the UK in 2008. Aardman also produce the kid's show Shaun the Sheep. One of the most popular children's shows originating in the UK is Thomas & Friends (based on The Railway Series books by Wilbert Awdry), which has become the number one licensed preschool property in the world. Other popular children's shows include Postman Pat, Fireman Sam, Teletubbies, Bob the Builder and Peppa Pig.

First airing in 1958, Blue Peter is famous for its arts and crafts "makes". The show has been a staple for generations of British children. Popular live action TV shows include The Borrowers (based on Mary Norton books on little people), The Adventures of Black Beauty, The Famous Five (based on Enid Blyton books), The Lion, the Witch and the Wardrobe (based on the C. S. Lewis novel), and Pride and Prejudice (starring Colin Firth as Mr. Darcy). The actor David Jason has voiced a number of popular characters in children's animation, including The Wind in the Willows (based on the children's book by Kenneth Grahame), Danger Mouse and Count Duckula. Other children's shows include Where's Wally? (a series based on books by author Martin Handford where readers are challenged to find Wally who is hidden in the group), Dennis the Menace and Gnasher, while Thunderbirds and Terrahawks by Gerry and Sylvia Anderson have been praised for creating Supermarionation.

Debuting in 1982, The Snowman (featuring the festive song "Walking in the Air") is annually screened at Christmas. Shown on the BBC, the UK holds two high-profile charity telethon events, Children in Need, held annually in November, and Comic Relief, which alternates with Sports Relief, every March. The 2011 edition of Comic Relief saw the first appearance of James Corden's Carpool Karaoke sketch when he drove around London singing songs with George Michael. British programmes dominate the list of TV's most watched shows in the UK, with the kitchen sink dramas, ITV's Coronation Street and BBC's EastEnders, both often ranking high on the ratings list compiled by BARB. The major soap operas each feature a pub, and these pubs have become household names throughout the UK. The Rovers Return is the pub in Coronation Street, the Queen Vic (short for the Queen Victoria) is the pub in EastEnders, and the Woolpack in ITV's Emmerdale. The pub being a prominent setting in the three major television soap operas reflects the role pubs have as the focal point of the community in many towns and villages across the UK. Espionage and detective shows have long been a staple of British television, such as the 1960s series The Avengers featuring lady spy adventurer and cultural (and feminist) icon Emma Peel.

The United Kingdom has a large number of national and local radio stations which cover a great variety of programming. The most listened to stations are the five main national BBC Radio stations. BBC Radio 1, a new music station aimed at the 16–24 age group. BBC Radio 2, a varied popular music and chat station aimed at adults is consistently highest in the ratings. BBC Radio 4, a varied talk station, is noted for its news, current affairs, drama and comedy output as well as The Archers, its long running soap opera, and other unique programmes, including Desert Island Discs (1942–present), an interview programme in which a famous guest (called a "castaway") chooses eight pieces of music, a book and a luxury item that they would take with them to a desert island. Currently presented by Lauren Laverne, it is the longest running music radio programme in British history.

The idea for a Christmas message was conceived by one of the founders of the BBC. Delivered annually by the monarch, it was first broadcast on BBC Radio in 1932. An alternative Christmas message was first broadcast on Channel 4 in 1993. Broadcast from 1951 to 1960, radio comedy The Goon Show, starring Peter Sellers, Spike Milligan and Harry Secombe, mixed ludicrous plots with surreal humour, puns, catchphrases and an array of bizarre sound effects. The show has exerted considerable influence on British comedy and culture. As a film star Sellers in particular became influential to film actors by using different accents and guises and assuming multiple roles in the same film. Comedian Marty Feldman co-created the acclaimed BBC Radio comedy programme Round the Horne in 1965. The long running radio comedy Just a Minute first aired on BBC Radio 4 in 1967. Panellists must talk for sixty seconds on a given subject, "without hesitation, repetition or deviation". Guests over the years have included Stephen Fry, Eddie Izzard and Sue Perkins. First broadcast on BBC Radio 4 in 1978, the science fiction comedy radio series The Hitchhiker's Guide to the Galaxy was innovative in its use of music and sound effects. The BBC, as a public service broadcaster, also runs minority stations such as BBC Asian Network, BBC Radio 1Xtra and BBC Radio 6 Music, and local stations throughout the country. Rock music station Absolute Radio, and sports station Talksport, are among the biggest commercial radio stations in the UK.

- List of radio stations in the United Kingdom
- List of television stations in the United Kingdom

=== Print ===
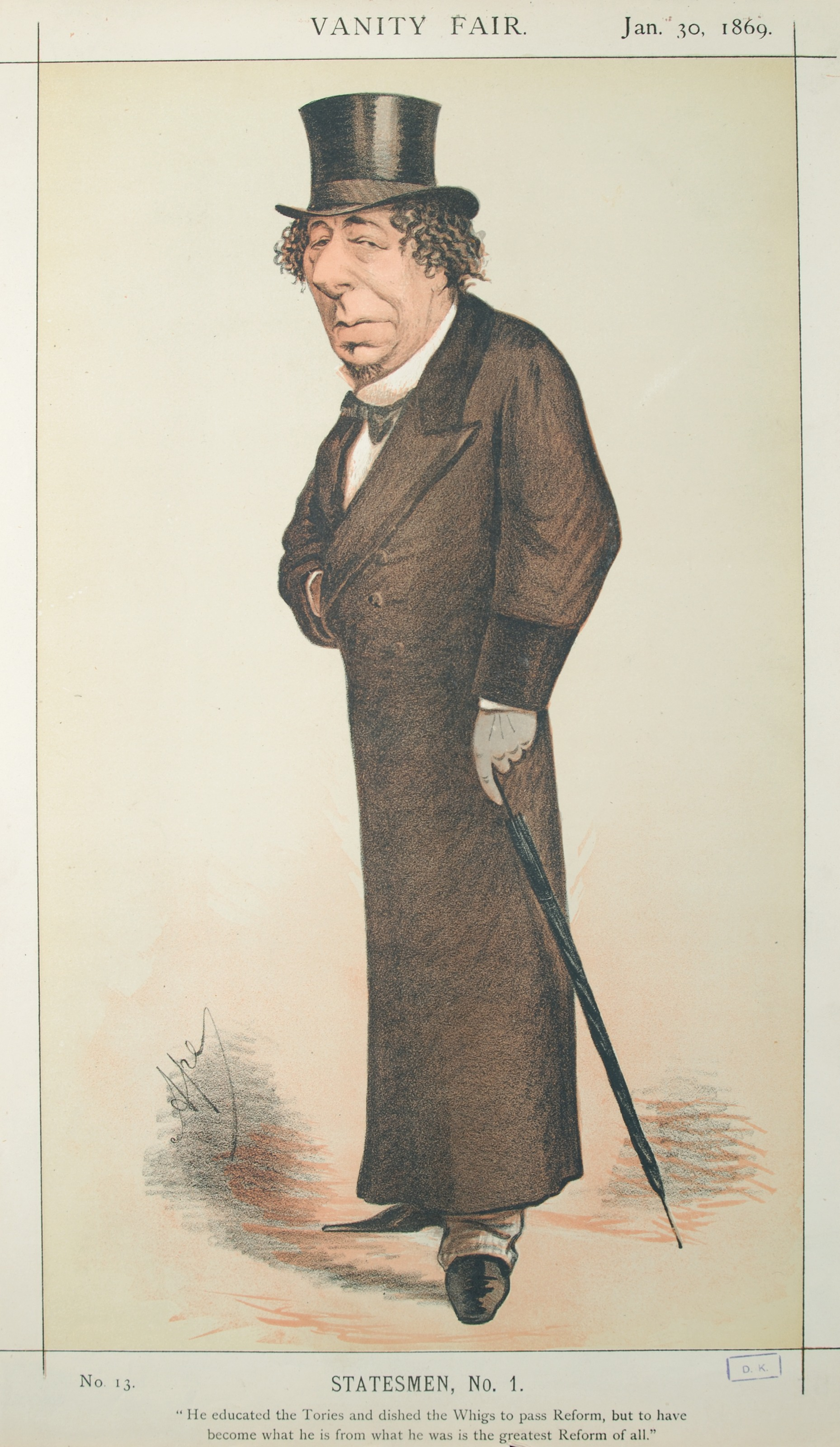
Caricature of British Prime Minister Benjamin Disraeli in Vanity Fair, 30 January 1869

Freedom of the press was established in Great Britain in 1695. Popular national newspapers include The Times, Financial Times, The Guardian, The Daily Telegraph and The Independent.

Founded by publisher John Walter in 1785, The Times is the first newspaper to have borne that name, lending it to numerous other papers around the world, and is the originator of the widely used Times Roman typeface, created by Victor Lardent and commissioned by Stanley Morison in 1931. Newspaper and publishing magnate Alfred Harmsworth played a major role in "shaping the modern press" – Harmsworth introduced or harnessed "broad contents, exploitation of advertising revenue to subsidize prices, aggressive marketing, subordinate regional markets, independence from party control" – and was called "the greatest figure who ever strode down Fleet Street." The Economist was founded by James Wilson in 1843, and the daily Financial Times was founded in 1888. Founding The Gentleman's Magazine in 1731, Edward Cave coined the term "magazine" for a periodical, and was the first publisher to successfully fashion a wide-ranging publication. Founded by Thomas Gibson Bowles, Vanity Fair featured caricatures of famous people for which it is best known today.

A pioneer of children's publishing, John Newbery made children's literature a sustainable and profitable part of the literary market. The History of Little Goody Two-Shoes was published by Newbery in 1765. Founded by Sir Allen Lane in 1935, Penguin Books revolutionised publishing in the 1930s through its inexpensive paperbacks, bringing high-quality paperback fiction and non-fiction to the mass market. Formed in 1940, Puffin Books is the children's imprint of Penguin Books. Barbara Euphan Todd's scarecrow story, Worzel Gummidge, was the first Puffin story book in 1941.

The Guinness Book of Records was the brainchild of Sir Hugh Beaver. On 10 November 1951 he became involved in an argument over which was the fastest game bird in Europe, and realised that it was impossible to confirm in reference books. Beaver knew that there must be numerous other questions debated throughout the world, but there was no book with which to settle arguments about records. He realised that a book supplying the answers to this sort of question might prove successful. His idea became reality when an acquaintance of his recommended University friends Norris and Ross McWhirter who were then commissioned to compile what became The Guinness Book of Records in August 1954. E. L. James' erotic romance trilogy Fifty Shades of Grey, Fifty Shades Darker, and Fifty Shades Freed, have sold over 125 million copies globally, and set the record in the United Kingdom as the fastest selling paperback.

Copyright laws originated in Britain with the Statute of Anne (also known as the Copyright Act 1709), which outlined the individual rights of the artist. A right to benefit financially from the work is articulated, and court rulings and legislation have recognised a right to control the work, such as ensuring that the integrity of it is preserved. The Statute of Anne gave the publishers rights for a fixed period, after which the copyright expired.

=== Visual arts ===
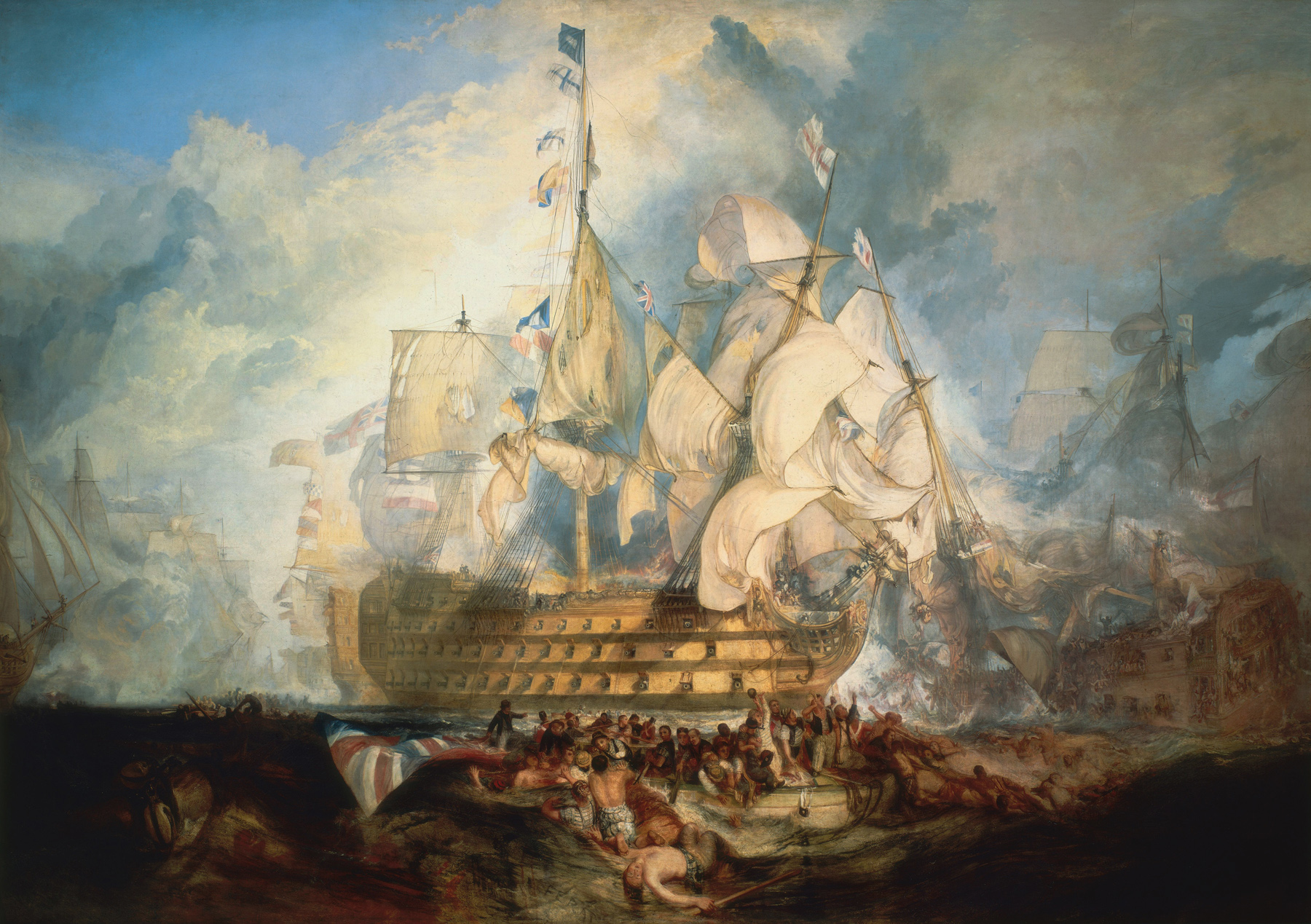
The Battle of Trafalgar is an oil painting executed in 1822 by J. M. W. Turner (c.1775–1851). The experience of military, political and economic power from the rise of the British Empire led to a very specific drive in artistic technique, taste and sensibility in the United Kingdom.

From the creation of the United Kingdom, the English school of painting is mainly notable for portraits and landscapes, and indeed portraits in landscapes. Among the artists of this period are Joshua Reynolds (1723–1792), George Stubbs (1724–1806), and Thomas Gainsborough (1727–1788).

Pictorial satirist William Hogarth pioneered Western sequential art, and political illustrations in this style are often referred to as "Hogarthian". Following the work of Hogarth, political cartoons developed in England in the latter part of the 18th century under the direction of James Gillray. Regarded as being one of the two most influential cartoonists (the other being Hogarth), Gillray has been referred to as the father of the political cartoon, with his satirical work calling the king (George III), prime ministers and generals to account.

The late 18th century and the early 19th century was perhaps the most radical period in British art, producing William Blake (1757–1827), John Constable (1776–1837) and J. M. W. Turner (1775–1851), three of the most influential British artists, each of whom have dedicated spaces allocated for their work at the Tate Britain. Named after Turner, the Turner Prize (created in 1984) is an annual award presented to a British visual artist under the age of 50.

The Pre-Raphaelite Brotherhood (PRB) achieved considerable influence after its foundation in 1848 with paintings that concentrated on religious, literary, and genre subjects executed in a colourful and minutely detailed style. PRB artists included John Everett Millais, Dante Gabriel Rossetti and subsequently Edward Burne-Jones. Also associated with it was the designer William Morris, whose efforts to make beautiful objects affordable (or even free) for everyone led to his wallpaper and tile designs to some extent defining the Victorian aesthetic and instigating the Arts and Crafts movement.

Visual artists from the UK in the 20th century include Lucian Freud, Francis Bacon, David Hockney, Bridget Riley, and the pop artists Richard Hamilton and Peter Blake. Also prominent amongst 20th-century artists was Henry Moore, regarded as the voice of British sculpture, and of British modernism in general. Sir Jacob Epstein was a pioneer of modern sculpture. In 1958 artist Gerald Holtom designed the protest logo for the British Campaign for Nuclear Disarmament (CND), the peace movement in the UK, which became a universal peace symbol. As a reaction to abstract expressionism, pop art emerged in England at the end of the 1950s. The 1990s saw the Young British Artists, Damien Hirst and Tracey Emin.

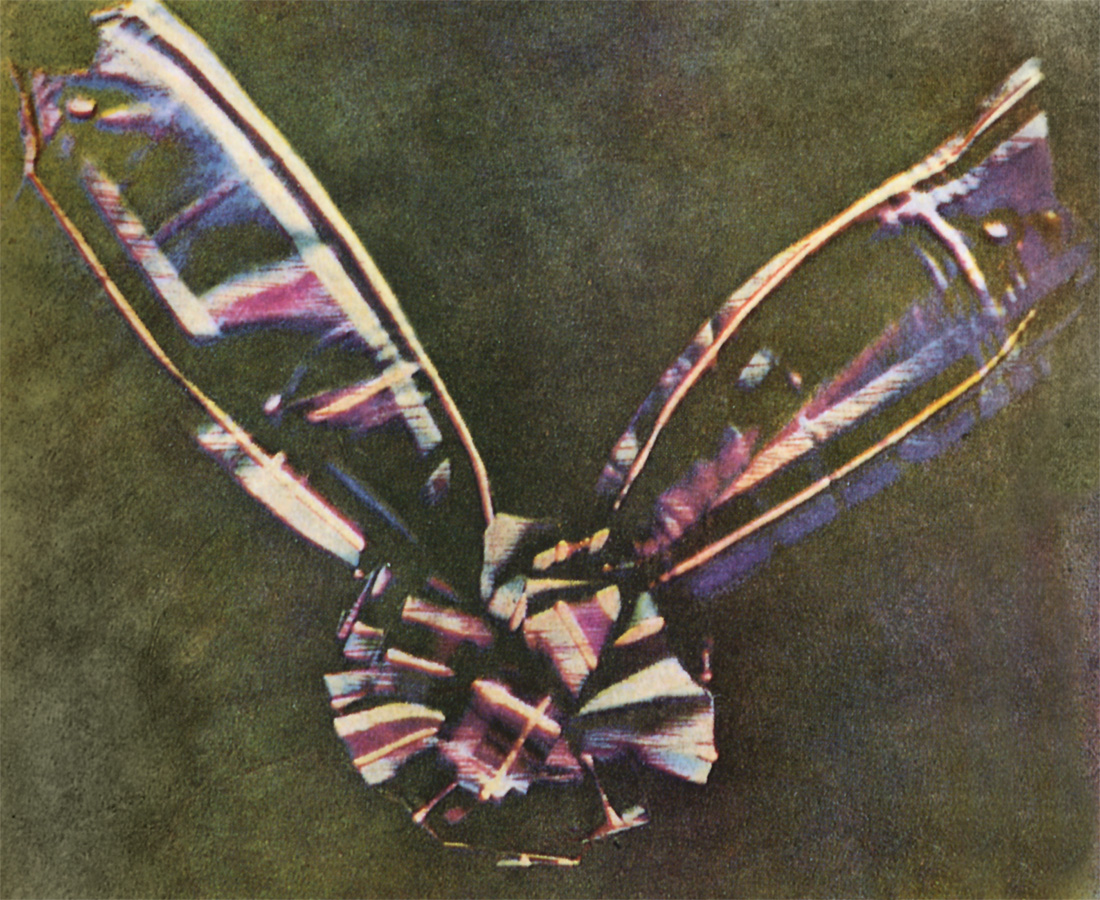
The first colour photograph in 1861. Produced by the three-colour method suggested by James Clerk Maxwell in 1855, it is the foundation of all colour photographic processes.

The auction was revived in 17th- and 18th-century England when auctions by candle began to be used for the sale of goods and leaseholds, some of which were recorded in Samuel Pepys's diary in 1660. Headquartered in King Street, London, Christie's, the world's largest auction house, was founded in 1766 by auctioneer James Christie in London. Known for his thickly impasted portrait and figure paintings, Lucian Freud was widely considered the pre-eminent British artist of his time. Freud was depicted in Francis Bacon's 1969 oil painting, Three Studies of Lucian Freud, which was sold for $142.4 million in November 2013, the highest price attained at auction to that point.

Randolph Caldecott, Walter Crane, Kate Greenaway, John Tenniel, Aubrey Beardsley, Roger Hargreaves, Arthur Rackham, John Leech, George Cruikshank and Beatrix Potter were notable book illustrators. Posters have played a significant role in British culture. Designed by Alfred Leete in 1914 as a recruitment poster for the British Army, "Lord Kitchener Wants You" is the most famous British recruitment poster ever produced and an iconic and enduring image of World War I. Produced by the British government in 1939 for World War II, the Keep Calm and Carry On motivational poster is now seen as "not only as a distillation of a crucial moment in Britishness, but also as an inspiring message from the past to the present in a time of crisis".

In the late 1960s, British graphic designer Storm Thorgerson co-founded the graphic art group Hipgnosis, who have designed many iconic single and album covers for rock bands. His works were notable for their surreal elements, with perhaps the most famous being the cover for Pink Floyd's The Dark Side of the Moon. Designed and photographed by Brian Duffy, the Aladdin Sane album cover features a lightning bolt across his face which is regarded as one of the most iconic images of David Bowie. The subversive political artwork of Banksy (pseudonym of English graffiti artist whose identity is concealed) can be found on streets, walls and buildings in the UK and the rest of the world. Arts institutions include the Royal College of Art, Royal Society of Arts, New English Art Club, Slade School of Art, Royal Academy, and the Tate Gallery (founded as the National Gallery of British Art).

Design

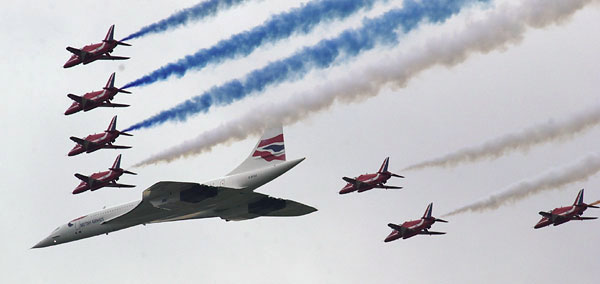
Concorde (and the Red Arrows with their trail of red, white and blue smoke) mark the Queen's Golden Jubilee. With its slender delta wings Concorde won the public vote for best British design.

In 2006, 37 years after its first test flight, Concorde was named the winner of the Great British Design Quest organised by the BBC and the Design Museum. A total of 212,000 votes were cast with Concorde beating other British design icons such as the Mini, mini skirt, Jaguar E-Type, Tube map and the Supermarine Spitfire.

Sir Morien Morgan led research into supersonic transport in 1948 that culminated in the Concorde passenger aircraft. In November 1956 he became chairman of the newly formed Supersonic Transport Aircraft Committee which funded research into supersonic transport at several British aviation firms though the 1950s. By the late 1950s, the committee had started the process of selecting specific designs for development, and after the forced merger of most aviation firms in 1960, selected the Bristol Type 223, designed by Archibald Russell, as the basis for a transatlantic design.

The Brit Awards statuette for the BPI's annual music awards, which depicts Britannia, the female personification of Britain, is regularly redesigned by some of the best known British designers, stylists and artists, including Dame Vivienne Westwood, Damien Hirst, Tracey Emin, Sir Peter Blake, Zaha Hadid and Sir Anish Kapoor.

=== Performing arts, carnivals, parades ===
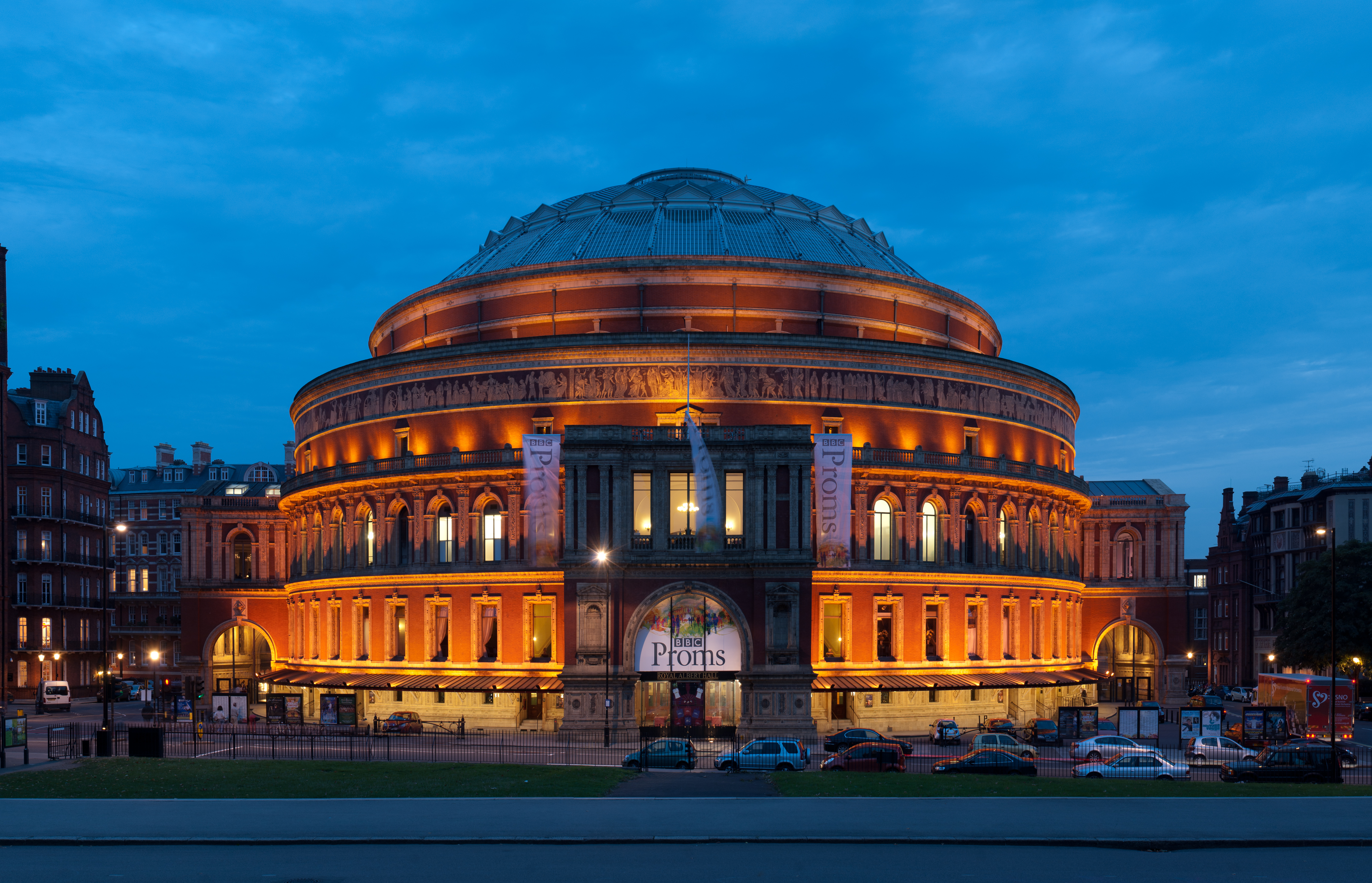
The Proms are held annually at the Royal Albert Hall during the summer. Regular performers at the Albert Hall include Eric Clapton who has played at the venue over 200 times.

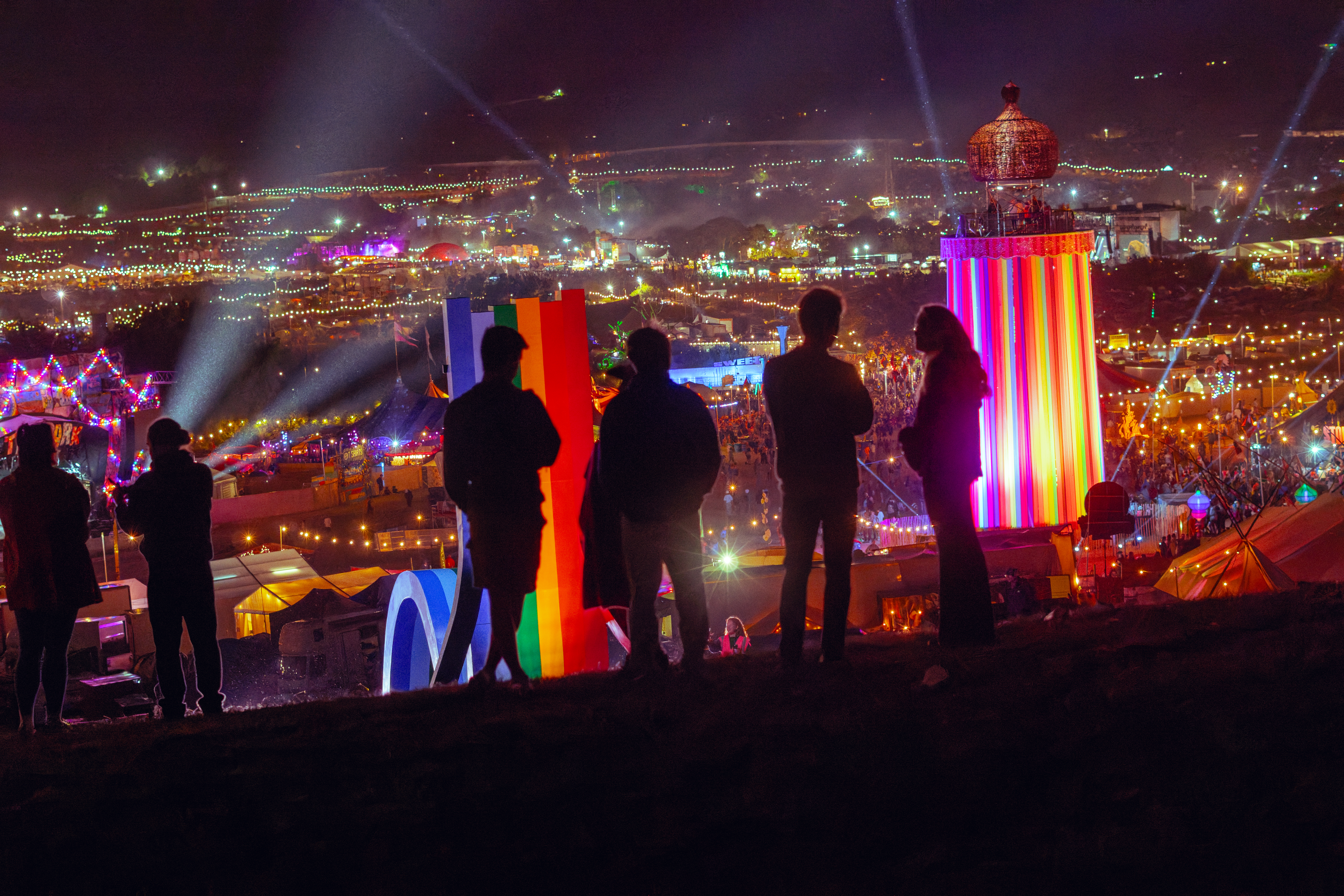
The Glastonbury Festival at night in 2025. The festival has an average daily attendance of 175,000 people with millions more watching live on BBC.

Large outdoor music festivals in the summer and autumn are popular, such as Glastonbury (the largest greenfield festival in the world), V Festival, Reading and Leeds Festivals. The UK was at the forefront of the illegal, free rave movement from the late 1980s, which led to pan-European culture of teknivals mirrored on the British free festival movement and associated travelling lifestyle. The most prominent opera house in England is the Royal Opera House at Covent Gardens. The Proms, a season of orchestral classical music concerts held at the Royal Albert Hall, is a major cultural event held annually. The Royal Ballet is one of the world's foremost classical ballet companies, its reputation built on two prominent figures of 20th-century dance, prima ballerina Margot Fonteyn and choreographer Frederick Ashton. Irish dancing is popular in Northern Ireland and among the Irish diaspora throughout the UK; its costumes feature patterns taken from the medieval Book of Kells.

A staple of British seaside culture, the quarrelsome couple Punch and Judy made their first recorded appearance in Covent Garden, London in 1662. The various episodes of Punch and Judy are performed in the spirit of outrageous comedy – often provoking shocked laughter – and are dominated by the anarchic clowning of Mr. Punch. Regarded as British cultural icons, they appeared at a significant period in British history, with Glyn Edwards stating: "[Pulcinella] went down particularly well with Restoration British audiences, fun-starved after years of Puritanism. We soon changed Punch's name, transformed him from a marionette to a hand puppet, and he became, really, a spirit of Britain – a subversive maverick who defies authority, a kind of puppet equivalent to our political cartoons."

The circus is a traditional form of entertainment in the UK. Chipperfield's Circus dates back more than 300 years in Britain, making it one of the oldest family circus dynasties. Philip Astley is regarded as the father of the modern circus. Following his invention of the circus ring in 1768, Astley's Amphitheatre opened in London in 1773. As an equestrian master Astley had a skill for trick horse-riding, and when he added tumblers, tightrope-walkers, jugglers, performing dogs, and a clown to fill time between his own demonstrations – the modern circus was born. The Hughes Royal Circus was popular in London in the 1780s. Pablo Fanque's Circus Royal, among the most popular circuses of Victorian England, showcased William Kite, which inspired John Lennon to write "Being for the Benefit of Mr. Kite!" on The Beatles' album Sgt. Pepper's Lonely Hearts Club Band. Joseph Grimaldi, originator of whiteface clown make-up, is considered the father of modern clowning.

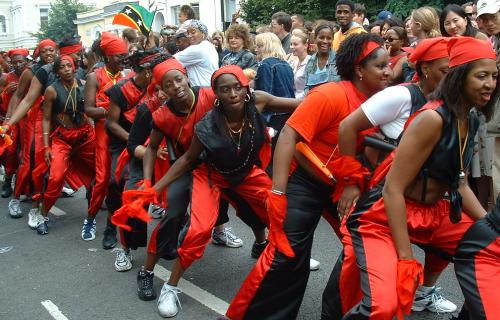
The Notting Hill Carnival is Britain's biggest street festival. Led by members of the British African-Caribbean community, the annual carnival takes place in August and lasts three days.

The Edinburgh Festival Fringe is the world's largest arts festival. Established in 1947, it takes place in Scotland's capital during three weeks every August alongside several other arts and cultural festivals. The Fringe mostly attracts events from the performing arts, particularly theatre and comedy, although dance and music also feature. The Notting Hill Carnival is an annual event that has taken place on the streets of Notting Hill, London since 1966. Led by the British African-Caribbean community, the carnival has attracted around one million people, making it Britain's biggest street festival and one of the largest in the world. Also of note is the extensive impact of Irish culture for St. Patrick's Day. The largest St Patrick's Day Parade takes place in Digbeth, Birmingham, where there is a strong Irish community.

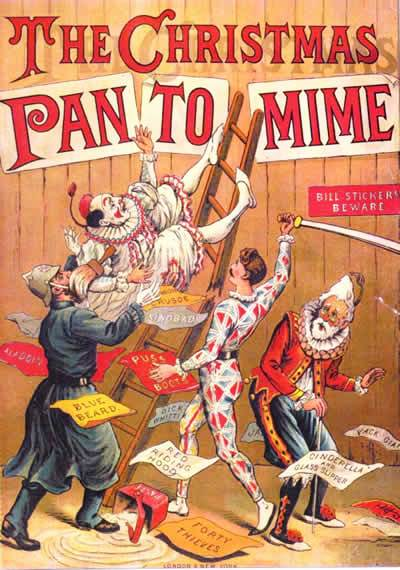
The Christmas Pantomime 1890. Pantomime plays a prominent role in British culture during the Christmas and New Year season.

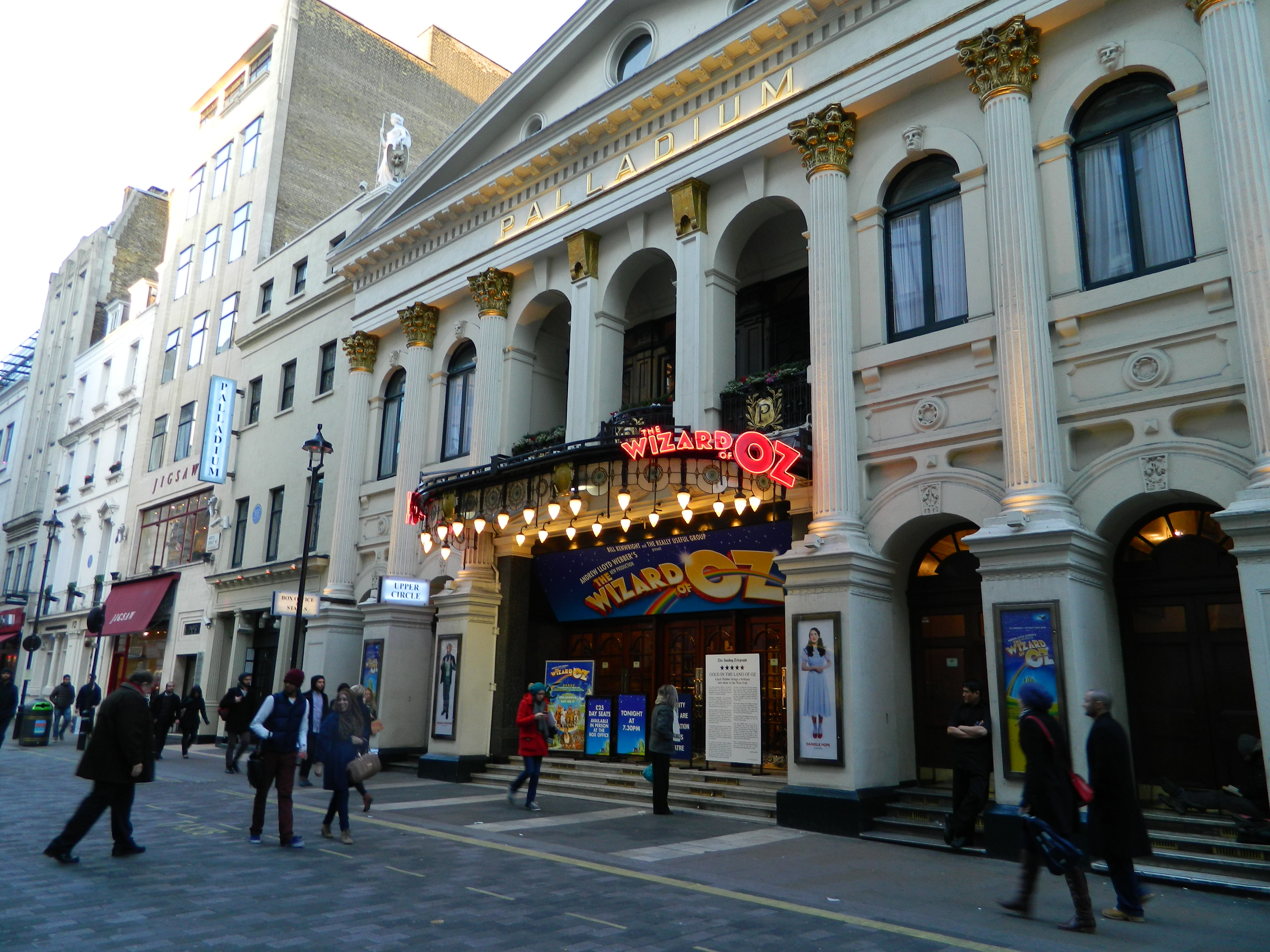
Music hall evolved into variety shows. First performed in 1912, the Royal Variety Performance was first held at the London Palladium (pictured) in 1941. Performed in front of members of the Royal Family, it is held annually in December and broadcast on television.

Pantomime (often referred to as "panto") is a British musical comedy stage production, designed for family entertainment. It is performed in theatres throughout the UK during the Christmas and New Year season. The art originated in the 18th century with John Weaver, a dance master and choreographer at the Theatre Royal, Drury Lane in London. In 19th-century England it acquired its present form, which includes songs, slapstick comedy and dancing, employing gender-crossing actors, combining topical humour with a story loosely based on a well-known fairy tale. It is a participatory form of theatre, in which the audience sing along with parts of the music and shout out phrases to the performers, such as "It's behind you".

Pantomime story lines and scripts are almost always based on traditional children's stories: some of the popular British stories featured include Jack and the Beanstalk, Peter Pan, Babes in the Wood, Goldilocks and the Three Bears and Dick Whittington and His Cat. Plot lines are almost always adapted for comic or satirical effect, and characters and situations from other stories are often interpolated into the plot. For example, Jack and the Beanstalk might include references to English nursery rhymes involving characters called "Jack", such as Jack and Jill. Famous people regularly appear in Pantos, such as Ian McKellen. McKellen has also appeared at gay pride marches, with Manchester Pride one of 15 annual gay pride parades in the UK; the largest in Brighton attracts over 300,000.

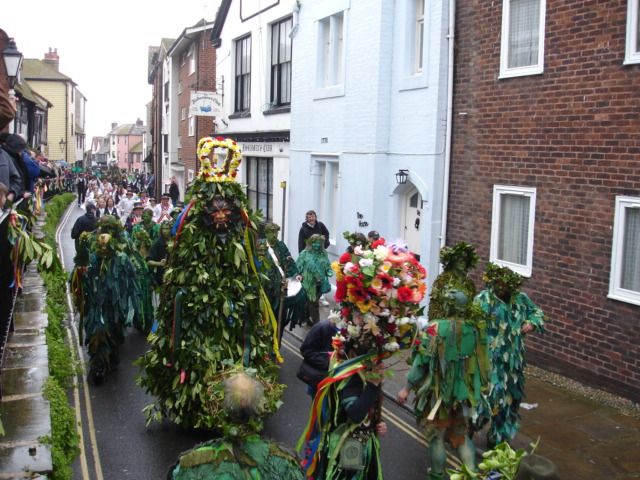
Jack in the Green, a traditional English folk custom being celebrated in Hastings Old Town, known for its many historic buildings.

Music hall is a British theatrical entertainment popular from the early Victorian era to the mid-20th century. The precursor to variety shows of today, music hall involved a mixture of popular songs, comedy, speciality acts and variety entertainment. Music hall songs include "I'm Henery the Eighth, I Am", "Hokey cokey", "I Do Like to Be Beside the Seaside" and "The Laughing Policeman". British performers who honed their skills at pantomime and music hall sketches include Charlie Chaplin, Stan Laurel, George Formby, Gracie Fields, Dan Leno, Gertrude Lawrence, Marie Lloyd and Harry Champion. British music hall comedian and theatre impresario Fred Karno developed a form of sketch comedy without dialogue in the 1890s, and Chaplin and Laurel were notable music hall comedians who worked for him. Laurel stated, "Fred Karno didn't teach Charlie [Chaplin] and me all we know about comedy. He just taught us most of it". Film producer Hal Roach stated; "Fred Karno is not only a genius, he is the man who originated slapstick comedy. We in Hollywood owe much to him." Examples of variety shows that evolved from the music hall include the Royal Variety Performance (first performed in 1912), which was broadcast on BBC radio from the 1920s, and then on television since the 1950s. Annually held in December (often at the London Palladium) and performed in front of members of the British royal family, many famous acts have performed at the Royal Variety show over the century, and since 2007 one act of the show has been selected by the British public through the ITV television talent show Britain's Got Talent.

=== Architecture ===
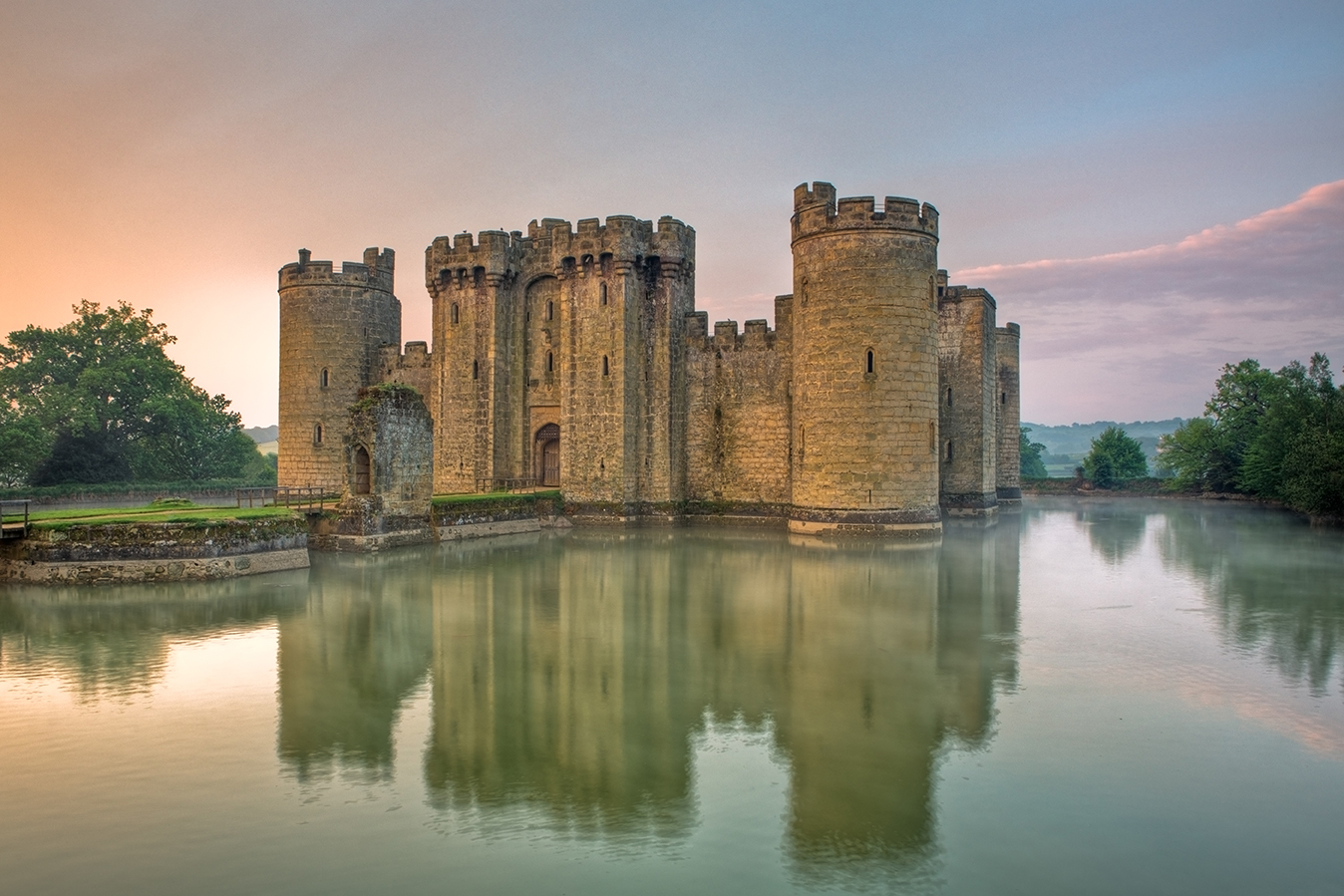
Bodiam Castle is a 14th-century moated castle in East Sussex. Today there are thousands of castles throughout the UK.

The architecture of the United Kingdom includes many features that precede the creation of the United Kingdom in 1707, from as early as Skara Brae and Stonehenge to the Giant's Ring, Avebury and Roman ruins. In most towns and villages the parish church is an indication of the age of the settlement. Many castles remain from the medieval period, such as Windsor Castle (longest-occupied castle in Europe), Stirling Castle (one of the largest and most important in Scotland), Bodiam Castle (a moated castle), and Warwick Castle. Over the two centuries following the Norman conquest of England of 1066, and the building of the Tower of London, castles such as Caernarfon Castle in Wales and Carrickfergus Castle in Ireland were built.

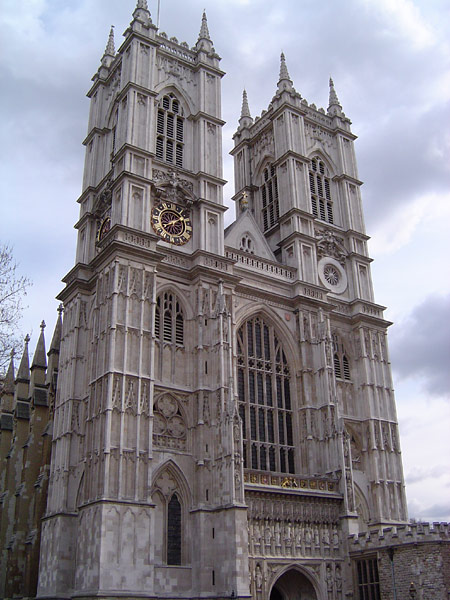
Westminster Abbey is an example of English Gothic architecture. Since 1066, when William the Conqueror was crowned, the coronations of British monarchs have been held here.

English Gothic architecture flourished from the 12th to the early 16th century, and famous examples include Westminster Abbey, the traditional place of coronation for the British monarch, which also has a long tradition as a venue for royal weddings; and was the location of the funeral of Princess Diana, Canterbury Cathedral, one of the oldest and most famous Christian structures in England; Salisbury Cathedral, which has the tallest church spire in the UK; and Winchester Cathedral, which has the longest nave and greatest overall length of any Gothic cathedral in Europe. Tudor architecture is the final development of Medieval architecture in England, during the Tudor period (1485–1603). In the United Kingdom, a listed building is a building or other structure officially designated as being of special architectural, historical or cultural significance. About half a million buildings in the UK have "listed" status.

In the 1680s, Downing Street was built by Sir George Downing, and its most famous address 10 Downing Street, became the residence of the Prime Minister in 1730. One of the best-known English architects working at the time of the foundation of the United Kingdom was Sir Christopher Wren. He was employed to design and rebuild many of the ruined ancient churches of London following the Great Fire of London. His masterpiece, St Paul's Cathedral, was completed in the early years of the United Kingdom. Buckingham Palace, the London residence of the British monarch, was built in 1705. Both St Paul's Cathedral and Buckingham Palace use Portland stone, a limestone from the Jurassic period quarried in the Jurassic Coast in Portland, Dorset, which is famous for its use in British and world architecture.

In the early 18th century Baroque architecture – popular in Europe – was introduced, and Blenheim Palace was built in this era. However, Baroque was quickly replaced by a return of the Palladian form. The Georgian architecture of the 18th century was an evolved form of Palladianism. Many existing buildings such as Woburn Abbey and Kedleston Hall are in this style. Among the many architects of this form of architecture and its successors, neoclassical and romantic, were Robert Adam, Sir William Chambers, and James Wyatt.

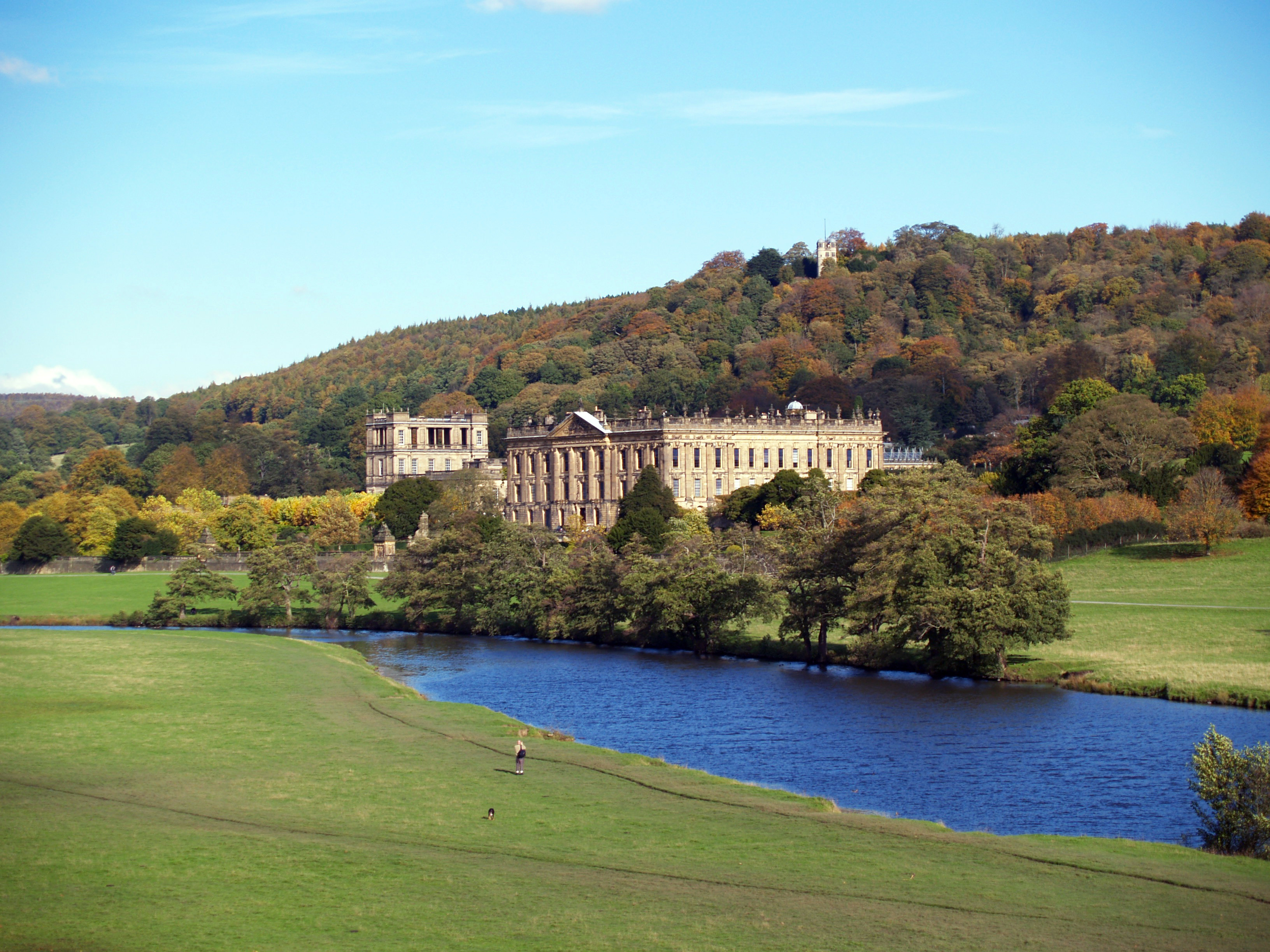
One of the UK's many stately homes, Chatsworth House in Derbyshire, surrounded by an English garden. The house is one of the settings of Jane Austen's novel Pride and Prejudice.

The aristocratic stately home continued the tradition of the first large gracious unfortified mansions such as the Elizabethan Montacute House and Hatfield House. Many of these houses are the setting for British period dramas, such as Downton Abbey. During the 18th and 19th centuries in the highest echelons of British society, the English country house was a place for relaxing, hunting in the countryside. Many stately homes have become open to the public: Knebworth House, now a major venue for open air rock and pop concerts – Freddie Mercury's final live performance with Queen took place at Knebworth on 9 August 1986, Alton Towers, the most popular theme park in the UK, and Longleat, the world's first safari park outside Africa.

The Forth Railway Bridge is a cantilever bridge over the Firth of Forth in the east of Scotland. It was opened in 1890, and is designated as a Category A listed building.

In the early 19th century the romantic Gothic revival began in England as a reaction to the symmetry of Palladianism. Notable examples of Gothic revival architecture are the Houses of Parliament and Fonthill Abbey. By the middle of the 19th century, as a result of new technology, one could incorporate steel as a building component: one of the greatest exponents of this was Joseph Paxton, architect of the Crystal Palace. Paxton also built such houses as Mentmore Towers, in the still popular retrospective Renaissance styles. In this era of prosperity and development British architecture embraced many new methods of construction, but such architects as August Pugin ensured that traditional styles were retained.

Following the building of the world's first seaside pier in July 1814 in Ryde, Isle of Wight off the south coast of England, the pier became fashionable at seaside resorts in the UK during the Victorian era, peaking in the 1860s with 22 being built. Providing a walkway out to sea, the seaside pier is regarded as among the finest Victorian architecture, and is an iconic symbol of the British seaside holiday. By 1914, there were over 100 piers around the UK's coasts. Today there are 55 seaside piers in the UK. Tower Bridge (half a mile from London Bridge) opened in 1895.

At the beginning of the 20th century a new form of design, arts and crafts, became popular; the architectural form of this style, which had evolved from the 19th-century designs of such architects as George Devey, was championed by Edwin Lutyens. Arts and crafts in architecture is characterised by an informal, non-symmetrical form, often with mullioned or lattice windows, multiple gables and tall chimneys. This style continued to evolve until World War II. After that war, reconstruction went through a variety of phases, but was heavily influenced by Modernism, especially from the late 1950s to the early 1970s. Many bleak town centre redevelopments—criticised for featuring hostile, concrete-lined "windswept plazas"—were the fruit of this interest, as were many equally bleak public buildings, such as the Hayward Gallery.

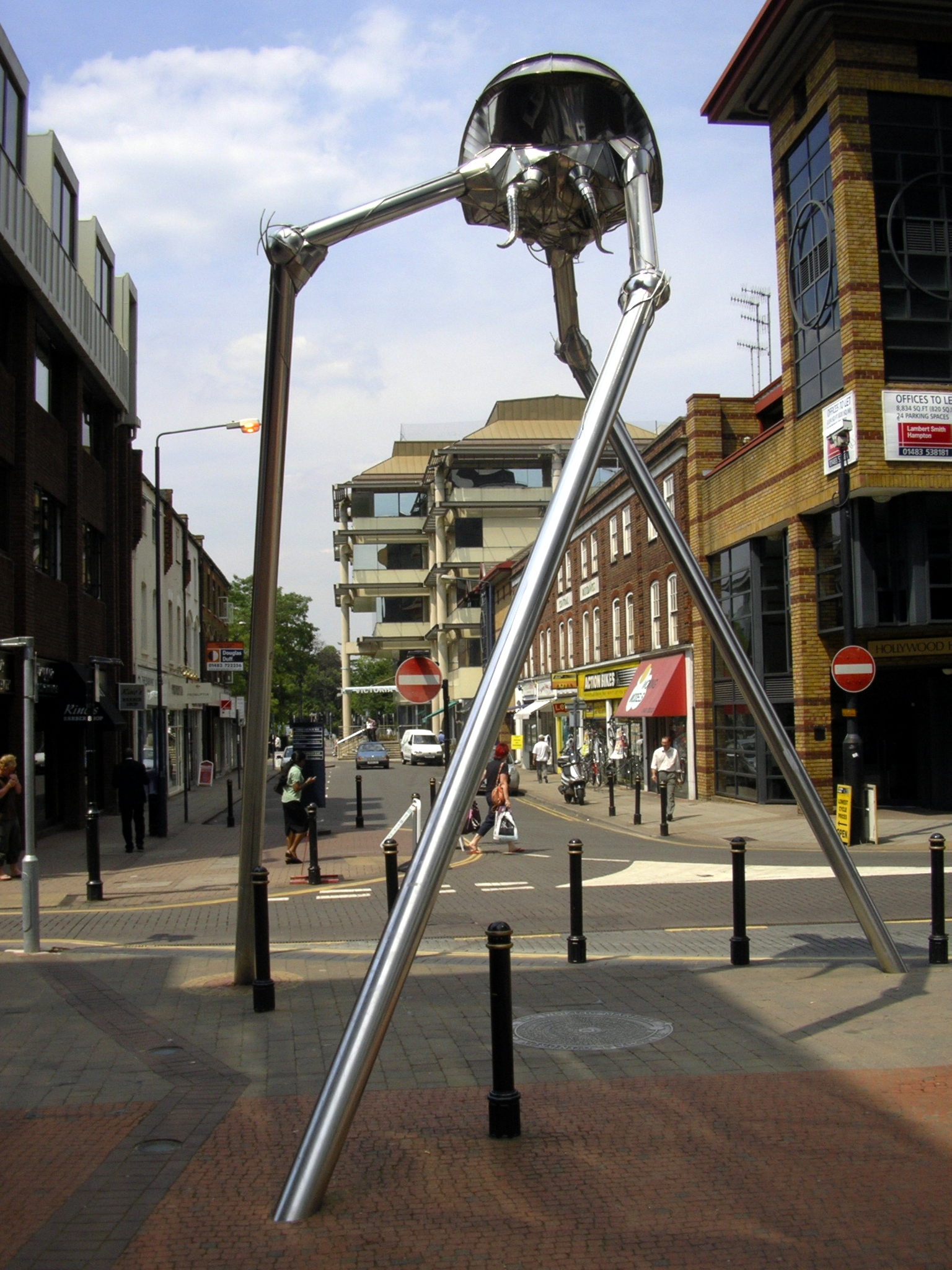
Statue of a tripod from The War of the Worlds in Woking, England, the hometown of author H. G. Wells. The book is a seminal depiction of a conflict between mankind and an extraterrestrial race.

Many Modernist-inspired town centres are today being redeveloped: Bracknell town centre is an example. However, in the immediate post-War years many thousands (perhaps hundreds of thousands) of council houses in vernacular style were built, giving working-class people their first experience of private gardens and indoor sanitation. Many towns also feature statues or sculptures dedicated to famous natives. Modernism remains a significant force in British architecture, although its influence is felt predominantly in commercial buildings. The two most prominent proponents are Lord Rogers of Riverside and Norman Foster. Rogers' best known London buildings are probably Lloyd's Building and the Millennium Dome, while Foster created the 'Gherkin' and the City Hall. The Turner Prize winning artist Sir Anish Kapoor is an acclaimed contemporary British sculptors. A notable design is his ArcelorMittal Orbit sculpture at the Olympic Park in London. The Shard London Bridge is the tallest building in the UK, designed by Italian architect Renzo Piano. Other major skyscrapers under construction in London include 22 Bishopsgate, and Heron Tower. Modernist architect Nicholas Grimshaw designed the Eden Project in Cornwall, which is the world's largest greenhouse.

=== Comics ===
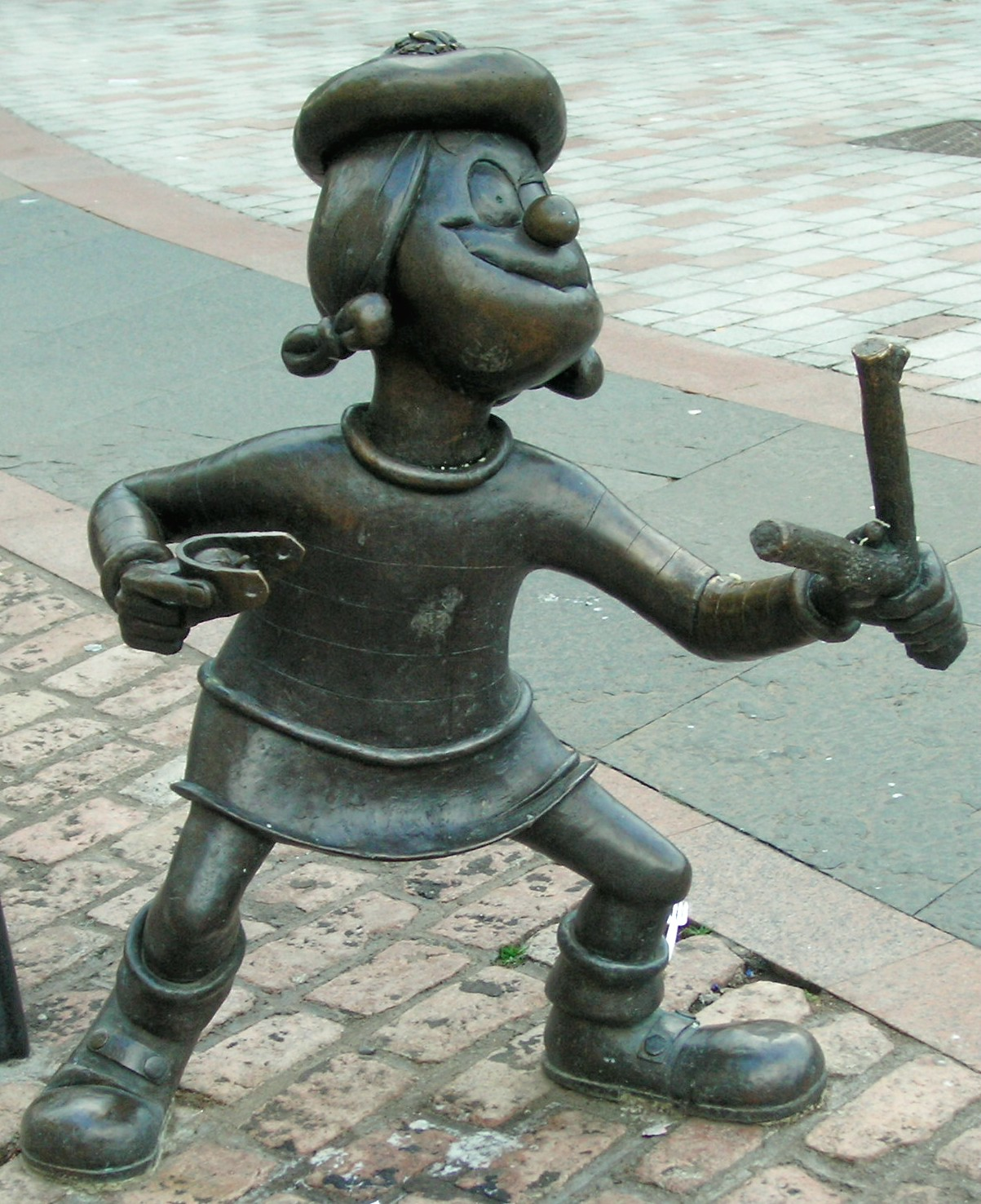
Statue of Minnie the Minx, a character from The Beano, in Dundee, Scotland. Launched in 1938, The Beano is known for its anarchic humour, with Dennis the Menace appearing on the cover.

British comics in the early 20th century typically evolved from illustrated penny dreadfuls of the Victorian era (featuring Sweeney Todd, Dick Turpin and Varney the Vampire). A growing consumer culture and an increased capacity for travel throughout the UK via the invention of railway (in 1825) created both a market for cheap popular literature, and the ability for it to be circulated on a large scale. Created in the 1830s, The Guardian described penny dreadfuls as "Britain's first taste of mass-produced popular culture for the young". Introducing familiar features in vampire fiction, Varney is the first story to refer to sharpened teeth for a vampire. After adult comics had been published – most notably Ally Sloper's Half Holiday (1880s) featuring Ally Sloper who has been called the first regular character in comics, – more juvenile British comics emerged, with the two most popular, The Beano and The Dandy, released by DC Thomson (based in Dundee, Scotland) in the 1930s. By 1950 the weekly circulation of both reached two million. Explaining the popularity of comics during this period, Anita O'Brien, director curator at London's Cartoon Museum, states: "When comics like the Beano and Dandy were invented back in the 1930s – and through really to the 1950s and 1960s – these comics were almost the only entertainment available to children."

In 1954 Tiger comics introduced Roy of the Rovers, the hugely popular football based strip recounting the life of Roy Race and the team he played for, Melchester Rovers. The stock media phrase "real 'Roy of the Rovers' stuff" is often used by football writers, commentators and fans when describing displays of great skill, or surprising results that go against the odds, in reference to the dramatic storylines that were the strip's trademark. Other comic books, graphic novels, and sequential art of various genres also flourished. These included fantasy and science fiction like Eagle, Valiant, Warrior, and 2000 AD. Other popular titles were war comics inspired by British military history like Commando, War Picture Library, and The Victor.

Created by Emma Orczy in 1903, the Scarlet Pimpernel is the alter ego of Sir Percy Blakeney, a wealthy English fop who transforms into a formidable swordsman and a quick-thinking escape artist, establishing the "hero with a secret identity" into popular culture. The Scarlet Pimpernel first appeared on stage (1903) and then in novel (1905), and became very popular with the British public. He exhibits characteristics that became standard superhero conventions in comic books, including the penchant for disguise, use of a signature weapon (sword), ability to out-think and outwit his adversaries, and a calling card (he leaves behind a scarlet pimpernel at his interventions). Drawing attention to his alter ego Blakeney he hides behind his public face as a meek, slow thinking foppish playboy, and he establishes a network of supporters, The League of the Scarlet Pimpernel, that aid his endeavours.

In the 1980s, a resurgence of British writers and artists gained prominence in mainstream comic books, which was dubbed the "British Invasion" in comic book history. These writers and artists brought with them their own mature themes and philosophy such as anarchy, controversy and politics common in British media, but were never before seen in American comics. These elements would pave the way for mature and "darker and edgier" comic books that would jump start the Modern Age of Comics. Writers included Alan Moore, famous for his V for Vendetta, From Hell, Watchmen, Marvelman, and The League of Extraordinary Gentlemen; Watchmen was described as "paving the way for a current cultural obsession" in comics; Neil Gaiman and his critically acclaimed and best-selling The Sandman mythos and Books of Magic; Warren Ellis creator of Transmetropolitan and Planetary; and others such as Alan Grant, Grant Morrison, Dave Gibbons, Alan Davis, and Mark Millar who created Wanted and Kick-Ass.

Prominent comic book artists include Steve Dillon, Simon Bisley, Dave McKean, Glen Fabry, John Ridgway and Sean Phillips. The comic book series Hellblazer, set in Britain and starring the Liverpudlian magician John Constantine, paved the way for British writers such as Jamie Delano, Mike Carey and Denise Mina.

== Folklore ==
=== Robin Hood and the ballad tradition ===
Much of the folklore of the United Kingdom pre-dates the 18th century. Though some of the characters and stories are present throughout all of the UK, most belong to specific countries or regions. Common folkloric beings include pixies, giants, elves, bogeymen, trolls, goblins and dwarves. While many legends and folk-customs are thought to be ancient, such as the tales of Offa of Angeln and Weyland Smith, others date from after the Norman invasion of England, such as Robin Hood and his Merry Men of Sherwood and their battles with the Sheriff of Nottingham. Richard the Lionheart, Christian leader of the Third Crusade, came to be seen as a contemporary and supporter of Robin Hood. A plaque features Richard marrying Robin and Maid Marian outside Nottingham Castle.

During the High Middle Ages tales originated from Brythonic traditions, notably the Arthurian legend. Deriving from Welsh source; King Arthur, Excalibur and Merlin, while the Jersey poet Wace introduced the Knights of the Round Table. These stories are most centrally brought together within Geoffrey of Monmouth's Historia Regum Britanniae (History of the Kings of Britain). Another early figure from British tradition, King Cole, may have been based on a real figure from Sub-Roman Britain. Many of the tales make up part of the wider Matter of Britain, a collection of shared British folklore.

The Loch Ness Monster is a cryptid that is reputed to inhabit Loch Ness in the Scottish Highlands. The legendary monster has been affectionately referred to by the nickname "Nessie" since the 1950s. The leprechaun figures large in Irish folklore. A mischievous fairy-type creature in emerald green clothing who when not playing tricks spends all its time busily making shoes, the leprechaun is said to have a pot of gold hidden at the end of the rainbow, and if ever captured by a human it has the magical power to grant three wishes in exchange for release. In mythology, English fairy tales such as Jack and the Beanstalk and Jack the Giant Killer helped form the modern perception of giants as stupid and violent, while the dwarf Tom Thumb is a traditional hero in English folklore.

English fairy tale Goldilocks and the Three Bears is one of the most popular fairy tales in the English language. Some folk figures are based on semi- or actual historical people whose story has been passed down centuries: Lady Godiva, for instance, was said to have ridden naked on horseback through Coventry; the heroic English figure Hereward the Wake resisted the Norman invasion; Herne the Hunter is an equestrian ghost associated with Windsor Forest and Great Park, and Mother Shipton is the archetypal witch. The chivalrous bandit, such as Dick Turpin, is a recurring character.

=== Pirates ===
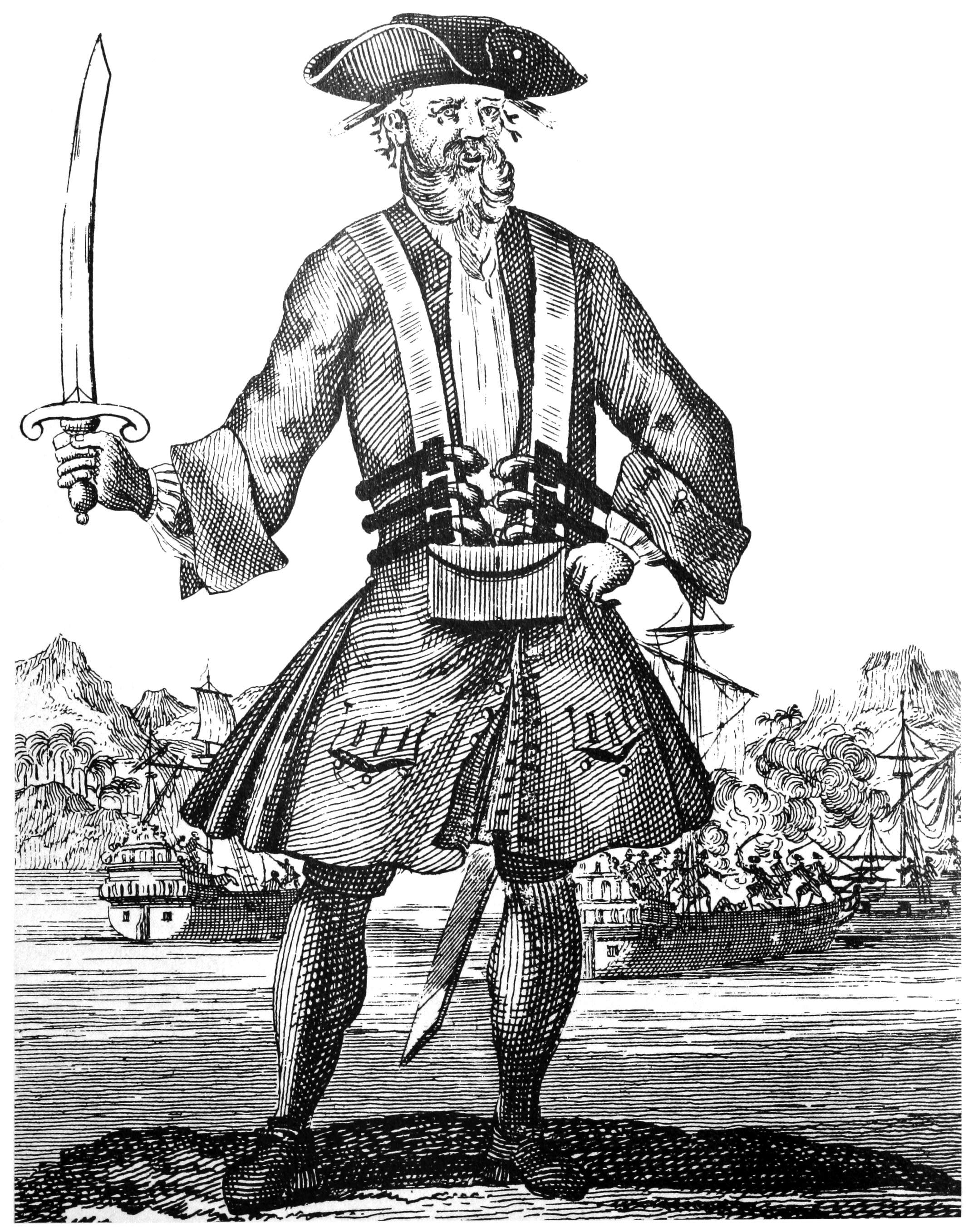
Engraving of the English pirate Blackbeard from the 1724 book A General History of the Pyrates. The book is the prime source for many famous pirates of the Golden Age.

Published in 1724, A General History of the Pyrates by Captain Charles Johnson provided the standard account of the lives of many pirates in the Golden Age. It influenced pirate literature of Scottish novelists Robert Louis Stevenson (Treasure Island) and J. M. Barrie. Many famous English pirates from the Golden Age hailed from the West Country in south west England—the stereotypical West Country "pirate accent" was popularised by West Country native Robert Newton's portrayal of Stevenson's Long John Silver in film. The concept of "walking the plank" was popularised by Barrie's Peter Pan, where Captain Hook's pirates helped define the archetype. Davy Jones' Locker, where sailors or ships' remains are consigned to the bottom of the sea, is first recorded by Daniel Defoe in 1726. Johnson's 1724 book gave a mythical status to famous English pirates such as Blackbeard and Samuel Bellamy, alongside giving them various Jolly Roger's of dubious historical truth. The most famous Jolly Roger, the Crossed Swords Jolly Roger, was factiously attributed to English pirate John Rackham.

=== Superstitions ===
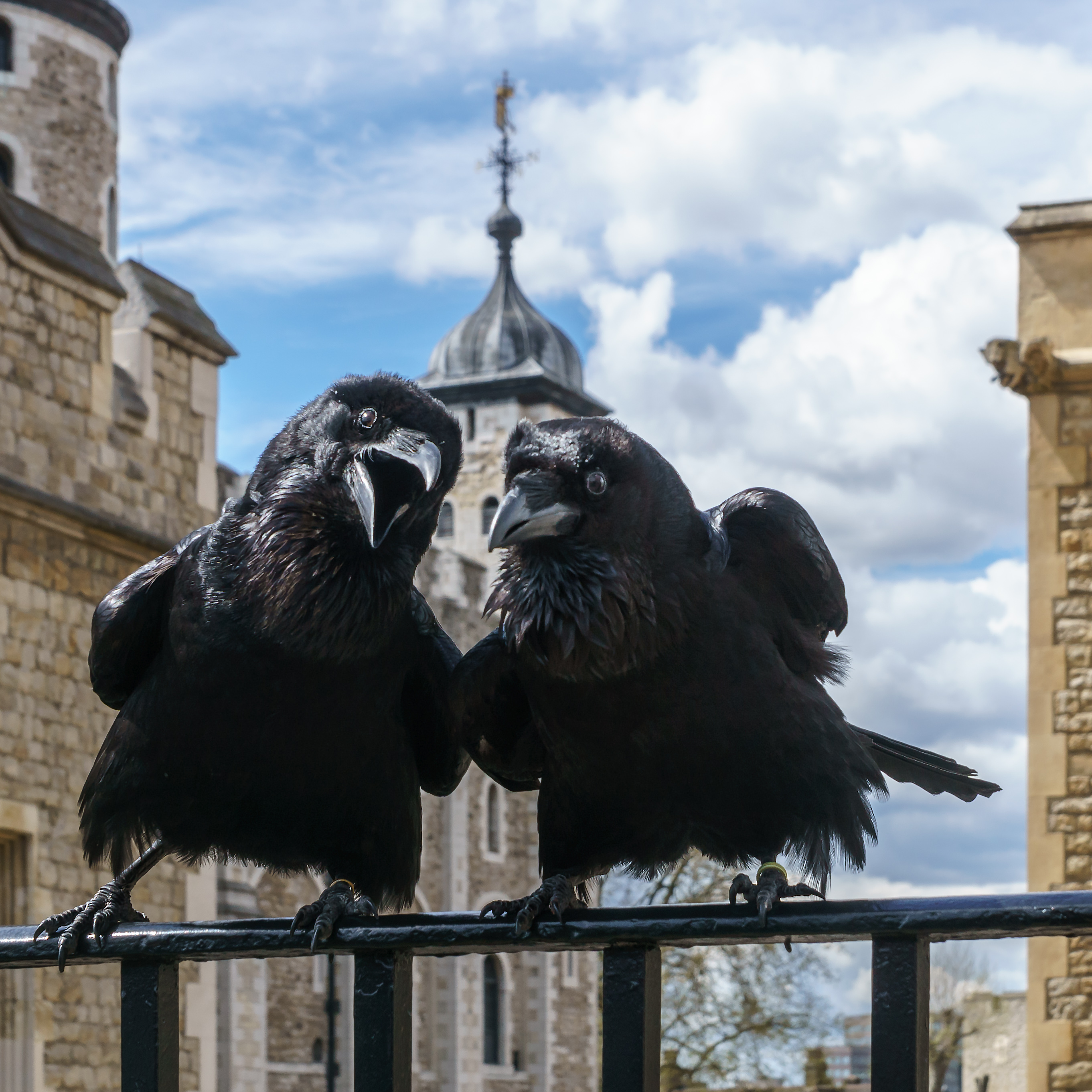
Two of the current Ravens of the Tower of London. The ravens' presence is traditionally believed to protect the Crown and the tower; a superstition holds that "if the Tower of London ravens are lost or fly away, the Crown will fall and Britain with it".

The Gremlin is part of Royal Air Force folklore dating from the 1920s, with "gremlin" being RAF slang for a mischievous creature that sabotages aircraft, meddling in the plane's equipment. Legendary figures from 19th-century London whose tales have been romanticised include Sweeney Todd, the murderous barber of Fleet Street (accompanied with Mrs. Lovett who sells pies made from Todd's victims), and serial killer Jack the Ripper. On 5 November, people in Britain celebrate Guy Fawkes Night by making bonfires and lighting fireworks in commemoration of the foiling of Guy Fawkes' Gunpowder Plot, which became an annual event after the Observance of 5th November Act 1605 was passed. Guy Fawkes masks are an emblem for anti-establishment protest groups.

=== Traditional non-religious holidays ===
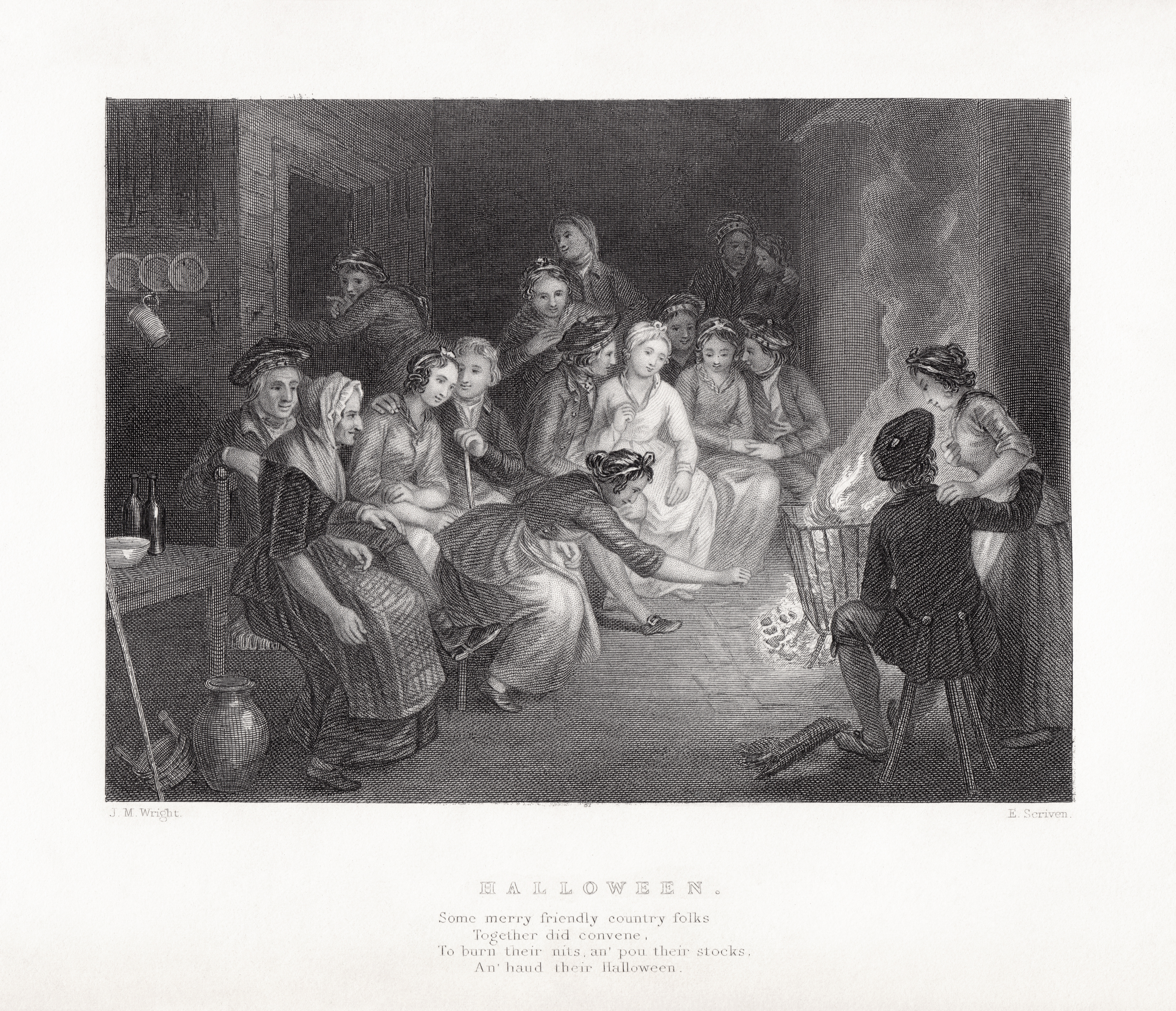
Robert Burns' "Halloween" (1785)

Halloween is a traditional and much celebrated holiday in Scotland and Ireland on the night of 31 October. The name "Halloween" is first attested in the 16th century as a Scottish shortening of the fuller All-Hallows-Even, and according to some historians has its roots in the Gaelic festival Samhain, when the Gaels believed the border between this world and the otherworld became thin, and the dead would revisit the mortal world. In 1780, Dumfries poet John Mayne makes note of pranks at Halloween; "What fearfu' pranks ensue!", as well as the supernatural associated with the night, "Bogies" (ghosts). Robert Burns' 1785 poem "Halloween" is recited by Scots at Halloween, and Burns was influenced by Mayne's composition.

In Scotland and Ireland, traditional Halloween customs include guising — children disguised in costume going from door to door requesting food or coins – which had become common practice by the late 19th century; (the Halloween masks, worn by children, are known as "false faces" in Ireland.) turnips hollowed out and carved with faces to make lanterns, and holding parties where games such as apple bobbing are played. Agatha Christie's mystery novel Hallowe'en Party is about a girl who is drowned in an apple-bobbing tub. Other practices in Ireland include lighting bonfires, and having firework displays. Further contemporary imagery of Halloween is derived from Gothic and horror literature (notably Shelley's Frankenstein and Stoker's Dracula), and classic horror films (such as Hammer Horrors). Mass transatlantic Irish and Scottish migration in the 19th century popularised Halloween in North America.

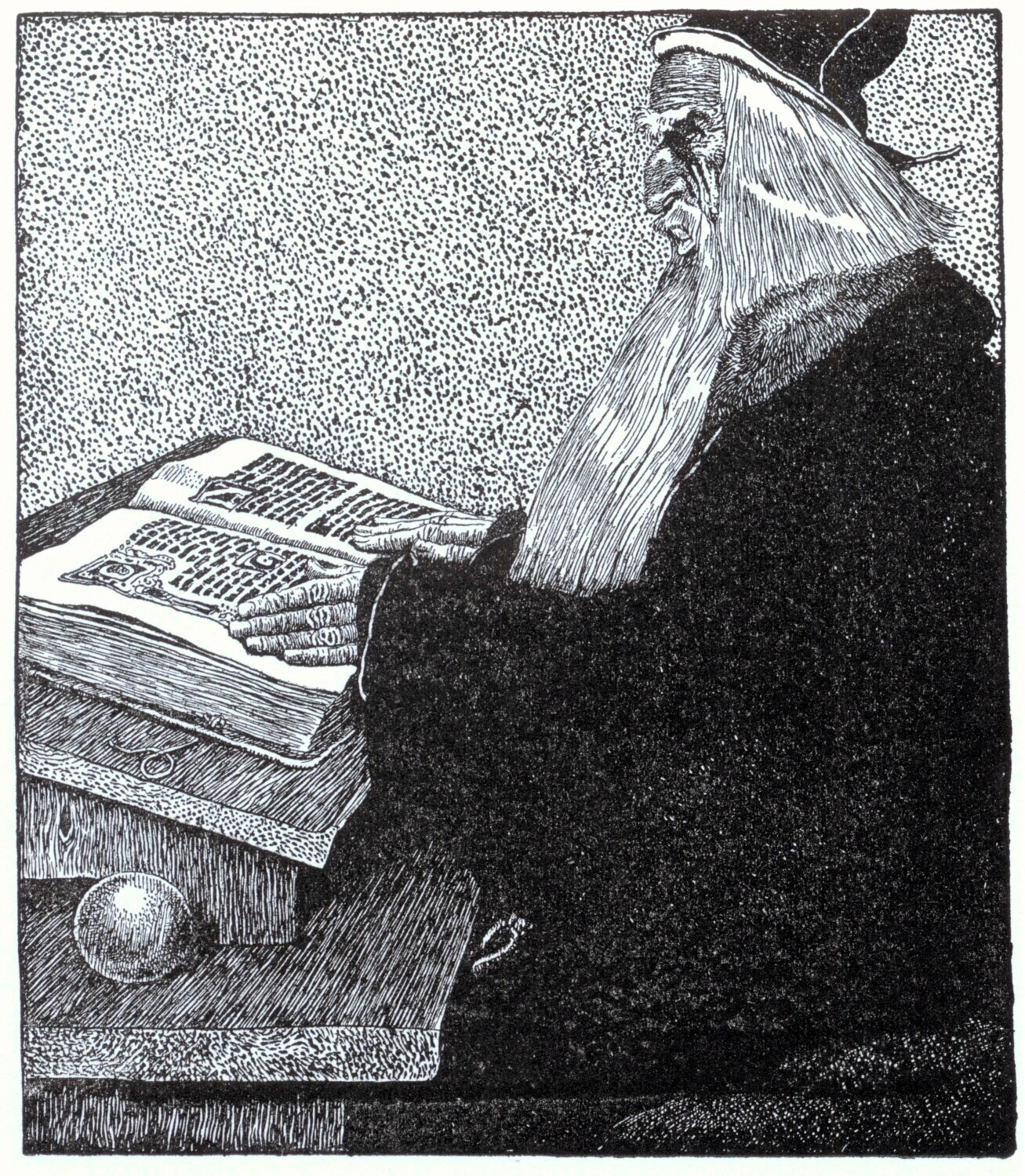
The wizard Merlin features as a character in many works of fiction, including the BBC series Merlin.

Witchcraft has featured in the British Isles for millennia. The use of a crystal ball to foretell the future is attributed to the druids. In medieval folklore King Arthur's magician, the wizard Merlin, carried around a crystal ball for the same purpose. John Dee, consultant to Elizabeth I, frequently used a crystal ball to communicate with the angels. Probably the most famous depiction of witchcraft in literature is in Shakespeare's 1606 play Macbeth, featuring the three witches and their cauldron. The ghost of Anne Boleyn is a frequently reported ghost sighting in the UK. Differing accounts include seeing her ghost ride up to Blickling Hall in a coach drawn by a headless horseman, with her own head on her lap.

Neopagan witchcraft began in England in the early 20th century with notable figures such as Aleister Crowley and the father of Wicca Gerald Gardner, before expanding westward in the 1960s. Settling down near the New Forest in Hampshire, Gardner joined an occult group through which he claimed to have encountered the New Forest coven into which he was initiated in 1939. Believing the coven to be a survival of the pre-Christian Witch-Cult, he decided to revive the faith, supplementing the coven's rituals with ideas borrowed from ceremonial magic and the writings of Crowley to form the Gardnerian tradition of Wicca. Moving to London in 1945, following the repeal of the Witchcraft Act 1735 Gardner became intent on propagating Wicca, attracting media attention and writing Witchcraft Today (1954) and The Meaning of Witchcraft (1959). Crowley (the founder of Thelema) was described as "the most notorious occultist magician of the 20th century", and he remains an influential figure over Western esotericism and the counter-culture. His motto of "Do What Thou Wilt" is inscribed on the vinyl of Led Zeppelin's album Led Zeppelin III, and he is the subject of Ozzy Osbourne's single "Mr Crowley".

== National parks, museums, libraries, and galleries ==
=== Heritage administration ===
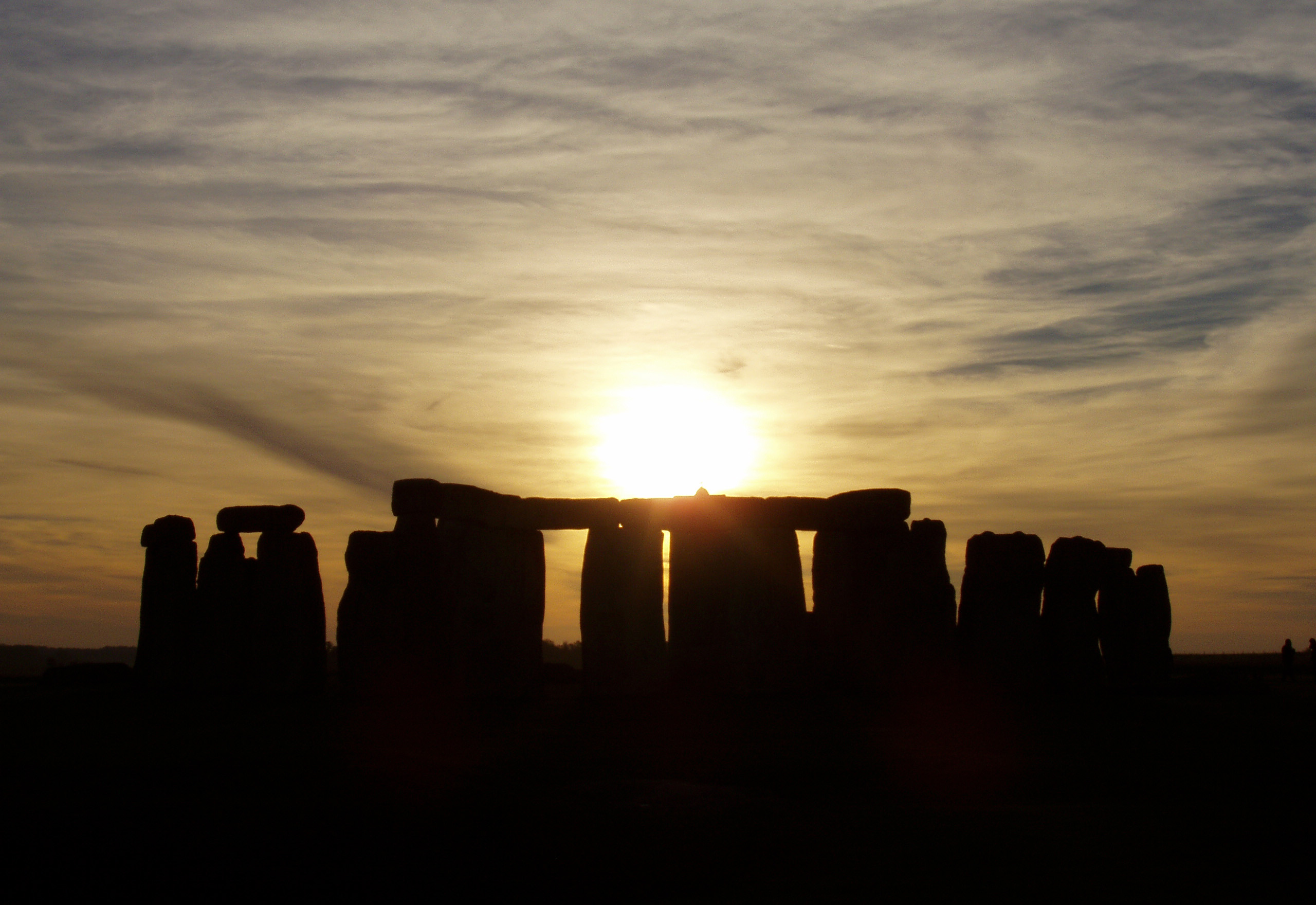
Stonehenge, Wiltshire at sunset

Each country has its own body responsible for heritage matters.

English Heritage is the government body with a broad remit of managing the historic sites, artefacts and environments of England. It is currently sponsored by the Department for Culture, Media and Sport. The charity National Trust for Places of Historic Interest or Natural Beauty has a contrasting role. Seventeen of the UNESCO World Heritage Sites are in England. Some of the best known of these include Hadrian's Wall, Stonehenge, Avebury and Associated Sites, Tower of London, Jurassic Coast, Westminster, Saltaire, Ironbridge Gorge, and Studley Royal Park. The northernmost point of the Roman Empire, Hadrian's Wall, is the largest Roman artefact anywhere: it runs a total of 73 miles in northern England.

Historic Environment Scotland is the executive agency of the Scottish Government, responsible for historic monuments in Scotland, such as Stirling Castle. The Old and New Town of Edinburgh is a notable Scottish World Heritage site. Balmoral Castle is the main Scottish residence of the British monarch. The Wallace Monument in Stirling contains artifacts believed to have belonged to Sir William Wallace, including the Wallace Sword. The Rob Roy Way, named after Scottish folk hero and outlaw Rob Roy MacGregor, is a long-distance footpath that runs for 92 miles. A statue of Robert the Bruce and a large monument and visitor centre (operated by the National Trust for Scotland) is located in Bannockburn near the site of the Battle of Bannockburn.

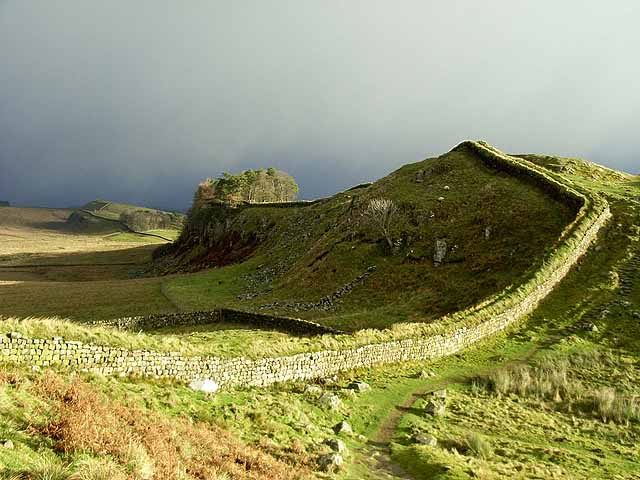
Hadrian's Wall was built in the 2nd century AD. It is a lasting monument from Roman Britain. It is the largest Roman artefact in existence.

Many of Wales' great castles, such as the Castles and Town Walls of King Edward in Gwynedd and other monuments, are under the care of Cadw, the historic environment service of the Welsh Government. Welsh actor Sir Anthony Hopkins donated millions to the preservation of Snowdonia National Park. The five most frequently visited Welsh castles are Caernarfon Castle, Conwy Castle, Caerphilly Castle, Harlech Castle and Beaumaris Castle.

The Northern Ireland Environment Agency promotes and conserves the natural and built environment in Northern Ireland, and the Giant's Causeway on the north-east coast is one of the natural World Heritage sites.

Tintagel Castle is a popular tourist destination in Cornwall, with the castle associated with the legend of King Arthur since the 12th century. There are 15 National Parks, including the Lake District in England, Snowdonia in Wales, and Loch Lomond and The Trossachs National Park in Scotland

=== Museums and galleries ===
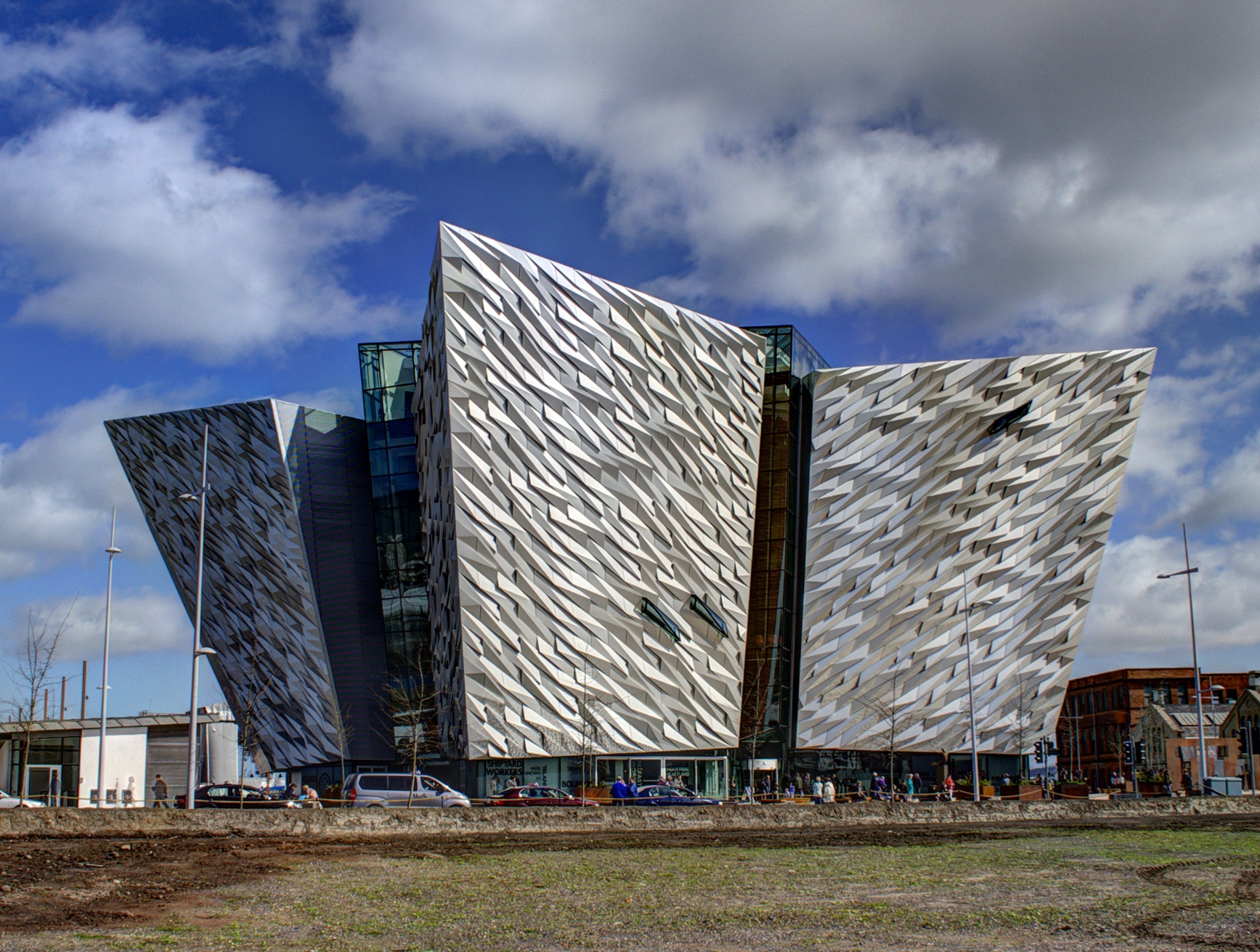
Titanic Belfast museum on the former shipyard in Belfast where the RMS Titanic was built

The British Museum in London with its collection of more than seven million objects, is one of the largest and most comprehensive in the world, and sourced from every continent, illustrating and documenting the story of human culture from its beginning to the present. On display since 1802, the Rosetta Stone is the most viewed attraction. The Natural History Museum, London was established by Richard Owen (who coined the term "dinosaur") to display the national collection of dinosaur fossils and other biological and geological exhibits. The National Museums of Scotland bring together national collections in Scotland. Amgueddfa Cymru – Museum Wales comprises eight museums in Wales. National Museums Northern Ireland has four museums in Northern Ireland including the Ulster Museum.

The Titanic Belfast museum, a visitor attraction in the Titanic Quarter, east Belfast, Northern Ireland on the regenerated site of the shipyard where Titanic was built, was opened to the public in 2012. The architecture is a tribute to Titanic itself, with the external facades a nod to the enormous hull of the ocean liner.

The first Madame Tussauds wax museum opened in London in 1835, and today displays waxworks of famous people from various fields, including royalty (Princess Diana), historical figures (Henry VIII), sport (David Beckham), music (Freddie Mercury), literature (Charles Dickens), politics (Winston Churchill), television (Gordon Ramsay), and cinema (Michael Caine) among others.

The most senior art gallery is the National Gallery in Trafalgar Square, which houses a collection of over 2,300 paintings dating from the mid-13th century to 1900. The Tate galleries house the national collections of British and international modern art; they also host the famously controversial Turner Prize. The National Galleries of Scotland are the five national galleries of Scotland and two partner galleries. The National Museum of Art, Wales, opened in 2011.

=== Libraries ===
The British Library in London is the national library and is one of the world's largest research libraries, holding over 150 million items in all known languages and formats; including around 25 million books. The library has two of the four remaining copies of the original Magna Carta (the other two copies are held in Lincoln Castle and Salisbury Cathedral) and has a room devoted solely to them. The British Library Sound Archive has over six million recordings (many from the BBC Sound Archive, including Winston Churchill's wartime speeches.)

The National Library of Scotland in Edinburgh holds 7 million books, 14 million printed items (such as the last letter written by Mary, Queen of Scots) and over 2 million maps. The National Library of Wales is the national legal deposit library of Wales, and holds over 6.5 million books, portraits, maps and photographic images in Wales.

=== Historical markers ===
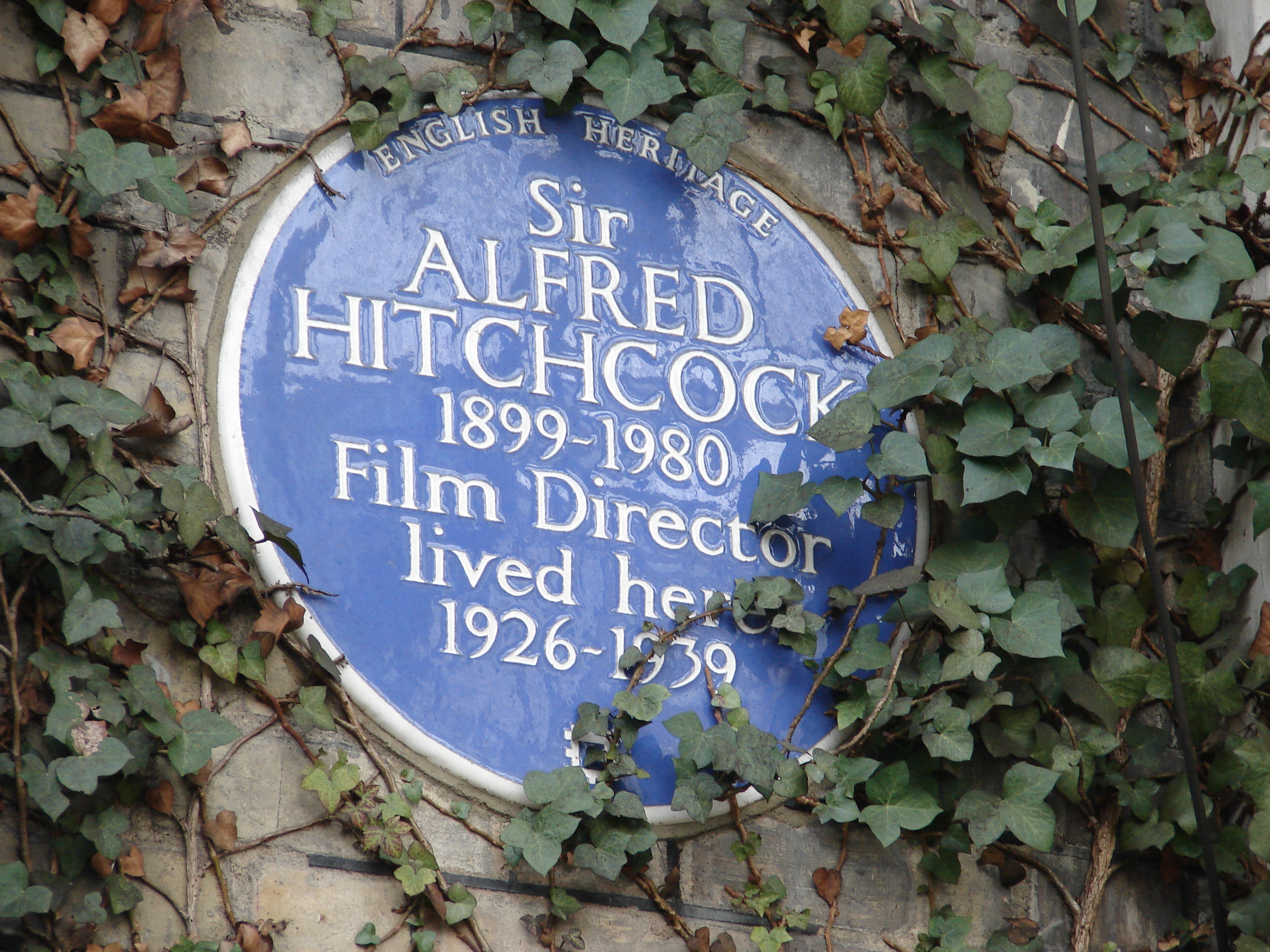
English Heritage blue plaque commemorating Sir Alfred Hitchcock at 153 Cromwell Road, London

Blue plaques are the oldest historical marker scheme in the world. The scheme was proposed by politician William Ewart in 1863 and was initiated in 1866 by the Society of Arts. Since 1986 it has been run by English Heritage.

The first plaque was unveiled in 1867 to commemorate Lord Byron at his birthplace, 24 Holles Street, Cavendish Square, London. Events commemorated by plaques include John Logie Baird's first demonstration of television at 22 Frith Street, Westminster, W1, London, the first sub 4-minute mile run by Roger Bannister on 6 May 1954 at Oxford University's Iffley Road Track, and a sweet shop in Llandaff, Cardiff that commemorates the mischief by a young Roald Dahl who put a mouse in the gobstoppers jar.

== Science and technology ==
From the time of the Scientific Revolution, England and Scotland, and thereafter the United Kingdom, have been prominent in world scientific and technological development. The Royal Society serves as the national academy for sciences, with members drawn from different institutions and disciplines. Formed in 1660, it is one of the oldest learned societies still in existence.

Sir Isaac Newton's publication of the Principia Mathematica ushered in what is recognisable as modern physics. The first edition of 1687 and the second edition of 1713 framed the scientific context of the foundation of the United Kingdom. He realised that the same force is responsible for movements of celestial and terrestrial bodies, namely gravity. He is the father of classical mechanics, formulated as his three laws and as the co-inventor (with Gottfried Leibniz) of differential calculus. He also created the binomial theorem, worked extensively on optics, and created a law of cooling.

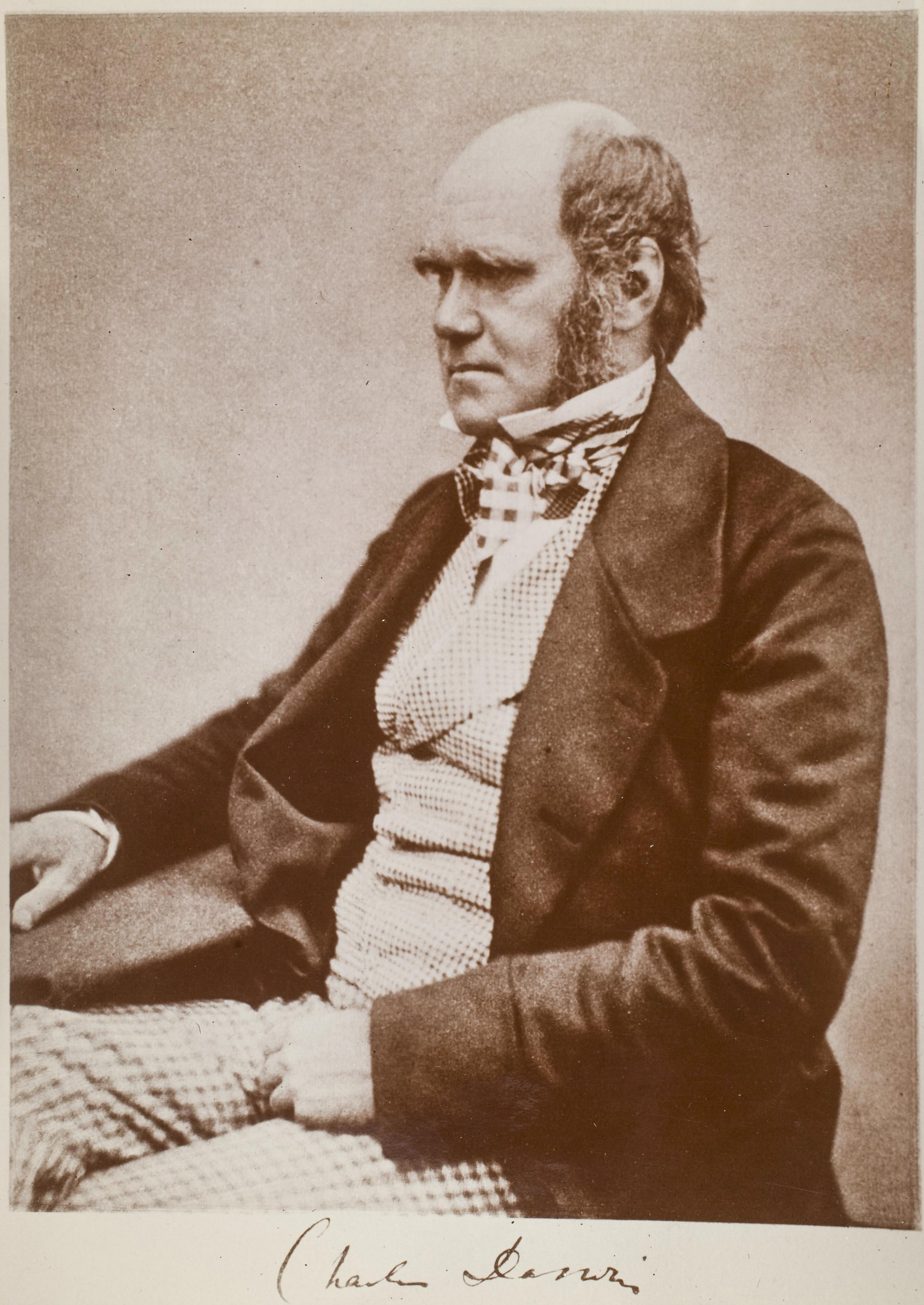
Charles Darwin established that all species of life have descended over time from common ancestors.

Figures from the UK have contributed to the development of most major branches of science. John Napier introduced logarithms in the early 17th century as a means to simplify calculations. Michael Faraday and James Clerk Maxwell unified the electric and magnetic forces in what are now known as Maxwell's equations. Following his publication of A Dynamical Theory of the Electromagnetic Field in 1865, Maxwell predicted the existence of radio waves in 1867. James Joule worked on thermodynamics and is often credited with the discovery of the principle of conservation of energy.

Naturalist Charles Darwin wrote On the Origin of Species and discovered the principle of evolution by natural selection. James Hutton, founder of modern geology, worked on the age of the Earth (deep time) which forms a key element of Darwin's theory. Other important geologists include Charles Lyell, author of Principles of Geology, who also coined the term Pleistocene, and Adam Sedgwick, who proposed (and coined) the name of the Cambrian Period. William Thomson (Baron Kelvin) drew important conclusions in the field of thermodynamics and invented the Kelvin scale of absolute zero. Paul Dirac was one of the pioneers of quantum mechanics. Botanist Robert Brown discovered the random movement of particles suspended in a fluid (Brownian motion). John Stewart Bell created Bell's Theorem. Harold Kroto discovered buckminsterfullerene.

Other 19th- and early 20th-century British pioneers in their field include Joseph Lister (antiseptic surgery), Edward Jenner (vaccination), Richard Owen (palaeontology, coined the term Dinosaur), Florence Nightingale (nursing), Sir George Cayley (aerodynamics), William Fox Talbot (photography), and Howard Carter (modern archaeology, discovered Tutankhamun).

Scholarly descriptions of dinosaur bones first appeared in the late 17th-century England. Between 1815 and 1824, William Buckland discovered fossils of Megalosaurus and became the first person to describe a dinosaur in a scientific journal. The second dinosaur genus to be identified, Iguanodon, was discovered in 1822 by Mary Ann Mantell. In 1832, Gideon Mantell discovered fossils of a third dinosaur, Hylaeosaurus. Owen recognised that the remains of the three new species that had been found so far shared a number of distinctive features. He decided to present them as a distinct taxonomic group, dinosaurs.

John Harrison invented the marine chronometer, a key piece in solving the problem of accurately establishing longitude at sea, thus revolutionising and extending the possibility of safe long-distance sea travel. The most celebrated British explorers include James Cook, Walter Raleigh, Sir Francis Drake, Henry Hudson, George Vancouver, Sir John Franklin, David Livingstone, Captain John Smith, Robert Falcon Scott, Lawrence Oates and Ernest Shackleton. The aquarium craze began in Victorian England when Philip Henry Gosse created and stocked the first public aquarium at London Zoo in 1853, and coined the term "aquarium" when he published The Aquarium: An Unveiling of the Wonders of the Deep Sea in 1854. Robert FitzRoy pioneered weather forecasting: the first daily weather forecasts were published in The Times in 1861.

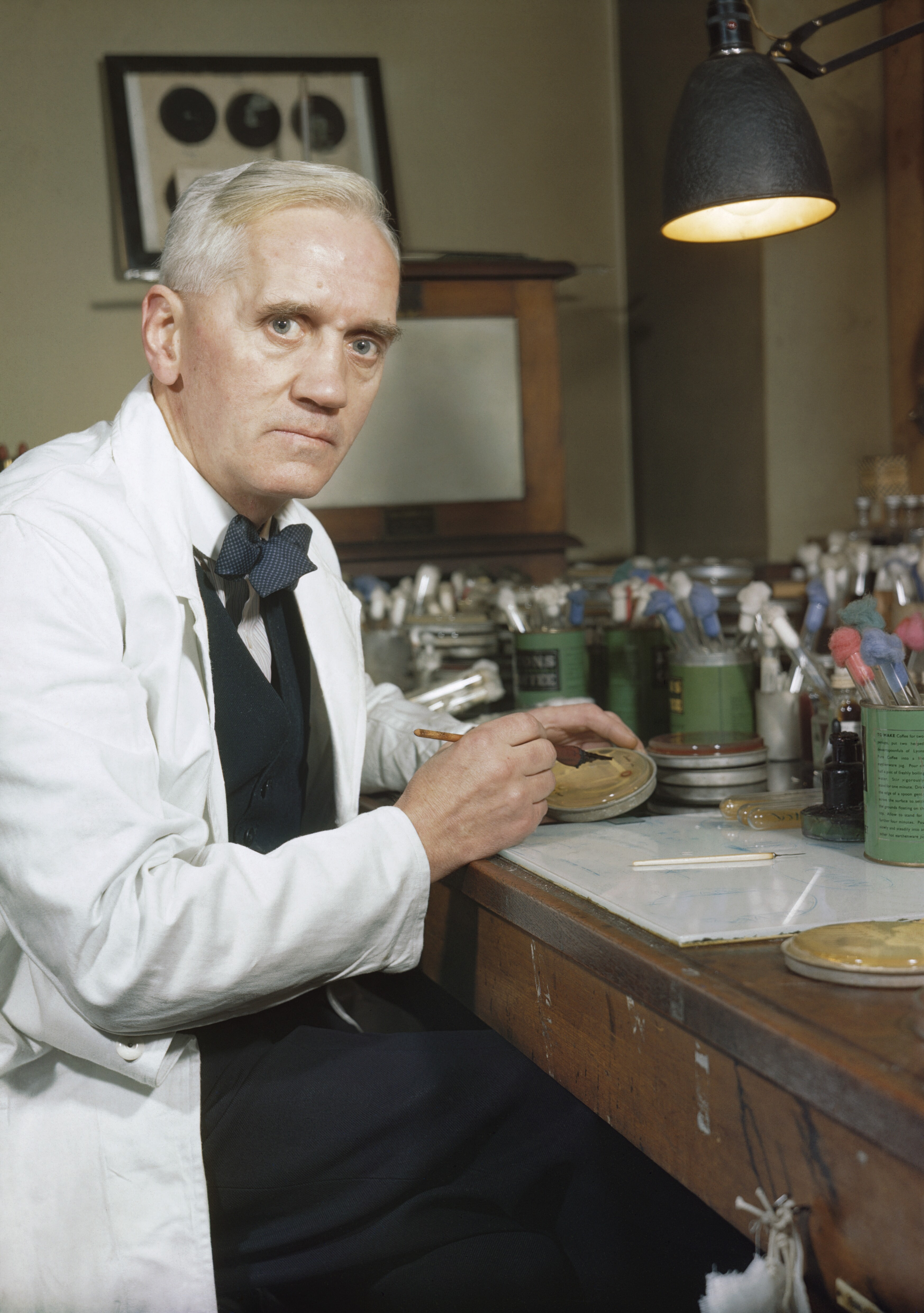
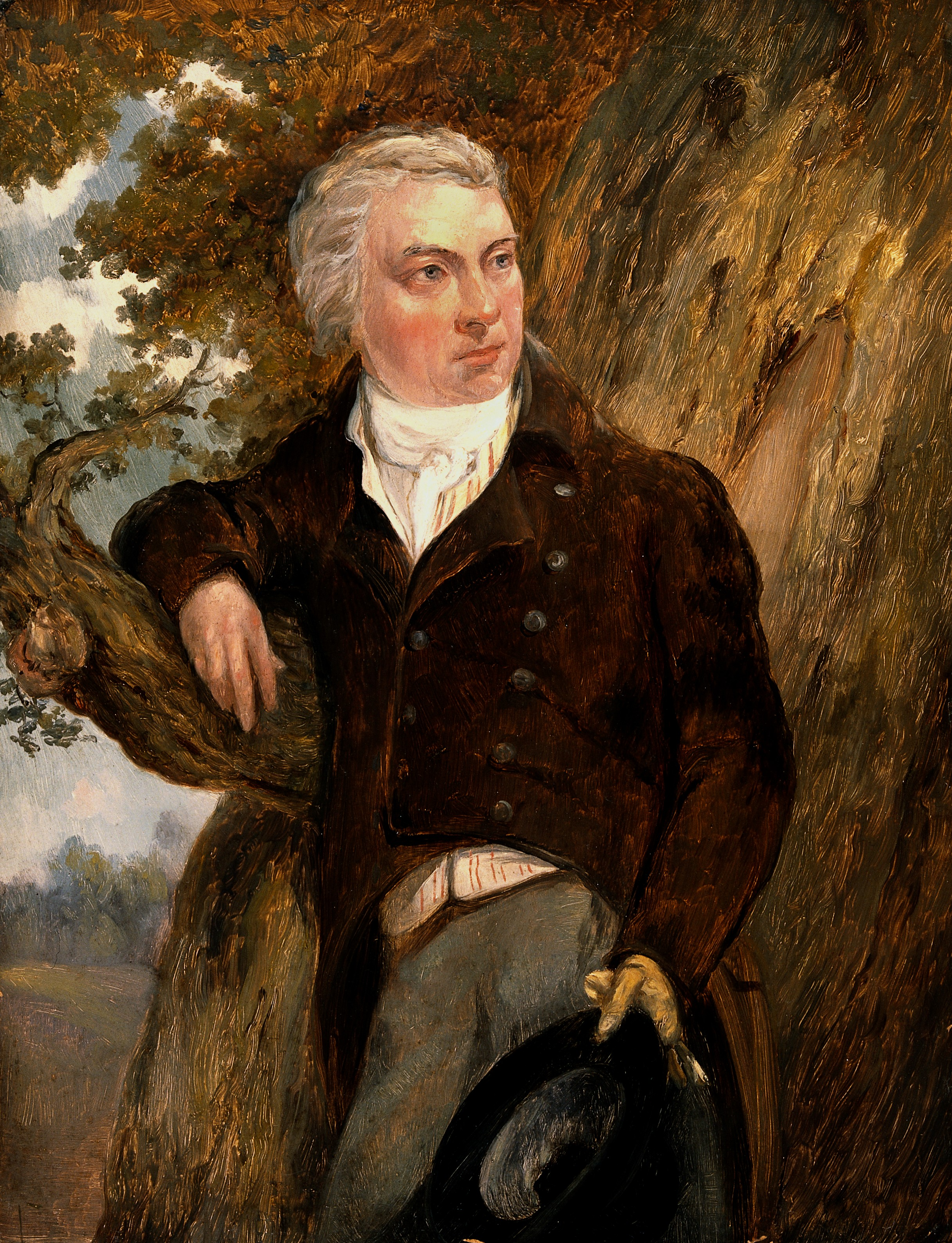
Biologist Alexander Fleming (left) discovered the world's first antibiotic. Physician Edward Jenner (right) discovered the world's first vaccine.

A crucial advance in the development of the flush toilet was the S-trap invented by Alexander Cumming in 1775 – it uses the standing water to seal the outlet of the bowl, preventing the escape of foul air from the sewer. In 1824 Charles Macintosh invented the modern raincoat; the Mackintosh (mac) is named after him. William Sturgeon invented the electromagnet in 1824. The first commercial electrical telegraph was co-invented by Sir William Fothergill Cooke and Charles Wheatstone. They patented it in May 1837 as an alarm system, and it was first successfully demonstrated on 25 July 1837 between Euston and Camden Town in London.

Postal reformer Sir Rowland Hill is regarded as the creator of the modern postal service and the inventor of the postage stamp (Penny Black) — with his solution of pre-payment facilitating the safe, speedy and cheap transfer of letters. Hill's colleague Sir Henry Cole introduced the world's first commercial Christmas card in 1843. In 1851 Sir George Airy established the Royal Observatory, Greenwich, London, as the location of the prime meridian where longitude is defined to be 0° (one of the two lines that divide the Earth into the Eastern and Western Hemispheres). George Boole authored The Laws of Thought which contains Boolean algebra. Forming the mathematical foundations of computing, Boolean logic laid the foundations for the information age.

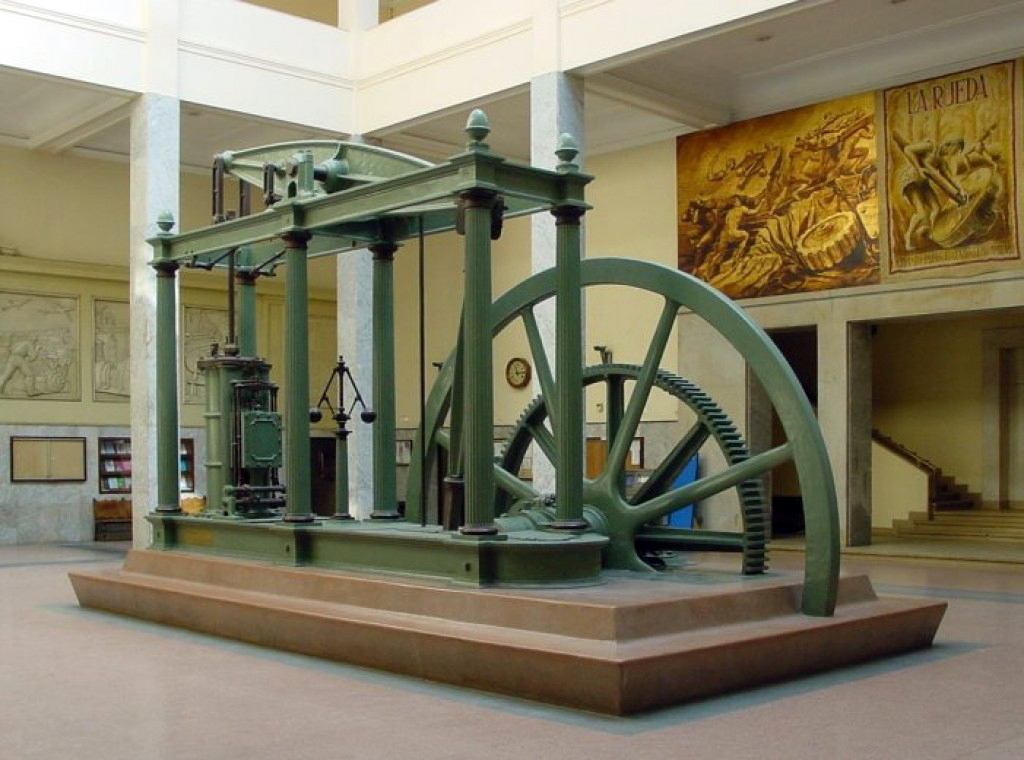
A Watt steam engine, the steam engine that propelled the Industrial Revolution in Britain and the world

Historically, many of the UK's greatest scientists have been based at either Oxford or Cambridge University, with laboratories such as the Cavendish Laboratory in Cambridge and the Clarendon Laboratory in Oxford becoming famous in their own right. In modern times, other institutions such as the Red Brick and New Universities are catching up with Oxbridge. For instance, Lancaster University has a global reputation for work in low temperature physics.

Technologically, the UK is also amongst the world's leaders. Historically, it was at the forefront of the Industrial Revolution, with innovations especially in textiles, the steam engine, railroads, machine tools and civil engineering. Famous British engineers and inventors from this period include James Watt, Robert Stephenson, Richard Arkwright, Henry Maudslay and the 'father of Railways' George Stephenson. Maudslay's most influential invention was the screw-cutting lathe, a machine which created uniformity in screws and allowed for the application of interchangeable parts (a prerequisite for mass production): it was a revolutionary development necessary for the Industrial Revolution. The UK has the oldest railway networks in the world, with the Stockton and Darlington Railway, opened in 1825, the first public railway to use steam locomotives. Opened in 1863, London Underground is the world's first underground railway. Running along the East Coast Main Line between Edinburgh and London, the Flying Scotsman has been ranked the world's most famous steam locomotive.

Engineer Isambard Kingdom Brunel, another major figure of the Industrial Revolution, was placed second in a 2002 BBC nationwide poll to determine the "100 Greatest Britons". He created the Great Western Railway, as well as famous steamships including the SS Great Britain, the first propeller-driven ocean-going iron ship, and SS Great Eastern which laid the first lasting transatlantic telegraph cable. Josiah Wedgwood pioneered the industrialisation of pottery manufacture. In 1820, Scottish road builder John McAdam invented "macadamisation" for building roads with a smooth hard surface. In 1901, Edgar Purnell Hooley added tar to the mix and named it Tarmac (short for tarmacadam).

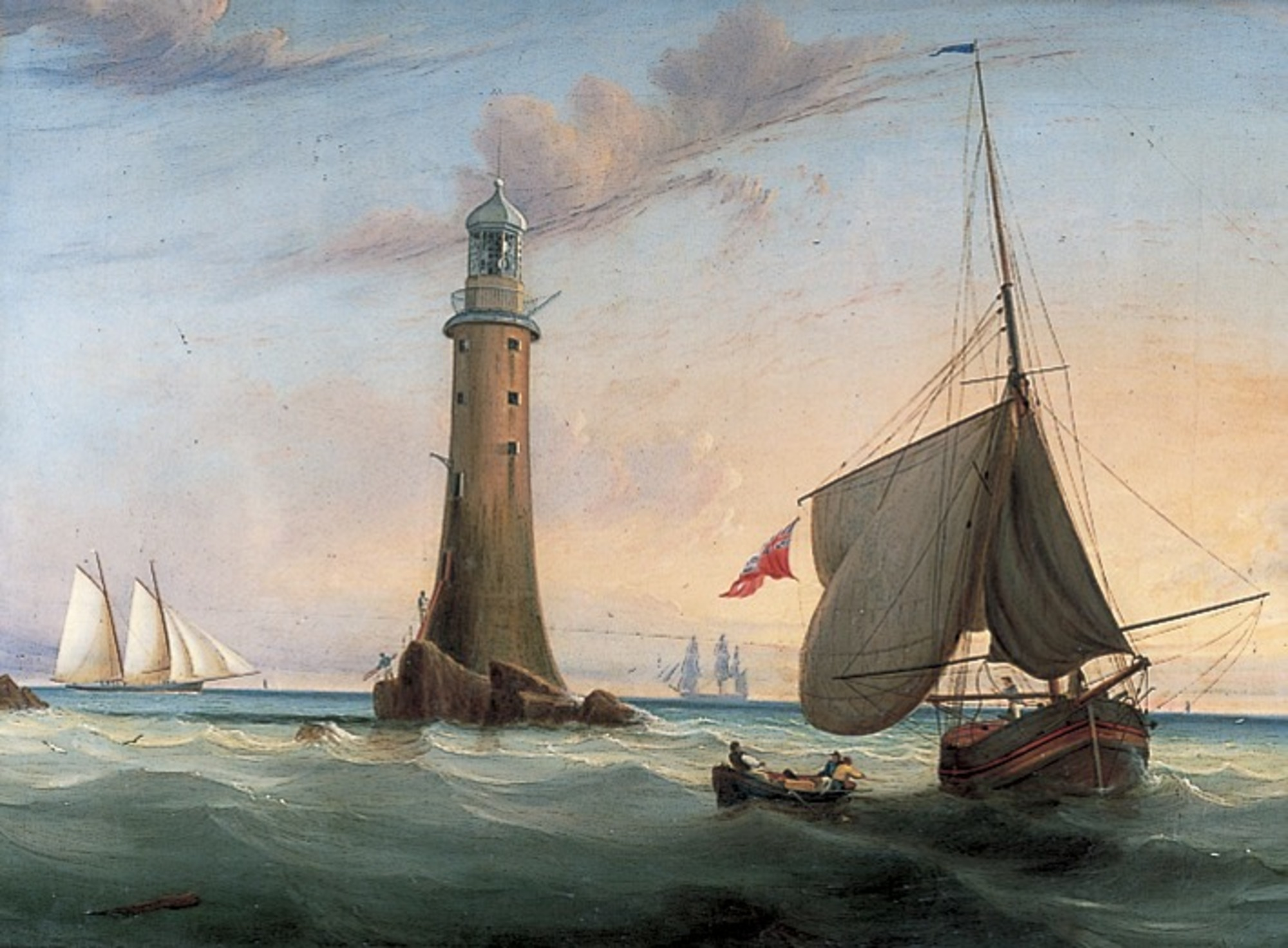
Smeaton's Eddystone Lighthouse, 9 miles out to sea. John Smeaton pioneered hydraulic lime in concrete which led to the development of Portland cement in England and thus modern concrete.

Probably the greatest driver behind the modern use of concrete was Smeaton's Tower built by John Smeaton in the 1750s. The third Eddystone Lighthouse (the world's first open ocean lighthouse), Smeaton pioneered the use of hydraulic lime in concrete. Scotsman Robert Stevenson constructed the Bell Rock Lighthouse in the early 1800s. Situated 11 miles off east Scotland, it is the world's oldest surviving sea-washed lighthouse. Portland cement, the most common type of cement in general use around the world as a basic ingredient of concrete, was developed in England in the 19th century. It was coined by Joseph Aspdin in 1824 (he named it after Portland stone), and further developed by his son William Aspdin in the 1840s.

The UK has produced some of the most famous ships in the world: Harland and Wolff in Belfast built the RMS Titanic as well as her sister ships RMS Olympic and RMS Britannic; in Clydebank John Brown and Company built the RMS Queen Mary, RMS Queen Elizabeth and SS Queen Elizabeth 2; ships built in England include the Mary Rose (King Henry VIII's warship), the Golden Hind (Sir Francis Drake's ship for the circumnavigation of the globe between 1577 and 1580), HMS Victory (Lord Nelson's flagship at the Battle of Trafalgar in 1805), and HMS Beagle (ship used in Charles Darwin's five-year voyage). Other important British ships include HMS Endeavour (James Cook's ship in his first voyage of discovery), HMS Challenger (first global marine research expedition: the Challenger expedition), and Discovery (carried Robert Falcon Scott and Ernest Shackleton in the Discovery Expedition, their first successful journey to the Antarctic). The Royal Navy troopship HMS Birkenhead is known for the first appearance of the "women and children first" protocol.

Since then, the UK has continued this tradition of technical creativity. Alan Turing (leading role in the creation of the modern computer), Scottish inventor Alexander Graham Bell (the first practical telephone), John Logie Baird (world's first working television system, first electronic colour television), Frank Whittle (co-invented the jet engine) — powered by Whittle's turbojet engines, the Gloster Meteor was the first British jet fighter and the Allies' only jet aircraft to achieve combat operations during World War II, Charles Babbage (devised the idea of the computer), Alexander Fleming (discovered penicillin). The UK remains one of the leading providers of technological innovations, providing inventions as diverse as the World Wide Web by Sir Tim Berners-Lee, and Viagra by British scientists at Pfizer's Sandwich, Kent. Sir Alec Jeffreys pioneered DNA fingerprinting. Pioneers of fertility treatment Patrick Steptoe and Robert Edwards, achieved conception through IVF (world's first "test tube baby") in 1978.

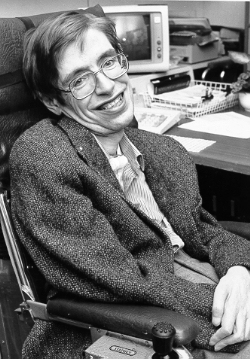
Physicist Stephen Hawking set forth a theory of cosmology explained by a union of the general theory of relativity and quantum mechanics. His 1988 book A Brief History of Time appeared on The Sunday Times best-seller list for a record-breaking 237 weeks.

The prototype tank was constructed at William Foster & Co. in Lincoln in 1915, with leading roles played by Major Walter Gordon Wilson who designed the gearbox and developed practical tracks and by William Tritton whose company built it. This was a prototype of the Mark I tank, the first tank used in combat in September 1916 during WWI. The First Lord of the Admiralty, Winston Churchill, was credited by Prime Minister David Lloyd George as being the driving force behind their production. Allan Beckett designed the 'Whale' floating roadway, crucial to the success of the Mulberry harbour used in the invasion of Normandy in WWII. In 1918, HMS Argus became the world's first aircraft carrier capable of launching and recovering naval aircraft, and in WWII, HMS Ark Royal was involved in the first aerial and U-boat kills of the war, as well as the crippling of the German battleship the Bismarck in May 1941. In 1932, Cambridge engineer Francis Thomas Bacon invented the alkaline fuel cell which is used to generate power for space capsules and satellites.

Introduced in 1952, the de Havilland Comet was the world's first commercial jet airliner. Operated by British Overseas Airways Corporation (which merged with other British operators to form today's British Airways), on 2 May 1952 the flight registered G-ALYS took off with fare-paying passengers and inaugurated scheduled service from London to Johannesburg.

In 1952, OXO (or Noughts and Crosses), created by computer scientist Alexander S. Douglas, is regarded as a contender for the first video game. In OXO, the computer player could play perfect games of noughts and crosses against a human opponent. In the 1960s, John Shepherd-Barron invented the cash machine (ATM) and James Goodfellow invented Personal identification number (PIN) technology, and on 27 June 1967, the first cash machine was established outside a branch of Barclays Bank in Enfield, north London. Dolly the sheep, the first mammal successfully cloned from an adult somatic cell (by scientists at Roslin Institute in Edinburgh), became a celebrity in the 1990s.

=== Industrial Revolution ===
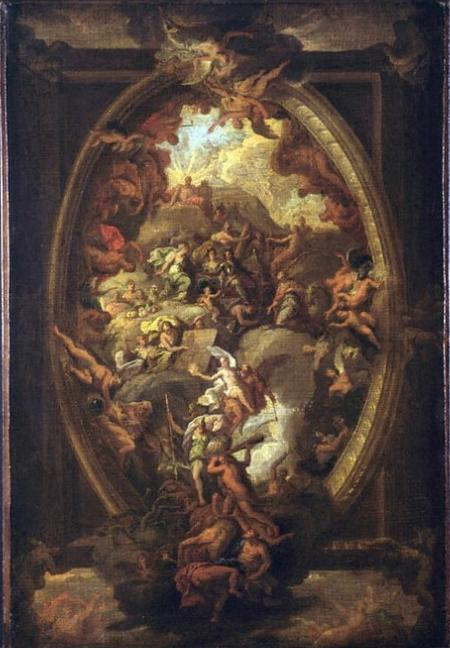
William III and Mary II Presenting the Cap of Liberty to Europe, 1716, Sir James Thornhill. Enthroned in heaven with the Virtues behind them are the royals William and Mary who had taken the throne after the Glorious Revolution and signed the English Bill of Rights of 1689. William tramples on arbitrary power and hands the red cap of liberty to Europe where, unlike Britain, absolute monarchy stayed the normal form of power execution. Below William is the French king Louis XIV.

The Industrial Revolution began in Britain due to the social, economic and political changes in the country during the previous centuries. The stable political situation in Britain from around 1688 following the Glorious Revolution, in contrast to other European countries where absolute monarchy remained the typical form of government, can be said to be a factor in favouring Britain as the birthplace of the Industrial Revolution. Aided by these legal and cultural foundations, an entrepreneurial spirit and consumer revolution drove industrialisation in Britain. Geographical and natural resource advantages of Great Britain also contributed, with the country's extensive coast lines and many navigable rivers in an age where water was the easiest means of transportation. Britain also had high quality coal.

Historian Jeremy Black states, "an unprecedented explosion of new ideas, and new technological inventions, transformed our use of energy, creating an increasingly industrial and urbanised country. Roads, railways and canals were built. Great cities appeared. Scores of factories and mills sprang up. Our landscape would never be the same again. It was a revolution that transformed not only the country, but the world itself."

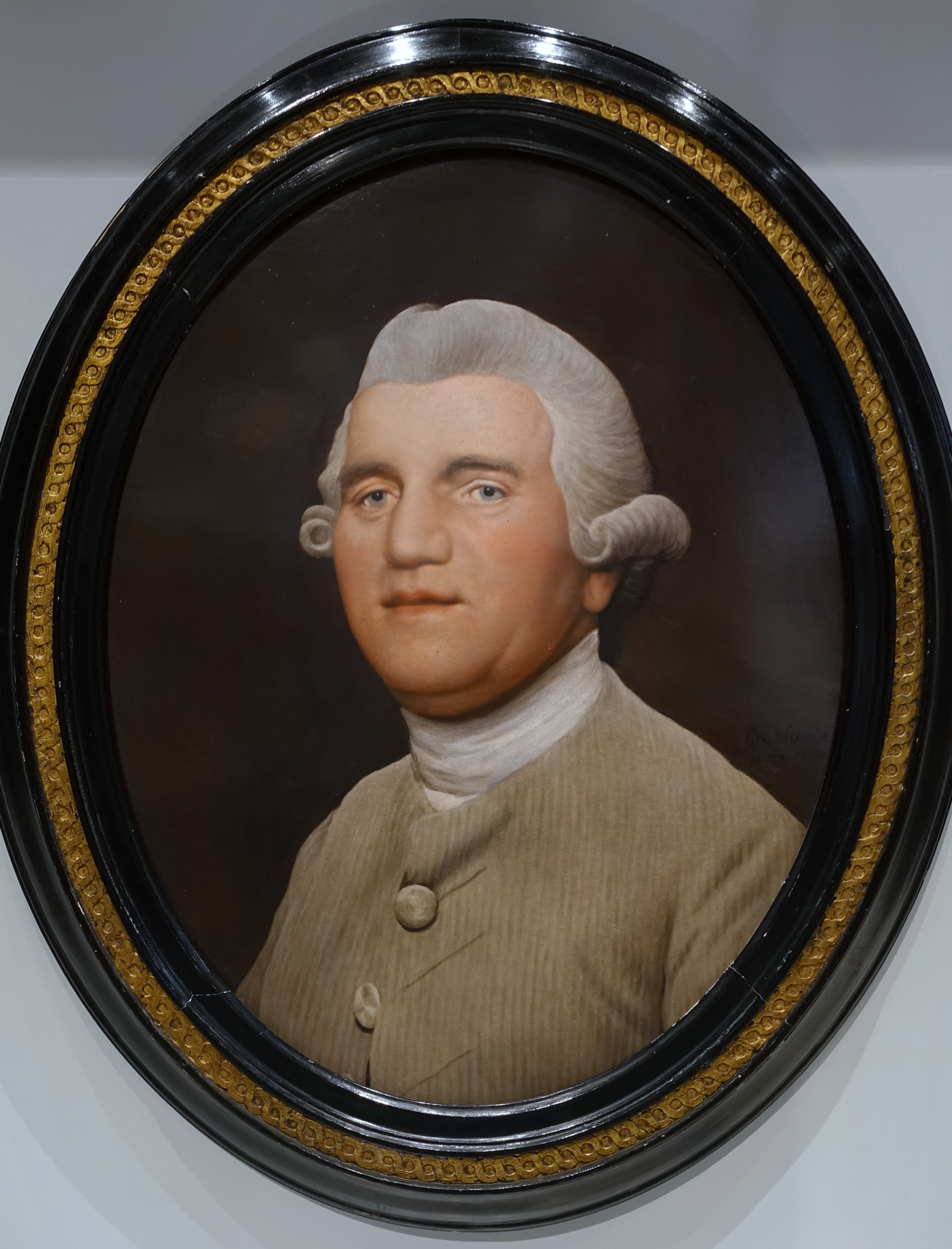
Josiah Wedgwood was a leading entrepreneur in the Industrial Revolution.

Pottery manufacturer Josiah Wedgwood was one of the most successful entrepreneurs of the Industrial Revolution. Meeting the demands of the consumer revolution and growth in wealth of the middle classes that helped drive the Industrial Revolution in Britain, Wedgwood created goods such as soft-paste porcelain tableware (bone china), which was starting to become a common feature on dining tables. Credited as a pioneer of modern marketing, Wedgwood pioneered direct mail, money back guarantees, travelling salesmen, carrying pattern boxes for display, self-service, free delivery, buy one get one free, and illustrated catalogues. Other important figures in marketing and advertising in the 18th and 19th centuries were Thomas Chippendale, the London cabinet-maker who in 1754 produced the "first comprehensive trade catalogue of its kind", and Thomas J. Barratt, who became the first brand manager of a company (Pears soap) in 1865. In 1882, English actress and socialite Lillie Langtry was recruited by Barratt to become the poster-girl for Pears (which included putting her "signature" on the advertisements), as she became the first celebrity to endorse a commercial product.

Described as "natural capitalists" by the BBC, dynasties of Quakers were successful in business matters, and they contributed the Industrial Revolution in Britain. This included ironmaking by Abraham Darby I and his family; banking, including Lloyds Bank (founded by Sampson Lloyd), Barclays Bank, Backhouse's Bank and Gurney's Bank; life assurance (Friends Provident); pharmaceuticals (Allen & Hanburys); the big three British chocolate companies (Cadbury, Fry's and Rowntree); biscuit manufacturing (Huntley & Palmers); match manufacture (Bryant and May) and shoe manufacturing (Clarks). With his role in the marketing and manufacturing of James Watt's steam engine, and invention of modern coinage, Matthew Boulton is regarded as one of the most influential entrepreneurs in history. In 1861, Welsh entrepreneur Pryce Pryce-Jones formed the first mail order business, an idea which would change the nature of retail. Selling Welsh flannel, he created mail order catalogues, with customers able order by mail for the first time, and the goods were delivered by railway.

=== Cars ===
The UK has had a long history of car making. Some of the best known British brands are Rolls-Royce, Bentley, Aston Martin, McLaren, Jaguar, Land Rover, MG, and the Mini. Rolls-Royce was founded by Charles Stewart Rolls and Sir Frederick Henry Royce in 1906. In addition to the company's reputation for superior engineering quality in its cars, Rolls-Royce Limited was known for manufacturing the high-powered "R" engines, including the iconic Rolls-Royce Merlin aero engine which was used for many World War II aircraft. Bentley Motors Limited was founded by W. O. Bentley in 1919 in Cricklewood, North London, and, like Rolls-Royce, is regarded as a British luxury automobile icon. Aston Martin was founded in 1913 by Lionel Martin and Robert Bamford, and became associated with luxury grand touring cars in the 1950s and 1960s, and with the fictional British spy James Bond. Jaguar was founded in 1922. The Jaguar E-Type sports car was released in 1961; Enzo Ferrari called it "the most beautiful car ever made". Jaguar has, in recent years, manufactured cars for the British Prime Minister. The company also holds royal warrants from Queen Elizabeth II and Prince Charles. The Land Rover launched in 1948 and specialises in four-wheel-drive. Many models have been developed for the Ministry of Defence (MoD). The Mini was released by the British Motor Corporation in 1959 and became a 1960s cultural icon. The performance versions, the Mini Cooper, was a successful rally car. The distinctive two-door Mini was designed for BMC by Sir Alec Issigonis. It has been named Britain's favourite car in a poll.

== Religion ==
Forms of Christianity have dominated religious life in what is now the United Kingdom for more than 1,400 years. Anglican churches remain the largest faith group in each country of the UK except Scotland, where Anglicanism is a small minority. The Presbyterian Church of Scotland is the national church in Scotland. Following this is Roman Catholicism and religions including Islam, Hinduism, Sikhism, Judaism, and Buddhism. Today British Jews number around 300,000; the UK has the fifth largest Jewish community worldwide.

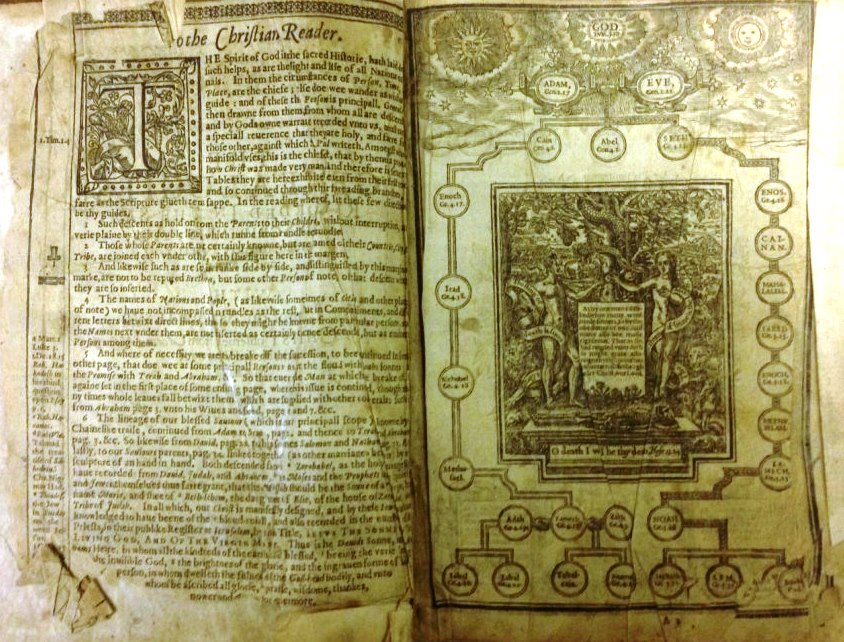
John Speed's Genealogies Recorded in the Sacred Scriptures (1611), bound into first King James Bible in quarto size (1612)

William Tyndale's 1520s translation of the Bible was the first to be printed in English, and was a model for subsequent English translations, notably the King James Version in 1611. The Book of Common Prayer of 1549 was the first prayer book to include the complete forms of service for daily and Sunday worship in English, and the marriage and burial rites have found their way into those of other denominations and into the English language.

In 17th-century England, the Puritans condemned the celebration of Christmas. In contrast, the Anglican Church "pressed for a more elaborate observance of feasts, penitential seasons, and saints' days. The calendar reform became a major point of tension between the Anglicans and Puritans." The Catholic Church also responded, promoting the festival in a more religiously orientated form. King Charles I of England directed his noblemen and gentry to return to their landed estates in midwinter to keep up their old-style Christmas generosity. Following the Parliamentarian victory over Charles I in the English Civil War, Puritan rulers banned Christmas in 1647.

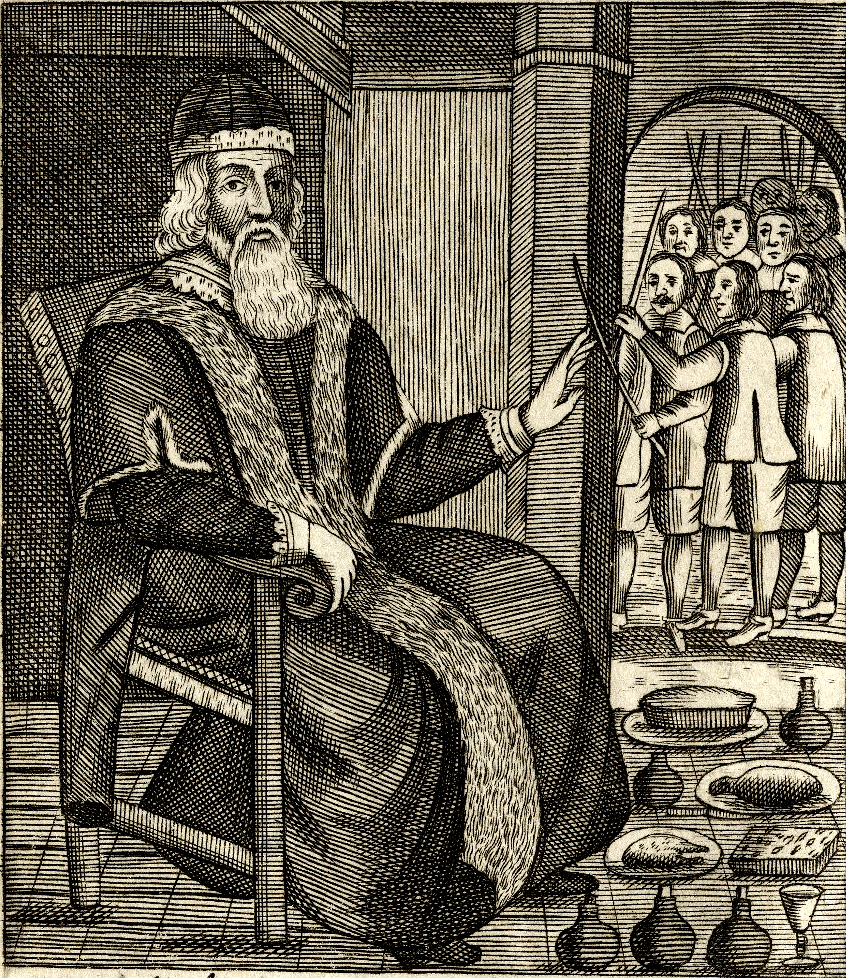
The Examination and Trial of Father Christmas (1686), published after Christmas was reinstated as a holy day in England

Protests followed as pro-Christmas rioting broke out in several cities; and for weeks Canterbury was controlled by the rioters, who decorated doorways with holly and shouted royalist slogans. The book, The Vindication of Christmas (London, 1652), argued against the Puritans, and notes old English Christmas traditions: dinner, roast apples on the fire, card playing, dances with "plow-boys" and "maidservants", old Father Christmas and carol singing. The Restoration of King Charles II in 1660 ended the ban.

Following the Restoration, Poor Robins Almanack contained the lines:

Now thanks to God for Charles return
Whose absence made old Christmas mourn
For then we scarcely did it know
Whether it Christmas were or no.

The diary of James Woodforde, from the latter half of the 18th century, details Christmas observance and celebrations associated with the season over a number of years.

In the early 19th century, writers imagined Tudor Christmas as a time of heartfelt celebration. In 1843, Charles Dickens wrote the novel A Christmas Carol that helped revive the "spirit" of Christmas and seasonal merriment. Dickens sought to construct Christmas as a family-centred festival of generosity, linking "worship and feasting, within a context of social reconciliation." Superimposing his humanitarian vision of the holiday, termed "Carol Philosophy", Dickens influenced many aspects of Christmas celebrated today in Western culture, such as family gatherings, seasonal food and drink, dancing, games, and a festive generosity of spirit. A prominent phrase from the tale, "Merry Christmas", was popularised following its publication. The term Scrooge became a synonym for miser, with "Bah! Humbug!" dismissive of the festive spirit. Tiny Tim says "God bless us, every one!" which he offers as a blessing at Christmas dinner. Dickens repeats the phrase at the end of the story; symbolic of Scrooge's change of heart.

Queen Victoria's Christmas tree at Windsor Castle, published in the Illustrated London News, 1848

The revival of the Christmas Carol began with William Sandys's Christmas Carols Ancient and Modern (1833), with the first appearance in print of "The First Noel", "I Saw Three Ships", "Hark the Herald Angels Sing" and "God Rest Ye Merry, Gentlemen". In 1843 the first commercial Christmas card was produced by Henry Cole, leading to the exchange of festive greeting cards among the public. The movement coincided with the appearance of the Oxford Movement and the growth of Anglo-Catholicism, which led a revival in traditional rituals and religious observances.

In the UK, the Christmas tree was introduced in the early 19th century, following the personal union with the Kingdom of Hanover, by Charlotte of Mecklenburg-Strelitz, wife of King George III. In 1832, the future Queen Victoria wrote about her delight at having a Christmas tree, hung with lights, ornaments, and presents placed round it. After her marriage to her German cousin Prince Albert, a hugely influential image of the British royal family with their Christmas tree at Windsor Castle was published in the Illustrated London News in 1848, after which the custom became more widespread throughout Britain.

While 2001 census information suggests that over 75% of British citizens consider themselves to belong to a religion, Gallup reports that only 10% of British citizens regularly attend religious services. A 2004 YouGov poll found that 44% of British citizens believe in God, while 35% do not. Christmas and Easter are national public holidays in the UK. First broadcast over the Easter period in 1977, the two-part Jesus of Nazareth television miniseries, starring Robert Powell as Jesus, was watched by over 21 million viewers in the UK. In 1844 Sir George Williams founded YMCA (Young Men's Christian Association) in London. The oldest and largest youth charity in the world, its aim is to support young people to belong, contribute and thrive in their communities. The Salvation Army is a Christian charity founded by William Booth and his wife Catherine in London's East End in 1865. It seeks to bring salvation to the poor, destitute and hungry.

== Politics and government ==
=== The Crown and parliament ===
The UK has a parliamentary government based on the Westminster system that has been emulated around the world – a legacy of the British Empire. The Parliament of the United Kingdom that meets in the Houses of Parliament has two houses: an elected House of Commons and an appointed House of Lords, and any Bill passed requires Royal Assent to become law. It is the ultimate legislative authority in the United Kingdom: the devolved parliaments and assemblies in Scotland, Northern Ireland and Wales are not sovereign bodies and could be abolished by the UK Parliament, despite each being established following public approval as expressed in a referendum.

The UK's two major political parties are the Labour Party and the Conservative Party, who between them won 532 out of 650 seats in the House of Commons at the most recent general election. Currently, the third biggest party in terms of seats in the Commons is the Liberal Democrats, or Lib Dems, which won 72 seats. The Scottish National Party (SNP) in Scotland is the forth largest, but only won 7 out of the 59 Scottish constituencies. There are also smaller parties in the Commons, like Reform UK and Green Party, or regional parties like Plaid Cymru (Wales), the Alliance Party of Northern Ireland, the Social Democratic and Labour Party, Democratic Unionist Party, and Sinn Féin (Northern Ireland).

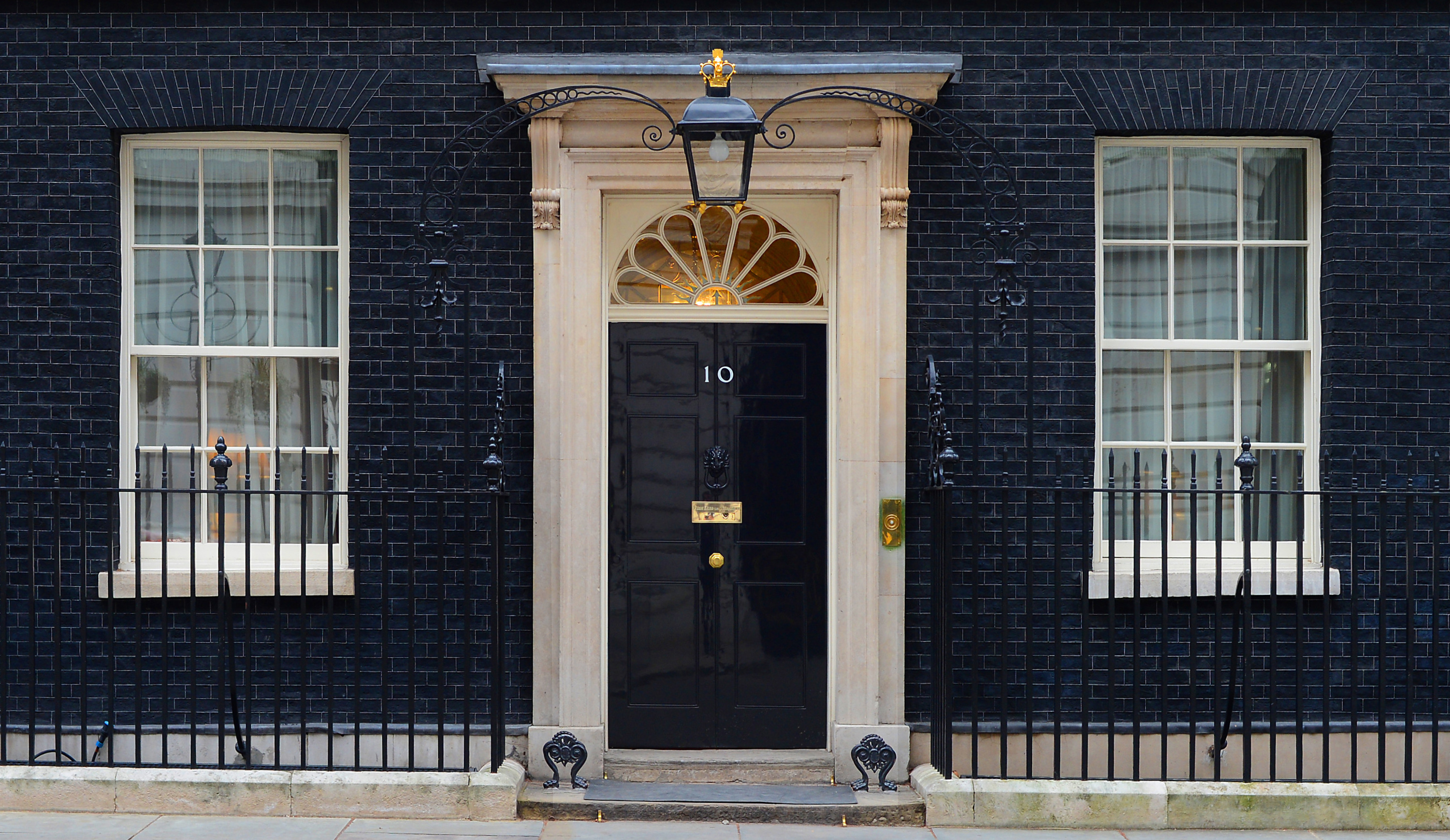
10 Downing Street, official residence of the Prime Minister

A prominent part of British political culture, Prime Minister's Questions – often referred to as "PMQs" – is held every Wednesday at noon when the House of Commons is sitting. The Prime Minister spends around half an hour responding to questions from members of parliament (MPs). In questioning the policies of government ministers, MP Amber Rudd states "PMQs is central to our democracy." Due to the drama of the sessions, PMQs is among the best-known parliamentary business in the country. It is broadcast live on BBC News, Sky News and BBC Parliament television channels, as well as streamed online by many news outlets via numerous services, such as Twitch or YouTube.

The United Kingdom has an uncodified constitution, the Constitution of the United Kingdom, consisting mostly of a collection of disparate written sources, including statutes, judge-made case law, and international treaties. As there is no technical difference between ordinary statutes and constitutional law, the British Parliament can perform constitutional reform simply by passing Acts of Parliament and thus has the political power to change or abolish almost any written or unwritten element of the constitution. However, no Parliament can pass laws that future Parliaments cannot change.

=== The law ===
British constitutional documents include Magna Carta (foundation of the "great writ" Habeas corpus — safeguarding individual freedom against arbitrary state action), the Bill of Rights 1689 (one provision granting freedom of speech in Parliament), Petition of Right, Habeas Corpus Act 1679 and Parliament Acts 1911 and 1949. A separate but similar document, the Claim of Right Act, applies in Scotland. Jurist Albert Venn Dicey wrote that the British Habeas Corpus Acts "declare no principle and define no rights, but they are for practical purposes worth a hundred constitutional articles guaranteeing individual liberty". An advocate of the "unwritten constitution", Dicey stated English rights were embedded in the general English common law of personal liberty, and "the institutions and manners of the nation".

According to 2016 figures from the Ministry of Justice, there is a 35% chance of people in England and Wales being summoned for jury duty over the course of their lifetime. In Scotland the percentage is higher due to Scotland having a lower population as well having juries made up of fifteen people as opposed to twelve in England and Wales.

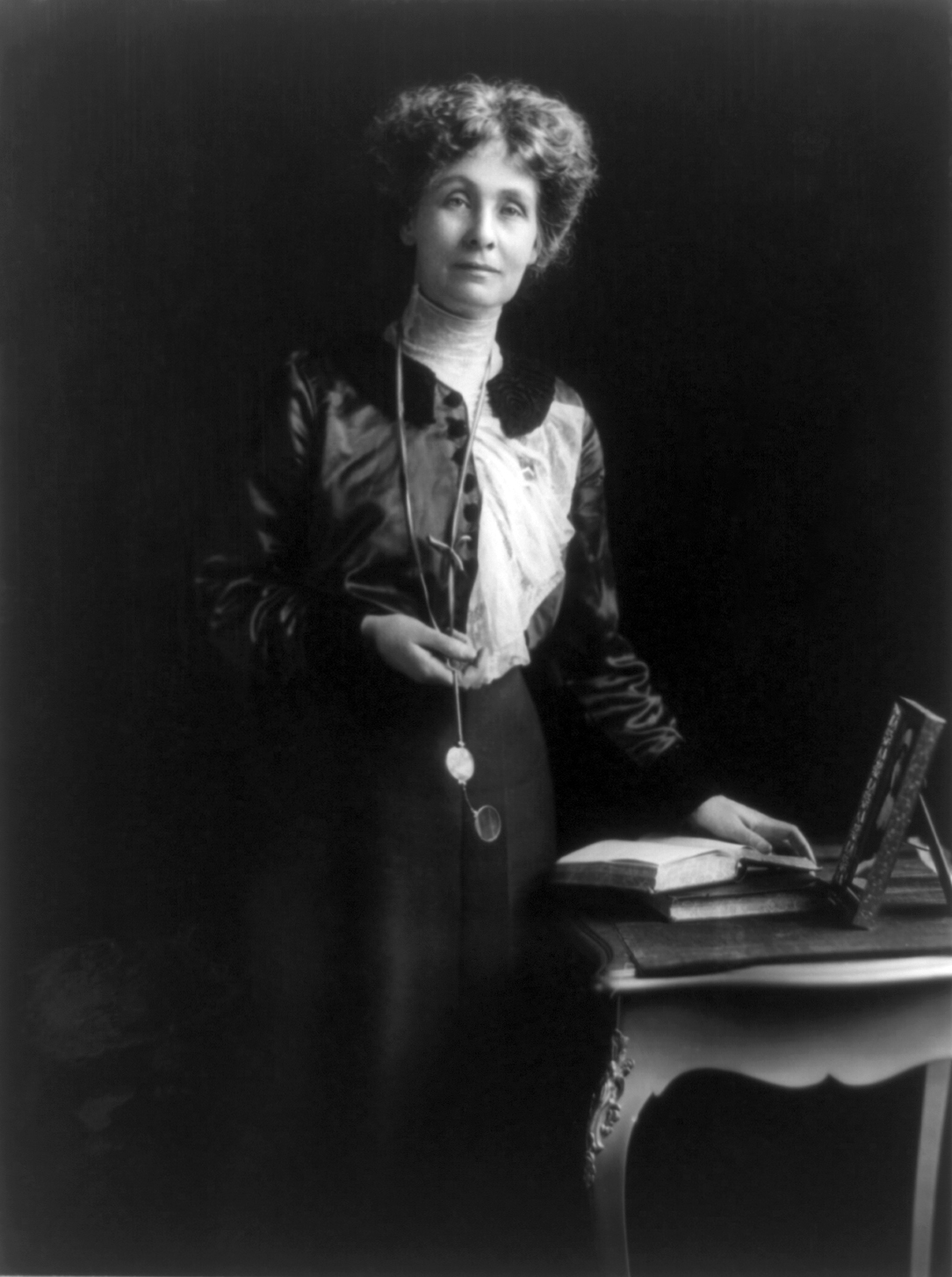
Emmeline Pankhurst. Named one of the 100 Most Important People of the 20th Century by Time, Pankhurst was a leading figure in the suffragette movement.

The 17th-century English patriot John Hampden was a leading parliamentarian involved in challenging the authority of Charles I when he refused to be taxed for ship money in 1637, and was one of the Five Members whose attempted unconstitutional arrest by the King in the House of Commons in 1642 sparked the English Civil War. The wars established the constitutional rights of parliament, a concept legally established as part of the Glorious Revolution in 1688 and the subsequent Bill of Rights 1689. Since that time, no British monarch has entered the House of Commons when it is sitting. Hampden is annually commemorated at the State Opening of Parliament by the British monarch when the doors of the House of Commons are slammed in the face of the monarch's messenger, symbolising the rights of Parliament and its independence from the monarch.

Other important British political figures include Sir Edward Coke, 17th-century jurist; the legal directive that nobody may enter a home, which in the 17th-century would typically have been male owned, unless by the owners invitation or consent, was established as common law in Coke's Institutes of the Lawes of England. "For a man's house is his castle, et domus sua cuique est tutissimum refugium [and each man's home is his safest refuge]." It is the origin of the famous dictum, "an Englishman's home is his castle". Sir William Blackstone, 18th-century jurist, judge and politician best known for his Commentaries on the Laws of England, containing his formulation: "It is better that ten guilty persons escape than that one innocent suffer", a principle that government and the courts must err on the side of innocence, Emmeline Pankhurst, leading suffragette which helped win women the right to vote, William Wilberforce, leading parliamentary abolitionist. An influential thinker in the history of liberalism, 19th century philosopher, political economist and politician John Stuart Mill justified the freedom of the individual in opposition to unlimited state and social control. A member of the Liberal Party, he was also the first Member of Parliament to call for women's suffrage.

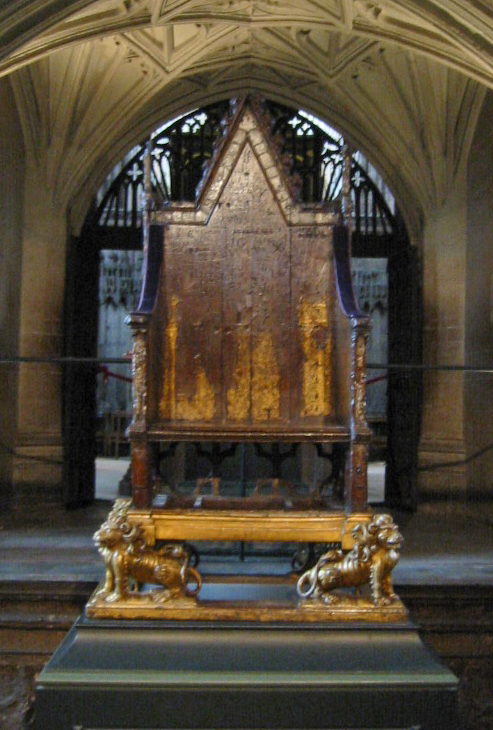
King Edward's Chair in Westminster Abbey. A 13th-century wooden throne on which the British monarch sits when he or she is crowned at the coronation, swearing to uphold the law and the church. The monarchy is apolitical and impartial, with a largely symbolic role as head of state.

Robert Walpole is generally regarded as the first British Prime Minister (1721–1742). Twice Prime Minister, Sir Robert Peel, founded the Conservative party (which was expanded by Benjamin Disraeli), and created the modern police force. Margaret Thatcher was the first female British Prime Minister (1979–1990). She became known as the "Iron Lady", a term coined by a Soviet journalist for her uncompromising politics and leadership style. In 1938, Neville Chamberlain believed he had secured "Peace for our time" with Germany, a year before WWII broke out.

English poet William Cowper wrote in 1785, "We have no slaves at home – Then why abroad? Slaves cannot breathe in England; if their lungs receive our air, that moment they are free, They touch our country, and their shackles fall. That's noble, and bespeaks a nation proud. And jealous of the blessing. Spread it then, And let it circulate through every vein." Thomas Clarkson described fellow British abolitionist Josiah Wedgwood's 1787 anti-slavery medallion, "Am I Not A Man And A Brother?", as "promoting the cause of justice, humanity and freedom". Following the Slave Trade Act 1807, Britain pressed other nations to end their trade with a series of treaties, and in 1839 the world's oldest international human rights organisation, Anti-Slavery International, was formed in London, which worked to outlaw slavery abroad; Wilberforce's abolitionist colleague Thomas Clarkson was the organisation's first key speaker. The 1965 suspension of the death penalty for murder had been introduced to Parliament as a private member's bill by Sydney Silverman MP. The world's largest human rights organisation, Amnesty International, was founded by Peter Benenson in London in 1961.

=== Honours system ===
The British honours system is a means of rewarding individuals' personal bravery, achievement or service to the United Kingdom. Candidates are identified by public or private bodies or by government departments or are nominated by members of the public. Nominations are reviewed by honours committees, made up of government officials and private citizens from different fields, who meet twice a year to discuss the candidates and make recommendations for appropriate honours to be awarded by the King.

Historically a knighthood was conferred upon mounted warriors. By the Late Middle Ages, the rank had become associated with the ideals of chivalry, a code of conduct for the perfect courtly Christian warrior. An example of warrior chivalry in medieval literature is Sir Gawain (King Arthur's nephew and a Knight of the Round Table) in Sir Gawain and the Green Knight (late 14th century). Since the early modern period, the title of knight is purely honorific, usually bestowed by a monarch, often for non-military service to the country. The modern female equivalent in the UK is damehood. The ceremony often takes place at Buckingham Palace, and family members are invited to attend.

A few examples of knights are Sir Nicholas Winton: for "services to humanity, in saving Jewish children from Nazi occupied Czechoslovakia", Sir Elton John: for "services to music and charitable services", Sir Ridley Scott: for "services to the British film industry", and Sir Richard Branson: for "services to entrepreneurship". Examples of dames are: actress Dame Julie Andrews and singer Dame Shirley Bassey: both for "services to the performing arts", actress Dame Joan Collins: for "services to charity", and Dame Agatha Christie: for "contribution to literature".

=== Counties ===
The suffix "shire" is attached to most of the names of English, Scottish and Welsh counties. Shire is a term for a division of land first used in England during the Anglo-Saxon period. Examples in England are Cheshire, Hampshire, Nottinghamshire, Oxfordshire, Staffordshire, Worcestershire and Yorkshire; in Scotland, Aberdeenshire, Perthshire, Inverness-shire and Stirlingshire; and in Wales, Carmarthenshire, Flintshire and Pembrokeshire. This suffix tends not to be found in the names of counties that were pre-existing divisions. Essex, Kent, and Sussex, for example, have never borne a -shire, as each represents a former Anglo-Saxon kingdom. Similarly Cornwall was a British kingdom before it became an English county. The term "shire" is also not used in the names of the six traditional counties of Northern Ireland.

=== Units of measurement ===
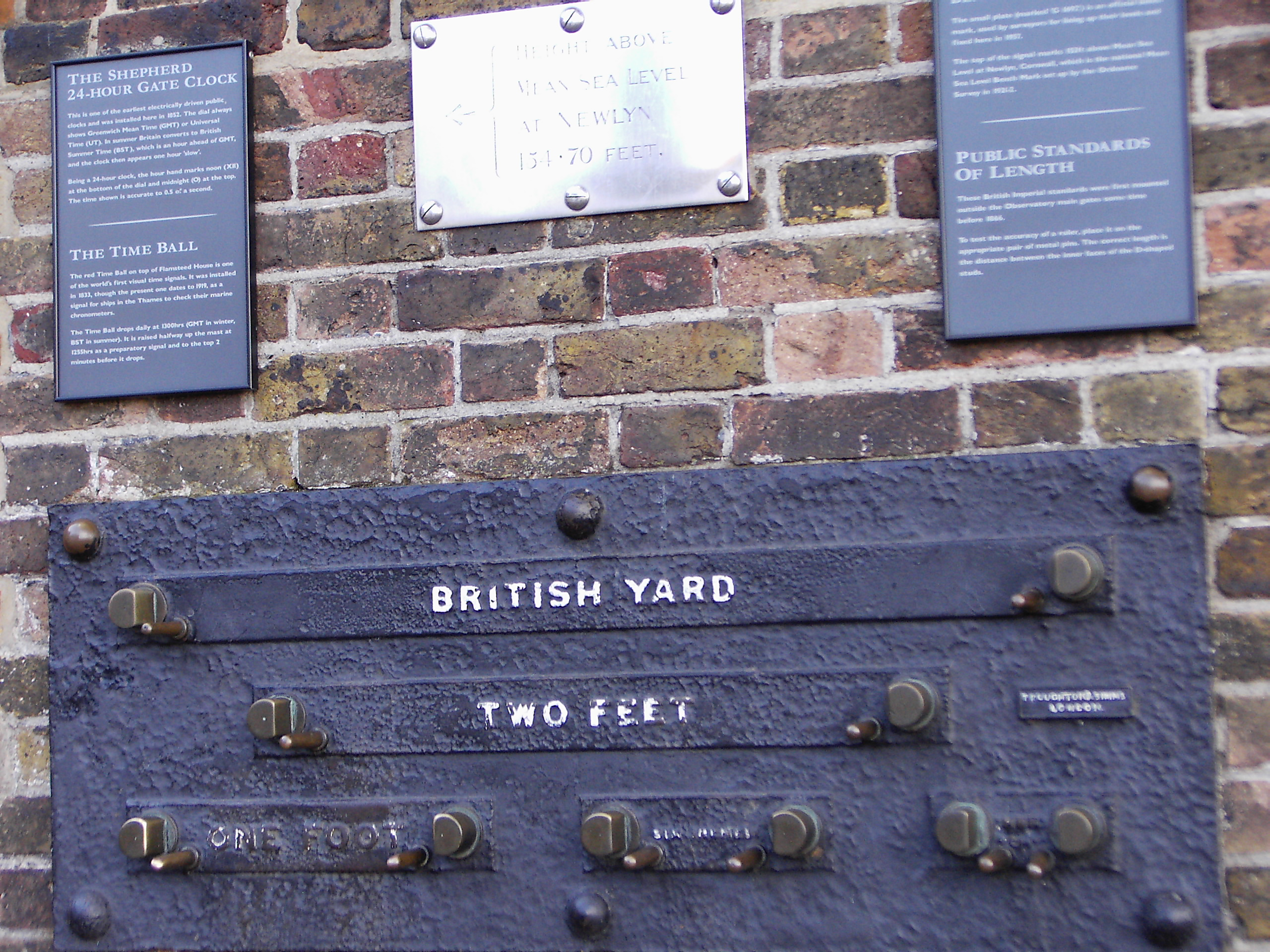
Yard, foot and inch measurements at the Royal Observatory, London. The British public commonly measure distance in miles and yards, height in feet and inches, weight in stone and pounds, speed in miles per hour.

Use of the British imperial system of measure, particularly among the public, is widespread in the United Kingdom and is in many cases permitted by the law. Human height and weight, long distances and speed are measured in imperial units by the vast majority of Brits. A Brit would normally give their weight as "12 and a half stone" rather than 80 kilograms, though younger people increasingly use kilograms rather than stone. Body height is usually given in feet and inches. Younger generations tend to use more metric units of measurement, creating a generational gap, for example in short distances and item weight. Although the majority of Brits now use degrees Celsius to measure temperature, the use of Fahrenheit persists in older generations. Distances shown on road signs must be in miles and yards, while miles per hour appear on speed limit signs and car speedometers.

Britain has been transitioning to metric since 1965, when the UK Government announced financial support for metrication with a target of 10 years. When the UK joined the European Economic Community in 1973, the UK re-affirmed its commitment to metrication, but in 2007, the European Commission abandoned completely the deadline for full metrication in the UK.

=== Driving ===
By custom and law, traffic in Britain drives on the left. Research shows that countries driving on the left have a lower collision rate than those that drive on the right, and it has been suggested that this is partly because the predominantly better-performing right eye is used to monitor oncoming traffic and the driver's wing mirror. The name of the zebra crossing is attributed to British MP and subsequent Prime Minister, James Callaghan, who in 1948 visited the Transport Research Laboratory which was working on a new idea for safe pedestrian crossings. On being shown a design he is said to have remarked that it resembled a zebra. Located in Birmingham, the Gravelly Hill Interchange's colloquial name "Spaghetti Junction" was coined by journalists from the Birmingham Evening Mail on 1 June 1965. In 1971, the Green Cross Code was introduced to teach children safer road crossing habits. From 1987, Mungo Jerry's song "In the Summertime" featured in drink driving adverts. The building of roundabouts (circular junctions) grew rapidly in the 1960s; there are now more than 10,000 in the UK The Cat's eye retroreflective safety device used in road marking was invented by Percy Shaw in 1933.

== Cuisine ==
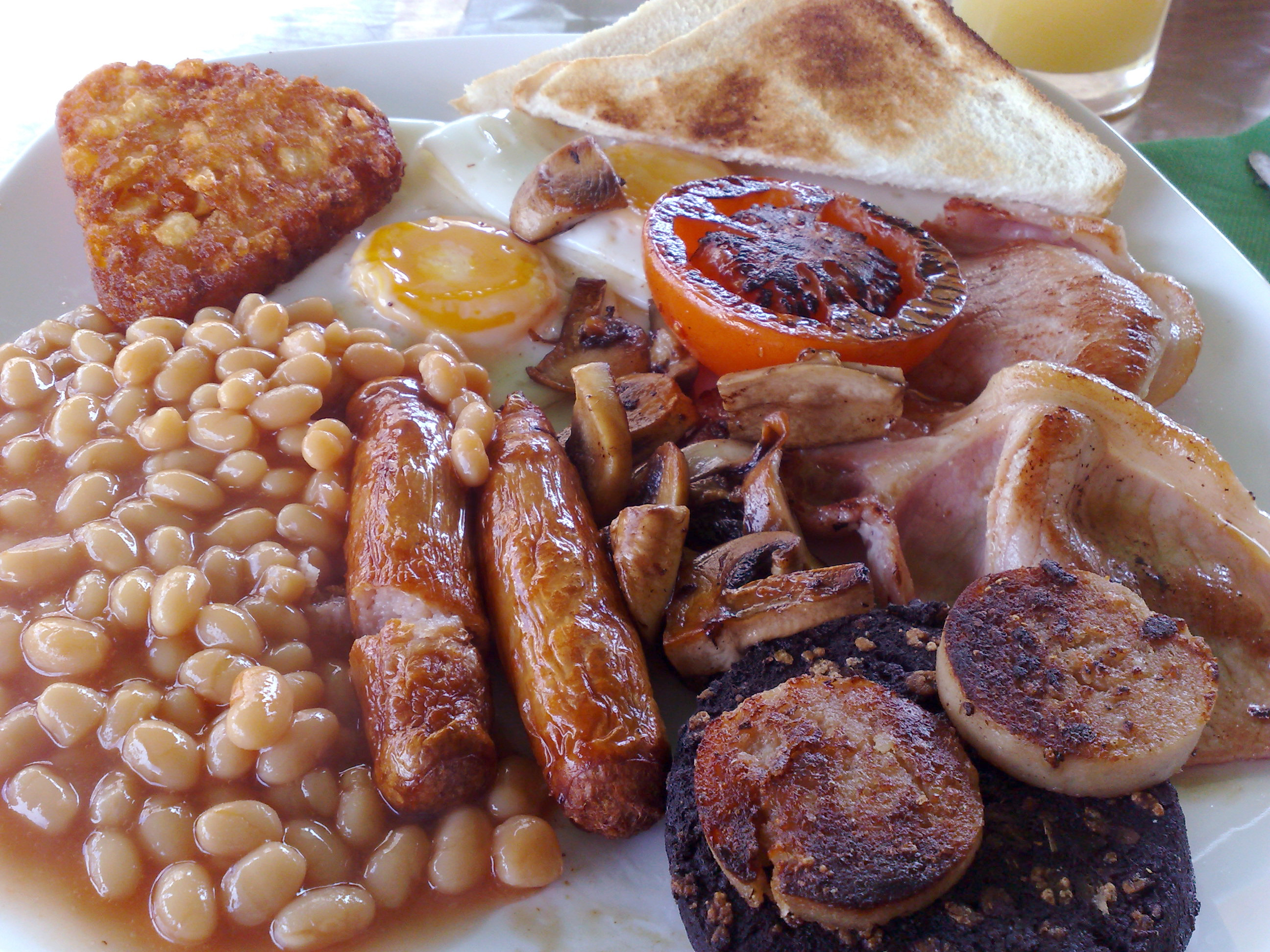
The full breakfast is among the best known British dishes, consisting of fried egg, sausage, bacon, mushrooms, baked beans, toast, fried tomatoes, and sometimes white or black pudding.

British cuisine is the specific set of cooking traditions and practices associated with the United Kingdom. Historically, British cuisine meant "unfussy dishes made with quality local ingredients, matched with simple sauces to accentuate flavour, rather than disguise it". International recognition of British cuisine was historically limited to the full breakfast and the Christmas dinner. However, Celtic agriculture and animal breeding produced a wide variety of foodstuffs for indigenous Celts. Anglo-Saxon England developed meat and savoury herb stewing techniques before the practice became common in Europe. The Norman Conquest introduced exotic spices into Great Britain in the Middle Ages. The British Empire facilitated a knowledge of India's food tradition of "strong, penetrating spices and herbs".

Each country within the United Kingdom has its own specialities. Traditional examples of English cuisine include the Sunday roast; featuring a roasted joint, usually roast beef (a signature English national dish dating back to the 1731 ballad "The Roast Beef of Old England"), lamb or chicken, served with assorted boiled or roasted vegetables, Yorkshire pudding and gravy. The full English breakfast consists of bacon, grilled tomatoes, fried bread, baked beans, fried mushrooms, sausages and eggs. Black pudding and hash browns are often also included. It is usually served with tea or coffee. The Ulster version – Ulster fry – includes soda farl and potato bread, with the BBC's Simon Majumdar calling it the UK's best full breakfast.

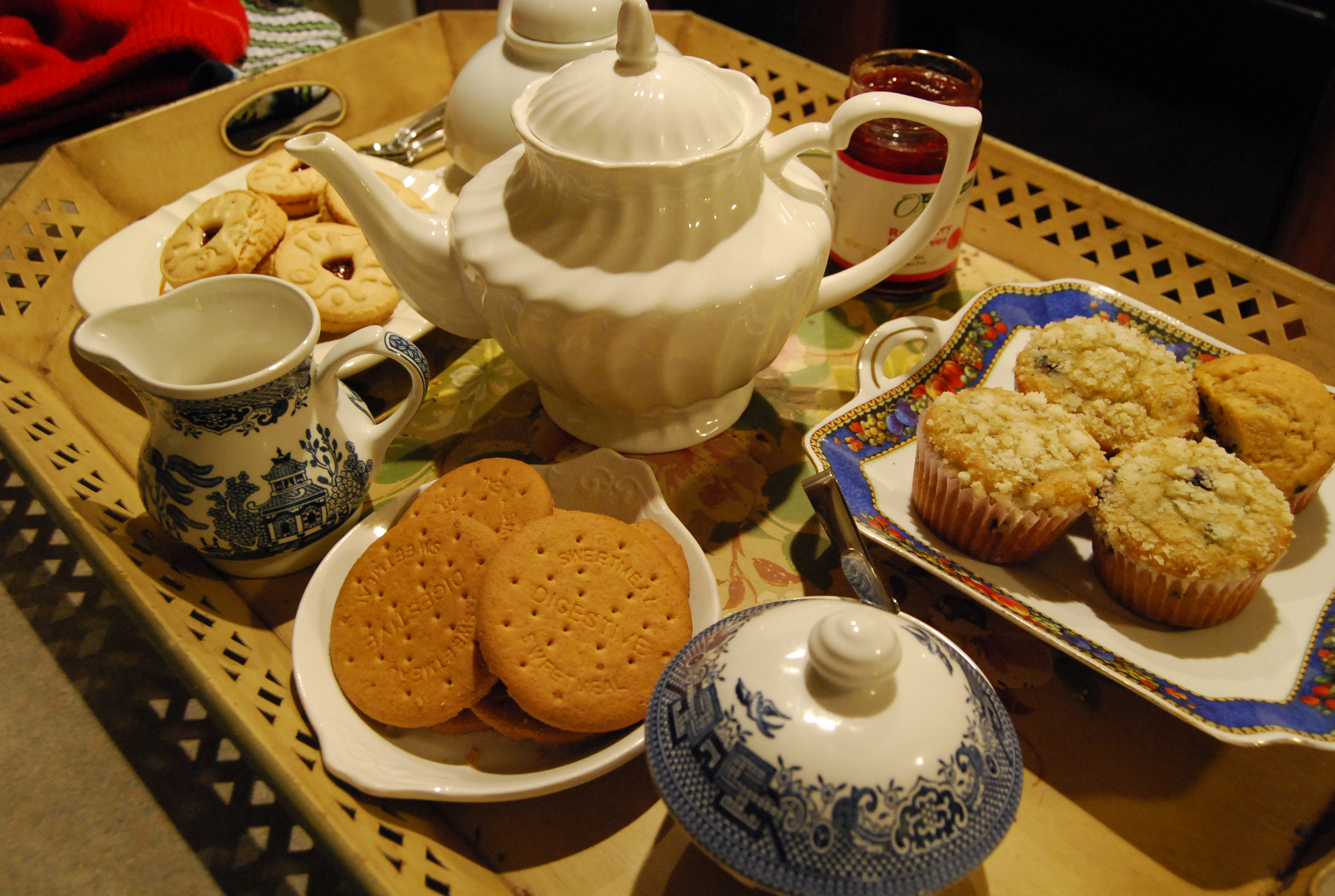
Tea, biscuits, jam and cakes. Tea is the most popular beverage in the UK.

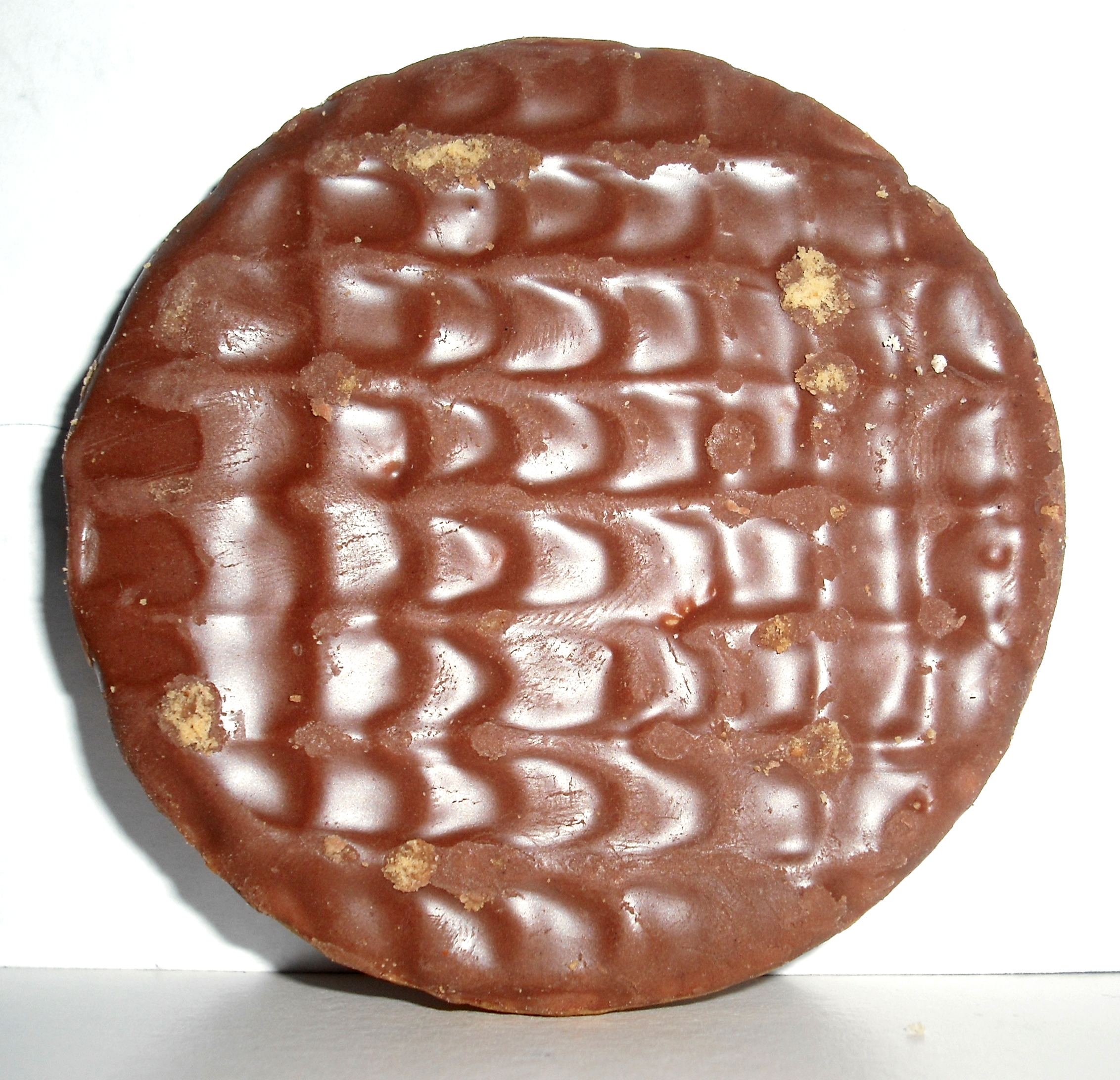
McVitie's chocolate digestive is routinely ranked the UK's favourite snack, and No. 1 biscuit to dunk in tea.

Fish and chips are also regarded as a national institution: Winston Churchill called them "the good companions", John Lennon smothered them in tomato ketchup, while George Orwell referred to them as a "chief comfort" of the working class. The meal was created in 1860 in the East End of London by a Jewish immigrant, Joseph Malin, who came up with the idea of combining fried fish with chips. A blue plaque at Oldham's Tommyfield Market marks the 1860s origin of the fish and chip shop and fast food industries. Various meat pies are consumed such as steak and kidney pie, shepherd's pie, cottage pie, Cornish pasty and pork pie.

A quintessential British custom, afternoon tea, is a small meal typically eaten between 4 pm and 6 pm. The most popular drink in Britain, tea became more widely drunk due to Catherine of Braganza. It is traditionally accompanied with biscuits, sandwiches, scones, cakes or pastries (such as Battenberg cake, fruit cake or Victoria sponge). In his 1946 essay "A Nice Cup of Tea", author George Orwell wrote: "Tea is one of the mainstays of civilisation in this country." McVitie's are the best selling biscuit brand in the UK, and the most popular biscuits to "dunk" in tea, with McVitie's chocolate digestives, rich tea and hobnobs ranked the nation's top three favourite biscuits. Other popular British biscuits include bourbons, custard creams, Jammie Dodgers, ginger nuts and shortbread. The first documented figure-shaped biscuits (gingerbread man) was at the court of Elizabeth I in the 16th century.

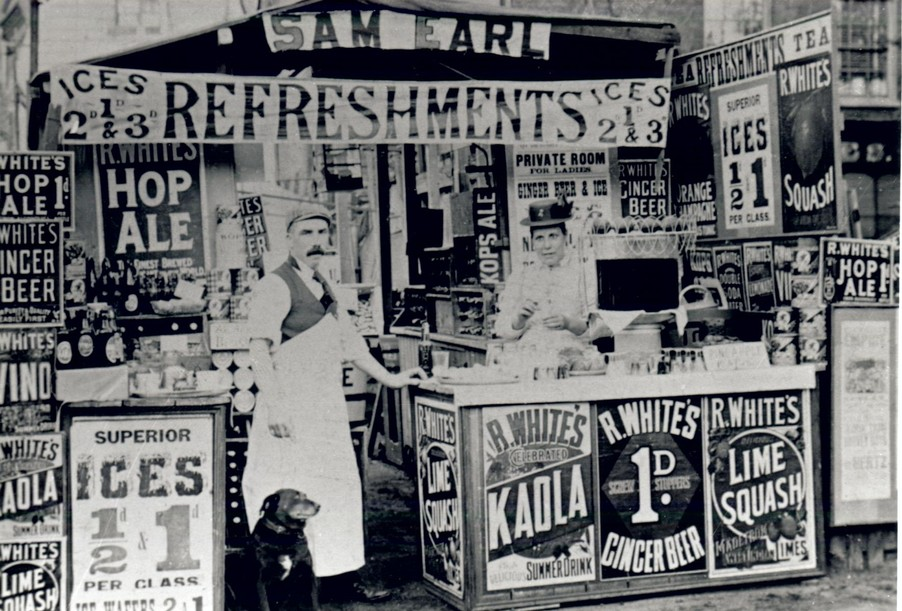
R. White's soft drinks sold in London. Selling carbonated lemonade in 1845, by 1887 they sold strawberry soda, raspberry soda and cherryade.

The first English recipe for ice cream was published in Mrs. Mary Eales's Receipts in London in 1718, and arguably the earliest reference to an edible ice cream cone, appears in Charles Elmé Francatelli's 1846 The Modern Cook. The 18th-century English aristocrat John Montagu, 4th Earl of Sandwich is best known for his links to the modern concept of the sandwich which was named after him. When he ordered his valet to bring him meat tucked between two pieces of bread, others began to order "the same as Sandwich!". In the city of Leeds in 1767, Joseph Priestley made his "happiest" discovery when he invented carbonated water (also known as soda water), the major and defining component of most soft drinks. Carbonated lemonade was available in British refreshment stalls in 1833, with R. White's Lemonade sold in 1845. By 1887 they sold a wide variety of soft drink flavours. Irn-Bru is the best-selling soft drink in Scotland. Invented by a Newcastle pharmacist in 1927, Lucozade is the No. 1 sports drink in the UK.

Sausages are commonly eaten as bangers and mash, in sausage rolls or as toad in the hole. Lancashire hotpot is a well-known stew. Popular cheeses include Cheddar and Wensleydale. Sweet British dishes include scones, apple pie, mince pies, spotted dick, Eccles cakes, pancakes, sponge cake, trifle, jelly, custard, sticky toffee pudding, Tunnock's teacake, and Jaffa cakes; the best-selling cake in the UK. Marmalade is a popular British spread for toast or sandwich: a spread famous for its association with Paddington Bear, a beloved bear in British culture that featured in the critically acclaimed films Paddington (2014) and Paddington 2 (2017).

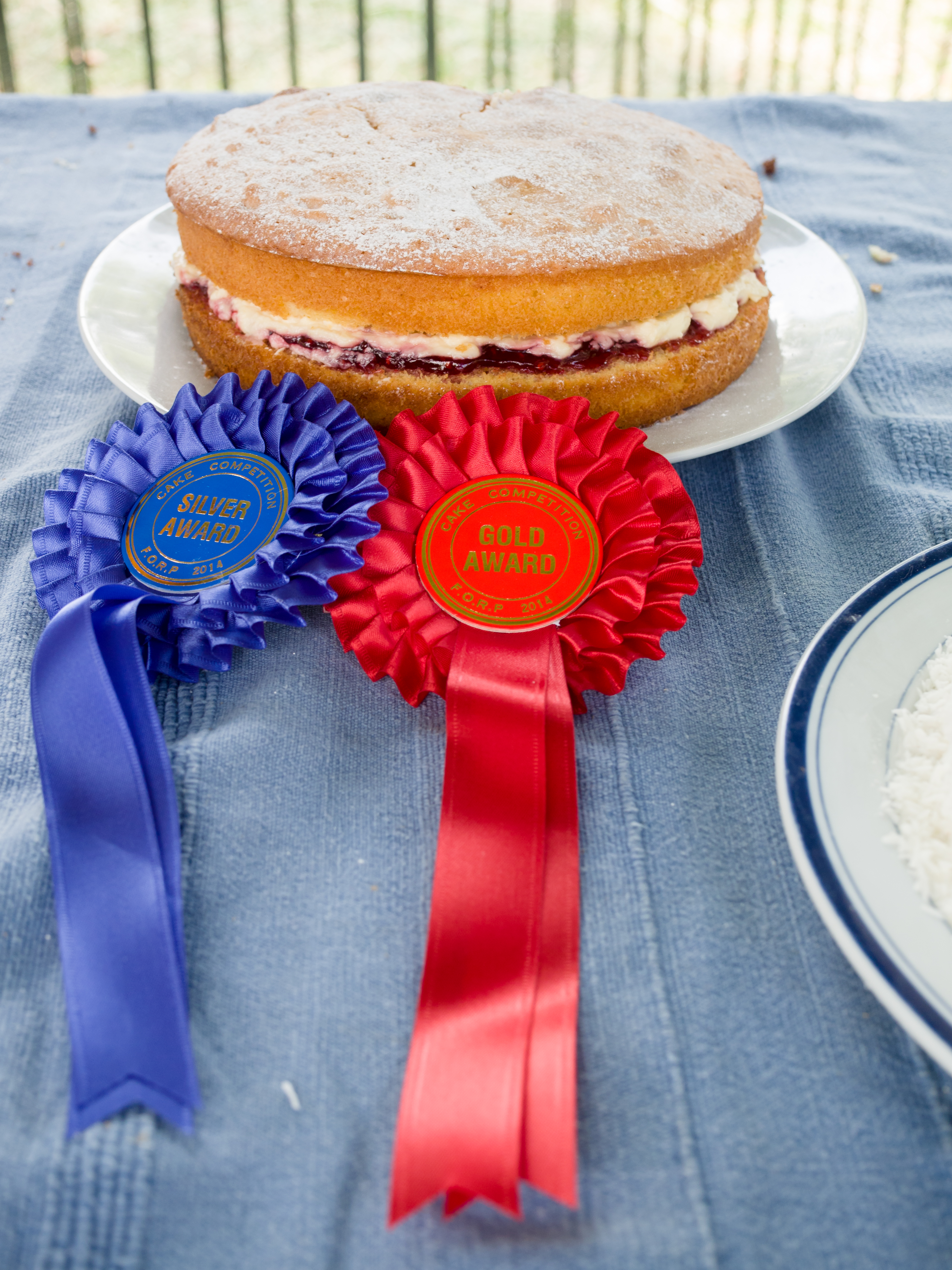
An award-winning Victoria sponge from an English village fête. Competitive baking is part of the traditional village fête, inspiring The Great British Bake Off television series.

Home baking has always been a significant part of British home cooking. Influential cookbooks include The Experienced English Housekeeper (1769), Modern Cookery for Private Families (1845) by food author Eliza Acton that introduced the now-universal practice of listing ingredients and giving suggested cooking times for each recipe, and Isabella Beeton's Book of Household Management (1861). Home-made cakes and jams are part of the traditional English village fête. Filmed in bunting-draped marquees in scenic gardens, the success of the 2010s television show The Great British Bake Off (which was inspired by the village fête) is credited with spurring a renewed interest in home baking, with supermarkets and department stores in the UK reporting sharp rises in sales of baking ingredients and accessories. A popular cake to bake, Victoria sponge (named after Queen Victoria who enjoyed a slice with her tea), was created following the discovery of baking powder by English food manufacturer Alfred Bird in 1843, which enabled the sponge to rise higher in cakes.

The hot cross bun is a popular British sweet bun traditionally eaten on Good Friday, but are now eaten all year round. Treacle tart was created after the invention of golden syrup by chemists working for Abram Lyle in 1885. With its logo and green-and-gold packaging having remained almost unchanged since then, Lyle's Golden Syrup was listed by Guinness World Records as having the world's oldest branding and packaging. Scottish cuisine includes Arbroath smokie and haggis; Northern Irish cuisine features the Ulster fry and the pastie and Welsh cuisine is noted for Welsh rarebit (often using Worcestershire sauce) and cawl. Brown sauce is a traditional British condiment, with its best known variety HP Sauce (named after and featuring an image of the Houses of Parliament on the label) a popular spread on chicken and bacon sandwiches. The Scottish Aberdeen Angus is a popular native beef breed, accounting for almost 20% of the UK beef industry. Cavendish bananas were cultivated by Sir Joseph Paxton in the greenhouses of Chatsworth House, Derbyshire in 1836. Named after William Cavendish, they make up the vast majority of bananas consumed in the western world.

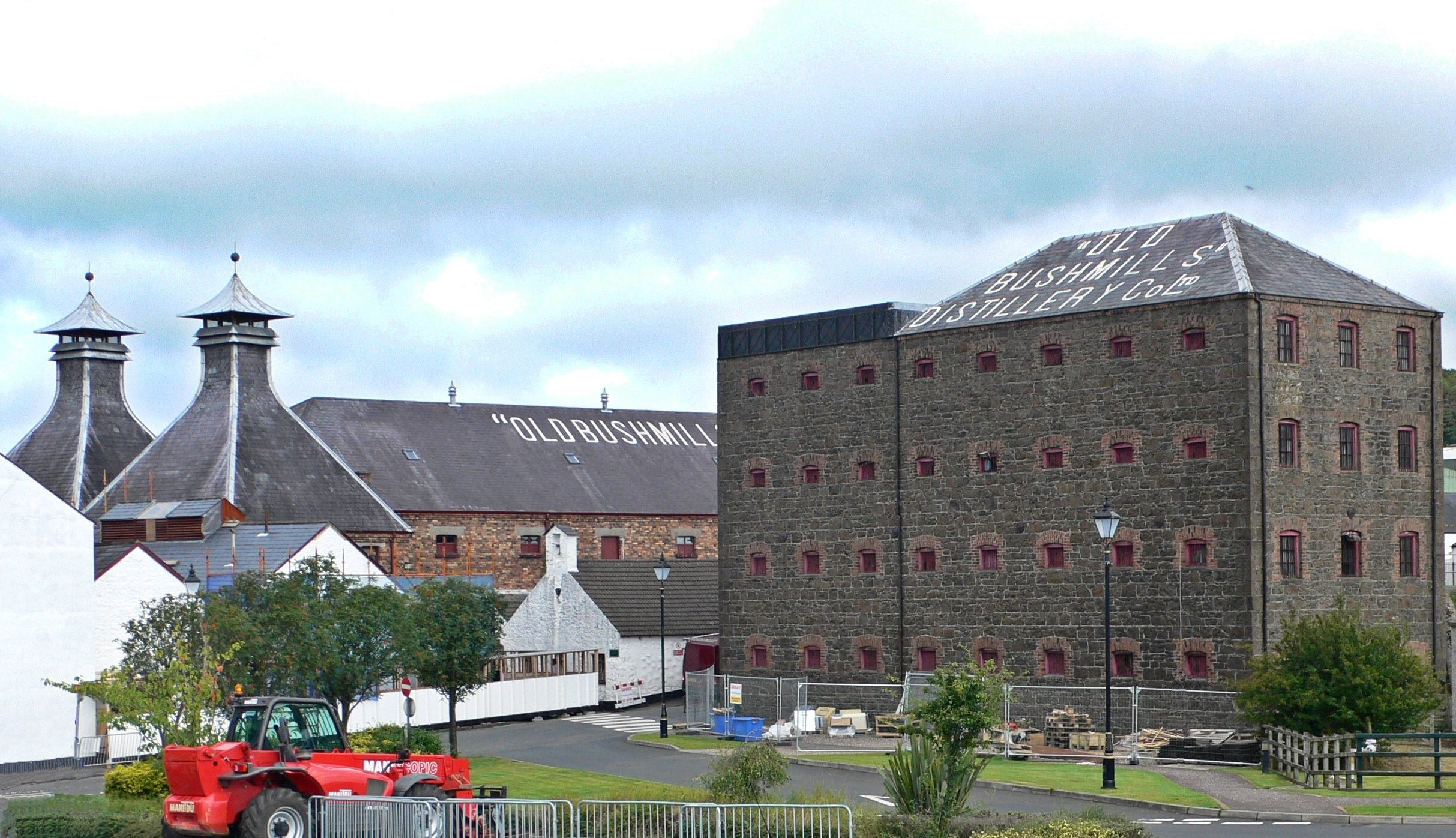
Old Bushmills Distillery, County Antrim, Northern Ireland. Founded in 1608, it is the oldest licensed whiskey distillery in the world.

The pub is an important aspect of British culture, and is often the focal point of local communities. Referred to as their "local" by regulars, pubs are typically chosen for their proximity to home or work, the availability of a particular beer or ale or a good selection, good food, a social atmosphere, the presence of friends and acquaintances, and the availability of pub games such as darts or snooker. Pubs will often screen sports events, such as English Premier League and Scottish Premier League games (or for international tournaments, the FIFA World Cup). The pub quiz was established in the UK in the 1970s.

Initially created to draw in pre-literate drinkers, in 1393, Richard II introduced a law that pubs had to display a sign outdoors to make them easily visible for passing ale tasters who would assess the quality of ale sold. Most pubs still have decorated signs hanging over their doors. The owner or tenant (licensee) is known as the pub landlord or publican, while barmaids are a common feature in pubs. Alcoholic drinks served in pubs include wines and English beers such as bitter, mild, stout and brown ale. Whisky originated in Ireland and Scotland in the Middle Ages: Irish whiskey and Scotch whisky.

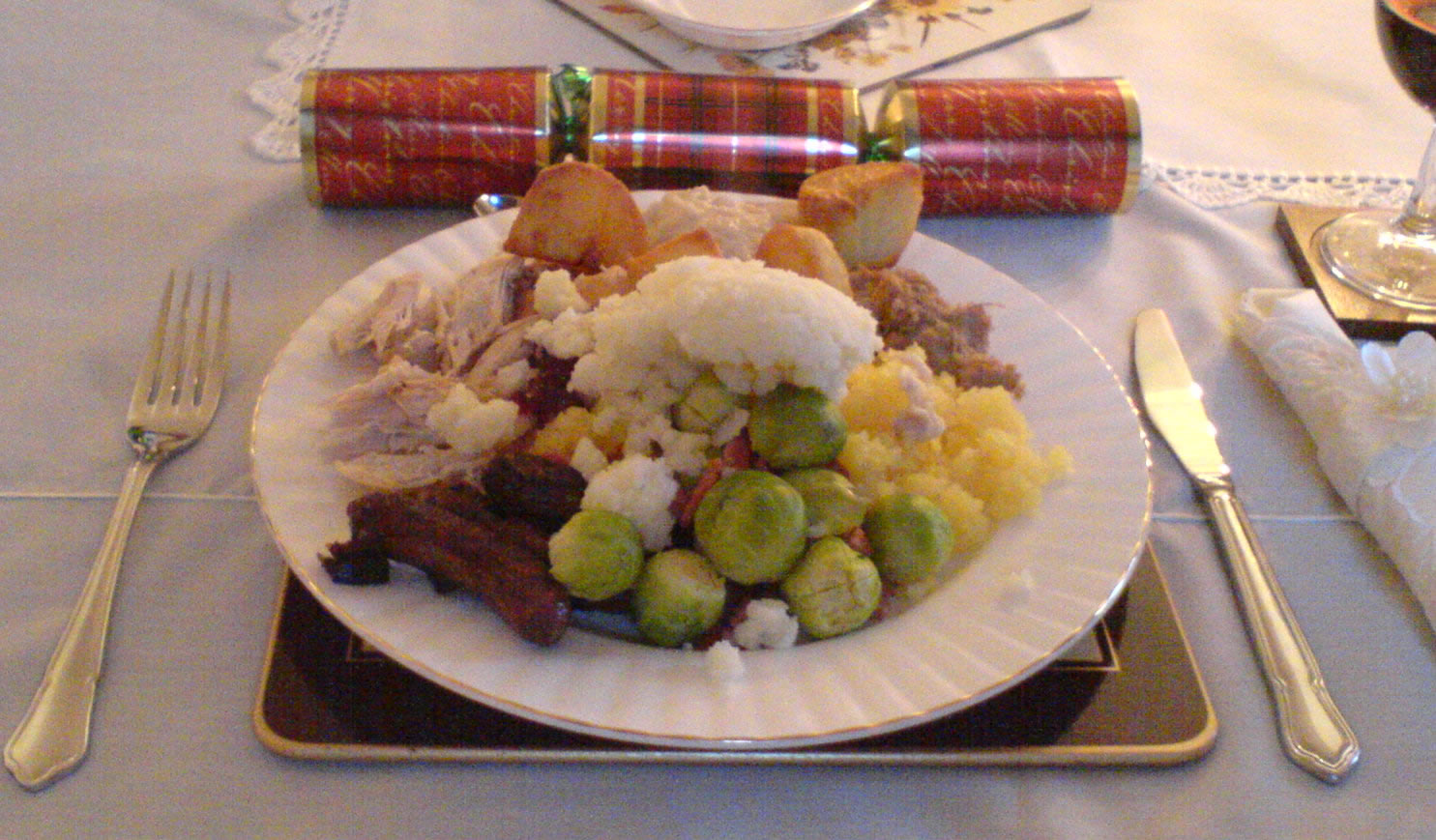
A Christmas dinner plate in Scotland, featuring roast turkey, roast potatoes, mashed potatoes and brussels sprouts

On Christmas Day, goose was previously served at dinner; however since appearing on Christmas tables in England in the late 16th century, the turkey has become more popular, with Christmas pudding served for dessert. The 16th-century English navigator William Strickland is credited with introducing the turkey into England, and 16th-century farmer Thomas Tusser noted that by 1573 turkeys were common in the English Christmas dinner. This custom gave rise to the humorous English idiom, "like turkeys voting for Christmas". The turkey is sometimes accompanied with roast beef or ham, and is served with stuffing, gravy, roast potatoes, mashed potatoes and vegetables. Invented in London in the 1840s, Christmas crackers are an integral part of Christmas celebrations, often pulled before or after dinner, or at parties.

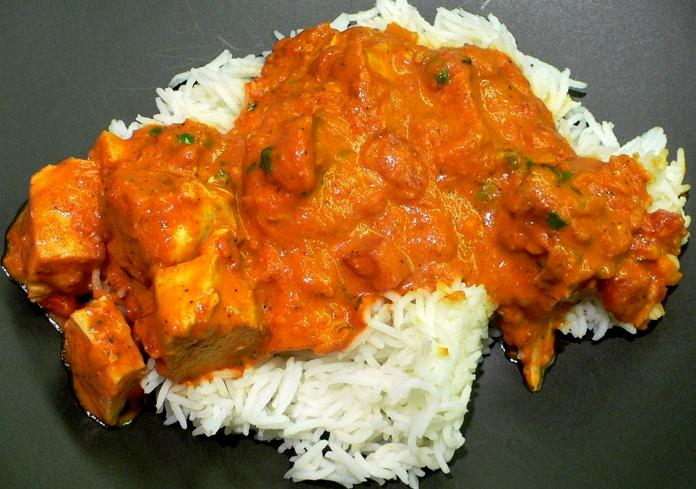
Chicken tikka masala, served atop rice. An Anglo-Indian meal, it is among the UK's most popular dishes.

Chinese restaurants and takeaways (in addition to Indian) are among the most popular ethnic food in the UK. Chinese takeaways are a common sight in towns throughout the UK, and many serve a pseudo-Chinese cuisine based on western tastes (such as chicken fried rice, chips and curry sauce).

The earliest recipe for the crisp ("potato chip") is in English food writer William Kitchiner's 1822 cookbook The Cook's Oracle. In 1920, Frank Smith of The Smiths Potato Crisps Company Ltd packaged a twist of salt with his crisps in greaseproof paper bags, which were sold around London. Crisps remained otherwise unseasoned until an important scientific development in the 1950s. After Archer Martin and Richard Synge (while working in Leeds) received a Nobel Prize for the invention of partition chromatography in 1952, food scientists began to develop flavours via a gas chromatograph, a device that allowed scientists to understand chemical compounds behind complex flavours such as cheese. In 1954, Irish crisps company Tayto produced the first seasoned crisps: Cheese & Onion. Golden Wonder (Smiths' main competitor in Britain) produced their Cheese & Onion version, and Smith's countered with Salt & Vinegar (tested first by their north-east England subsidiary Tudor) which launched nationally in 1967, starting a two-decade-long flavour war. The crisp market in the UK is led by Walkers (who introduced their own flavours in 1954), holding 56% of the market share.

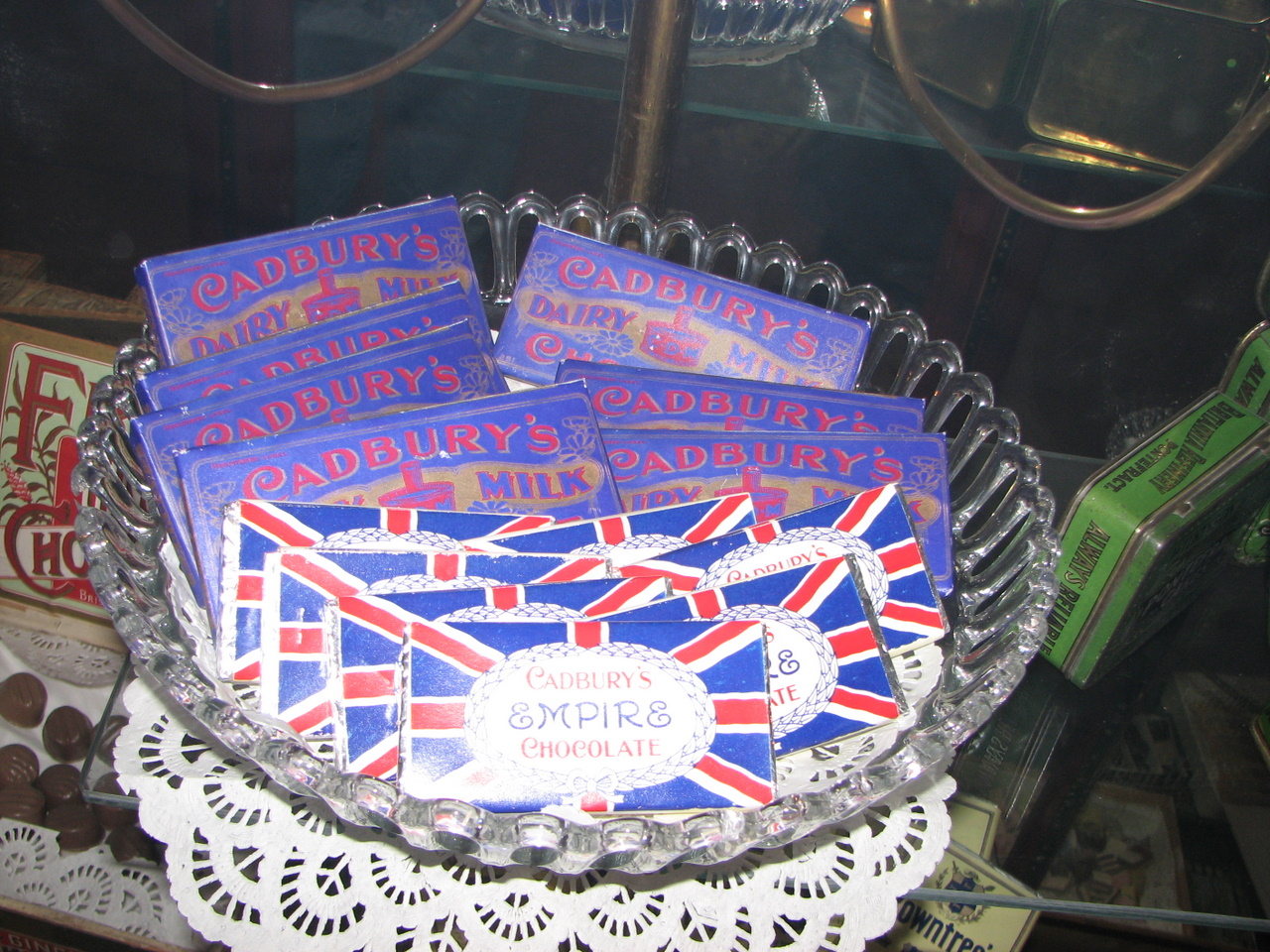
Cadbury chocolate bars (Dairy Milk back of tray), circa 1910

The Quakers, founded by George Fox in 1650s England and described by the BBC as "natural capitalists", had a virtual monopoly in the British chocolate industry for much of the 19th and 20th centuries, led by Cadbury of Birmingham, Fry's of Bristol and Rowntree's and Terry's of York. Fry's produced the first chocolate bar in 1847, which was then mass-produced as Fry's Chocolate Cream in 1866. The chocolate bars Cadbury Dairy Milk, Galaxy and Kit Kat, are the three best selling bars in the UK. Cadbury Creme Eggs are the best selling confectionery item between New Year's Day and Easter in the UK, with annual sales in excess of 200 million. Sponsored by Cadbury, the annual children's Easter egg hunt takes place in over 250 locations in the UK. Created in Doncaster, Yorkshire, Butterscotch boiled sweets is one of the town's best known exports. Created in Lancashire, Jelly Babies are among the British public's favourite sweets. After Eights are a popular after dinner mint. A stick of rock (a hard cylindrical stick-shaped boiled sugar) is a traditional British seaside sweet, commonly sold at seaside resorts throughout the UK such as Brighton, Portrush and Blackpool. A "99 Flake" (commonly called a "99") which consists of ice cream in a cone with a Cadbury Flake inserted in it, is a hugely popular British dessert.

== Sport ==
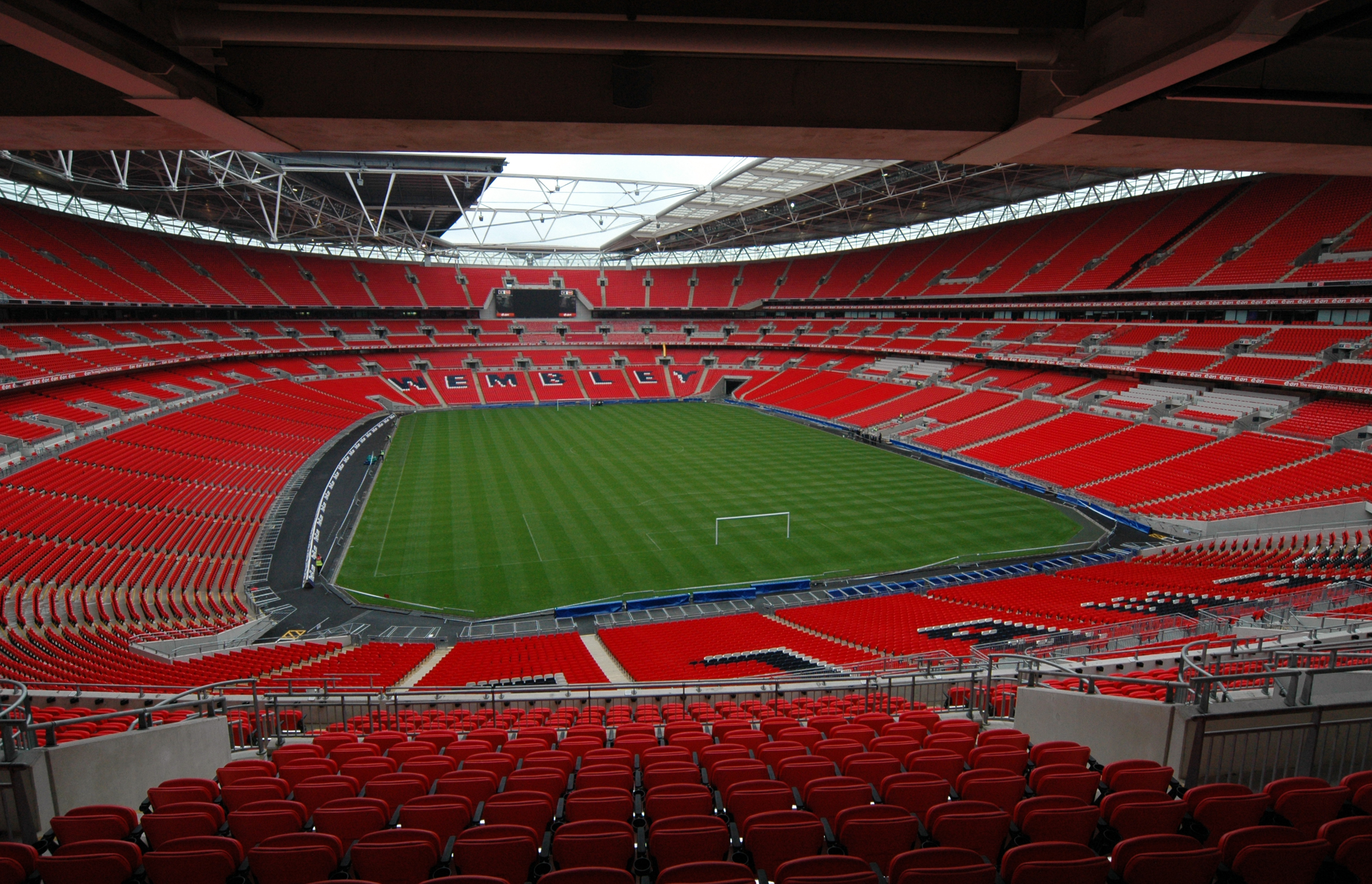
Wembley Stadium, London, home of the England football team and FA Cup finals. Wembley also hosts concerts: Adele's 28 June 2017 concert was attended by 98,000 fans, a stadium record for a music event in the UK.

Most of the major sports have separate administrative structures and national teams for each of the countries of the United Kingdom. Though each country is also represented individually at the Commonwealth Games, there is a single 'Team GB' (for Great Britain) that represents the UK at the Olympic Games. With the rules and codes of many modern sports invented and codified in late 19th-century Victorian Britain, in 2012, IOC President Jacques Rogge stated; "This great, sports-loving country is widely recognised as the birthplace of modern sport. It was here that the concepts of sportsmanship and fair play were first codified into clear rules and regulations. It was here that sport was included as an educational tool in the school curriculum".

=== Football ===
Both in participation and viewing, the most popular sport in the UK is association football. The sport's origin can be traced to English public school football games. The rules were first drafted in England in 1863 by Ebenezer Cobb Morley, and the UK has the oldest football clubs in the world. England is recognised as the birthplace of club football by FIFA, with Sheffield F.C., founded in 1857, the world's oldest football club. The home nations all have separate national teams and domestic competitions, most notably England's Premier League and FA Cup, and the Scottish Premiership and Scottish Cup. The top three Welsh football clubs feature in the English league system. The first international football match was between Scotland and England in 1872. Referred to as the "home of football" by FIFA, England hosted the 1966 FIFA World Cup, and won the tournament. The British television audience for the 1966 World Cup final peaked at 32.30 million viewers, making it the most watched television event ever in the UK.

The four home nations have produced some of the greatest players in the game's history, including, from England, Bobby Moore and Gordon Banks; from Northern Ireland, George Best and Pat Jennings; from Scotland, Kenny Dalglish and Jimmy Johnstone; and from Wales, Ian Rush and Ryan Giggs. The first recipient of the Ballon d'Or, Stanley Matthews was knighted while still a player. The English Premier League (formed in 1992 by member clubs of the old Football League First Division) is the most-watched football league in the world, and its biggest clubs include Manchester United, Liverpool, Arsenal, Chelsea, Tottenham Hotspur and Manchester City. Scotland's Celtic and Rangers also have a global fanbase. Leicester City's 2016 Premier League title win is regarded among the greatest sporting upsets ever.

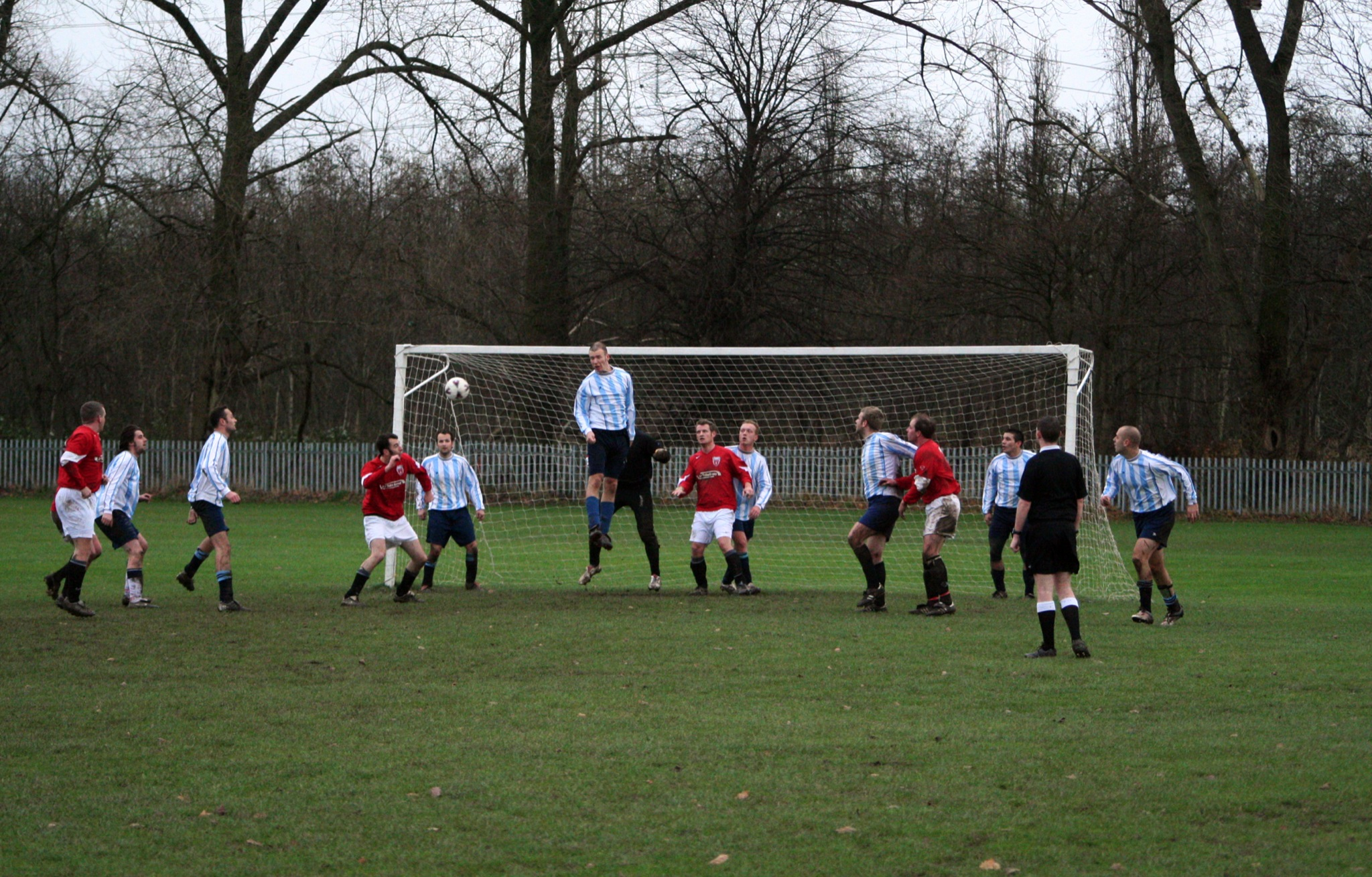
Sunday league football (a form of amateur football). Amateur matches throughout the UK often take place in public parks.

The best-placed teams in the domestic leagues of England and Scotland qualify for Europe's premier competition, the UEFA Champions League (European Cup). Previous winners from the UK are Liverpool, Manchester United, Nottingham Forest, Celtic, Chelsea and Aston Villa. The UEFA Champions League Anthem, written by Tony Britten and based on Handel's Zadok the Priest, is played before each game. Henry Lyte's Christian hymn "Abide with Me" is sung prior to kick-off at every FA Cup Final, a tradition since 1927.

The practice of "jumpers for goalposts" alludes to street/park football in the UK where jumpers would be placed on the ground and used as goalposts. This practice was referenced by singer Ed Sheeran in his DVD Jumpers for Goalposts: Live at Wembley Stadium as a nod to playing concerts at Wembley Stadium, the home of English football. Early references to dribbling come from accounts of medieval football games in England. Geoffrey Chaucer offered an allusion to such ball skills in 14th-century England. In The Knight's Tale (from the Canterbury Tales) he uses the following line: "rolleth under foot as doth a ball".

"Cwm Rhondda"
"You're Not Singing Any More" chants are sung to the Welsh hymn.

Football in Britain is renowned for the intense rivalries between clubs and the passion of the supporters, which includes a tradition of football chants, which are one of the last remaining sources of an oral folk song tradition in the UK. Chants include "You're Not Singing Any More" (or its variant "We Can See You Sneaking Out!"), sung by jubilant fans towards the opposition fans who have gone silent (or left early). Many teams in the UK have their own club anthem or have a song closely associated with them, for example "You'll Never Walk Alone" by Liverpool-based rock band Gerry and the Pacemakers, and "Local Hero" by Dire Straits frontman and Newcastle United fan Mark Knopfler, is played before the start of every Liverpool and Newcastle home game.

Throughout the UK, meat pies (as well as burgers and chips) is a traditional hot food eaten at football games either before kick-off or during half time. The purchase of a football programme (a pre-match magazine produced by the home team that gives details on that day's game, including player profiles, recent form, interviews etc.) is also part of the 'ritual' of attending a football match in the UK. The Football Association dropped its ban on floodlights in 1950, and night games attracted increasingly large crowds of fans–some of them unruly—as well as large television audiences. Architects built bigger stadia, and "their cantilevered constructions dwarfing mean streets, supplanted the cathedral as a symbol of the city's identity and aspirations".

=== Golf ===
The modern game of golf originated in Scotland, with the Fife town of St Andrews known internationally as the "home of golf". and to many golfers the Old Course, an ancient links course dating to before 1574, is considered to be a site of pilgrimage. In 1764, the standard 18 hole golf course was created at St Andrews when members modified the course from 22 to 18 holes. Golf is documented as being played on Musselburgh Links, East Lothian, Scotland as early as 2 March 1672, which is certified as the oldest golf course in the world by Guinness World Records. The oldest known rules of golf were compiled in March 1744 in Leith.

The oldest golf tournament in the world, and the first major championship in golf, The Open Championship, first took place in Ayrshire, Scotland in 1860, and today it is played on the weekend of the third Friday in July. Golf's first superstar Harry Vardon, a member of the fabled Great Triumvirate who were pioneers of the modern game, won the Open a record six times. Since the 2010s, three Northern Irish golfers have had major success; Graeme McDowell, Darren Clarke and four time major winner Rory McIlroy. The biennial golf competition, the Ryder Cup, is named after English businessman Samuel Ryder who sponsored the event and donated the trophy. Sir Nick Faldo is the most successful British Ryder Cup player.

=== Rugby ===
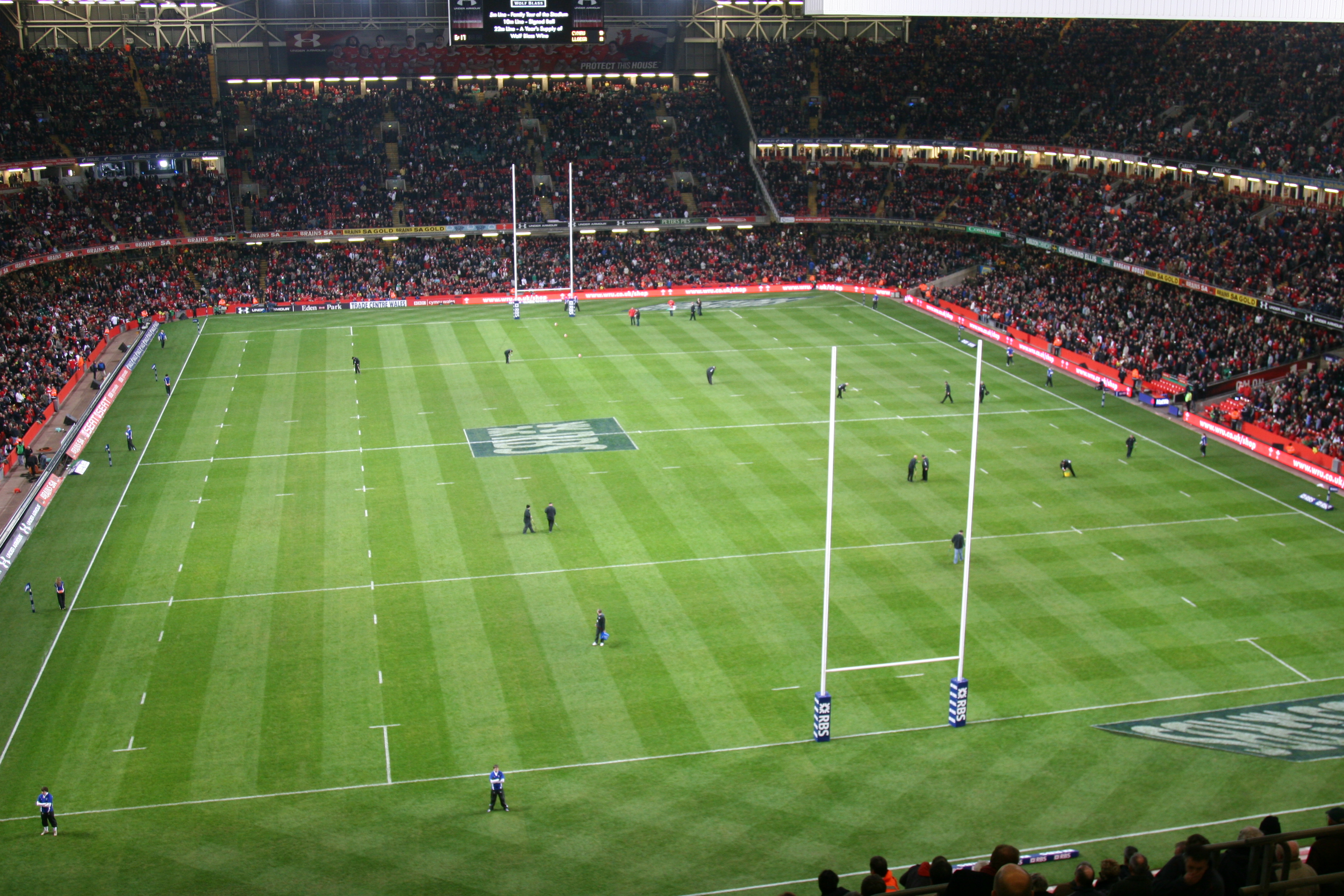
Millennium Stadium, Cardiff, Wales prior to a Wales vs England Six Nations Championship game. The annual rugby union tournament (which includes Scotland and Ireland) takes place over six weeks from late January/early February to mid March.

In 1845, rugby union was created when the first rules were written by pupils at Rugby School, Warwickshire. A former pupil of the school William Webb Ellis, is often fabled with the invention of running with the ball in hand in 1823. The first rugby international took place on 27 March 1871, played between England and Scotland. By 1881 both Ireland and Wales had teams, and in 1883 the first international competition the annual Home Nations Championship took place. In 1888, the Home Nations combined to form what is today called the British and Irish Lions, who now tour every four years to face a Southern Hemisphere team. The Wales team of the 1970s, which included a backline consisting of Gareth Edwards, J. P. R. Williams and Phil Bennett who were known for their feints, sidesteps and attacking running rugby, are regarded as one of the greatest teams in the game – all three players were involved in The greatest try ever scored in 1973. Jonny Wilkinson scored the winning drop goal for England in the last minute of extra time in the 2003 Rugby World Cup final. The major domestic club competitions are the Premiership in England and the Celtic League in Ireland, Scotland, Wales and (since 2010) Italy. Of Cornish origin, the chant "Oggy Oggy Oggy, Oi Oi Oi!" is associated with rugby union (and its personalised variant with football); it inspired the "Maggie Maggie Maggie, Out Out Out!" chant by opponents of Prime Minister Margaret Thatcher in the 1980s. In 1895, rugby league was created in Huddersfield, West Riding of Yorkshire, as the result of a split with the other Rugby code. The Super League is the sports top-level club competition in Britain, and the sport is especially popular in towns in the northern English counties of Yorkshire, Lancashire and Cumbria. The Challenge Cup is the major rugby league cup competition.

=== Tennis ===
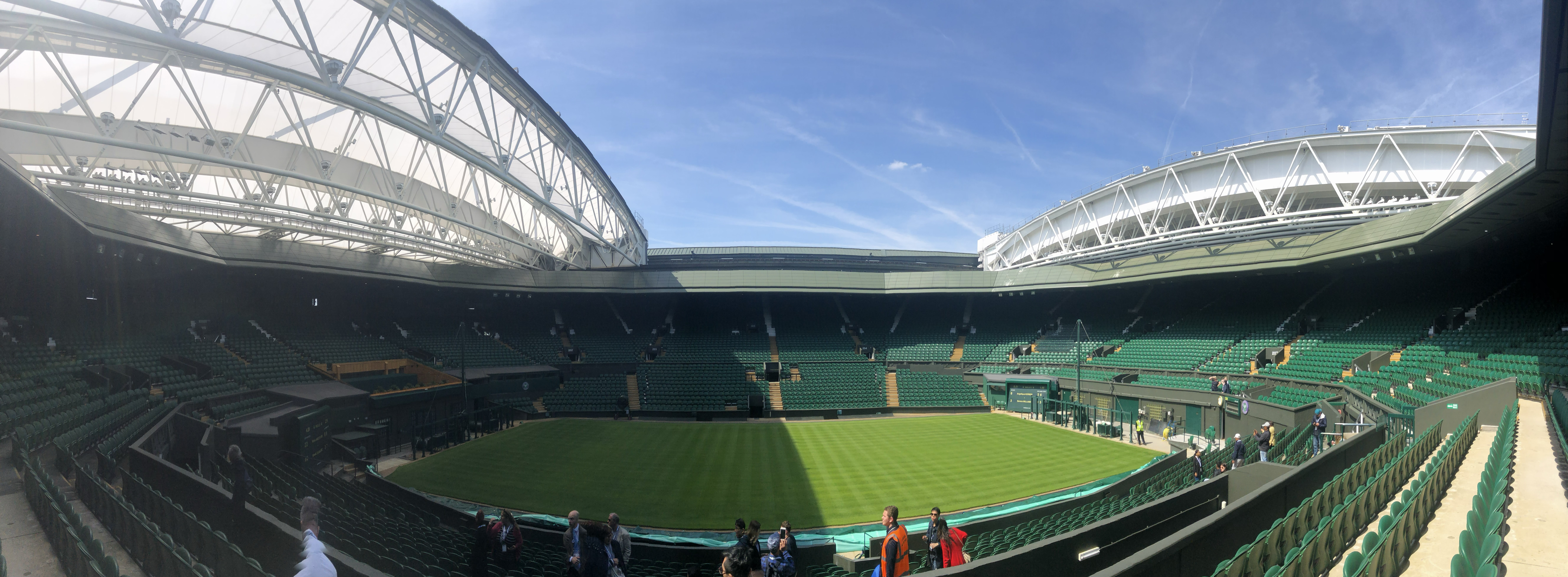
Centre Court at Wimbledon. The world's oldest tennis tournament, it has the longest sponsorship in sport with Slazenger supplying tennis balls to the event since 1902.

The modern game of tennis originated in Birmingham, England in the 1860s, and after its creation, tennis spread throughout the upper-class English-speaking population, before spreading around the world. Major Walter Clopton Wingfield is credited as being a pioneer of the game. The world's oldest tennis tournament, the Wimbledon Championships, first occurred in 1877, and today the event takes place over two weeks in late June and early July. Created in the Tudor period in the court of Henry VIII, the English dessert Strawberries and cream is synonymous with the British summer, and is famously consumed at Wimbledon. The tournament itself has a major place in the British cultural calendar. The eight-time Slam winner and Britain's most successful player Fred Perry is one of only seven men in history to have won all four Grand Slam events, which included three Wimbledons. Virginia Wade won three Grand Slams, the most famous of which was Wimbledon in 1977, the year of the Silver Jubilee of Queen Elizabeth II (the Queen attended Wimbledon for the first time since 1962 to watch the final). The 2013 and 2016 Wimbledon champion, Scotland's Andy Murray, is Britain's most recent male Grand Slam winner. In 2021, Emma Raducanu became the most recent British female Grand Slam winner.

=== Boxing ===
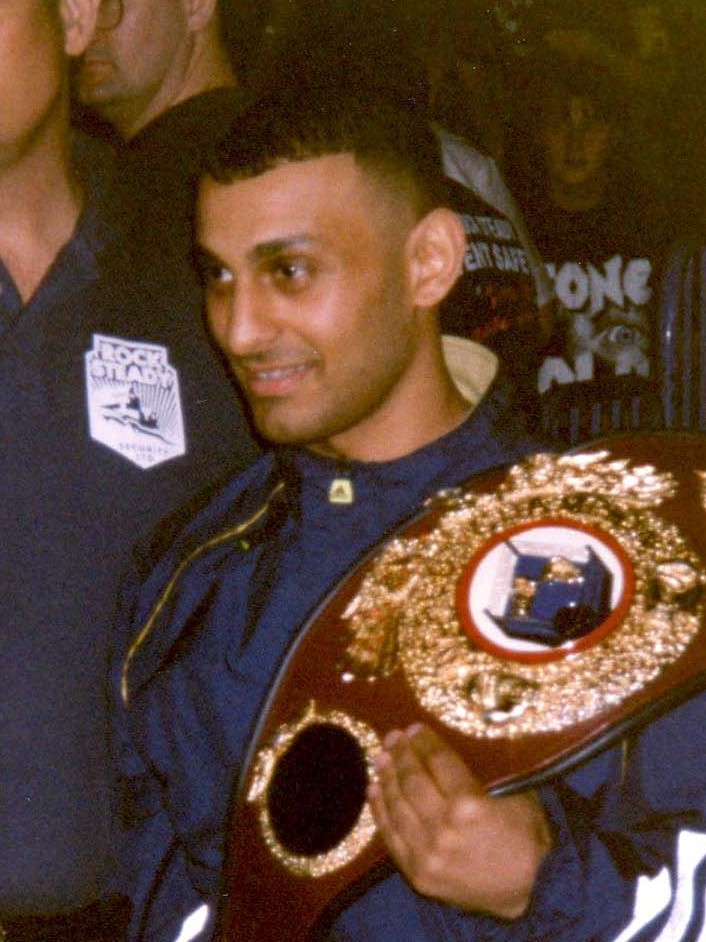
Featherweight champion "Prince" Naseem Hamed was a major name in boxing and 1990s British pop culture.

The 'Queensberry rules', the code of general rules in boxing, was named after John Douglas, 9th Marquess of Queensberry in 1867, that formed the basis of modern boxing. Britain's first heavyweight world champion Bob Fitzsimmons made boxing history as the sport's first three-division world champion. The 1980s saw the emergence of heavyweight Frank Bruno who would become hugely popular with the British public. In the 1990s, Chris Eubank, Nigel Benn, Steve Collins and Michael Watson had a series of fights against each other in the super-middleweight division, drawing audiences of up to 20 million in the UK. Eubank's eccentric personality made him one of the most recognisable celebrities in the UK along with the cocky "Prince" Naseem Hamed. The Nigel Benn vs. Gerald McClellan fight in 1995 drew 13 million. Other big draw fighters in the UK included Lennox Lewis, Joe Calzaghe and Ricky Hatton.

=== Cricket ===
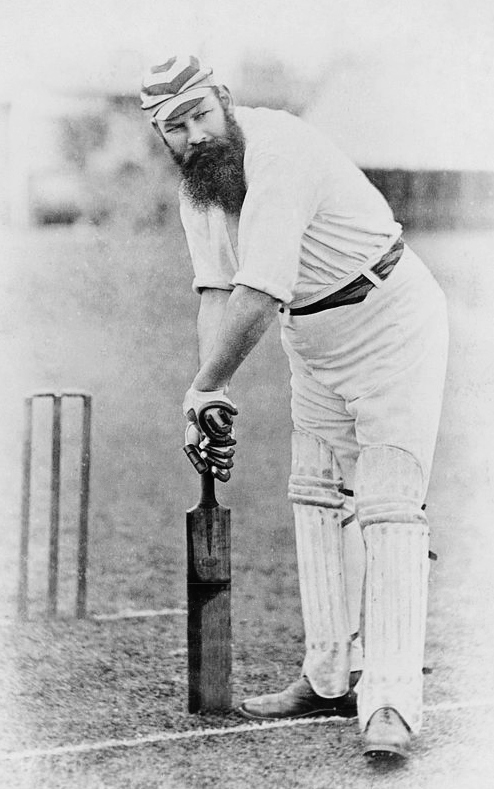
Cricketer W. G. Grace, with his long beard and MCC cap, was the most famous British sportsman in the Victorian era.

The modern game of cricket was created in England in the 1830s when round arm bowling was legalised, followed by the historical legalisation of overarm bowling in 1864. In 1876–77, England took part in the first-ever Test match against Australia. Influential to the development of the sport, W. G. Grace is regarded as one of the greatest cricket players, devising most of the techniques of modern batting. His fame endures; Monty Python and the Holy Grail uses his image as "the face of God" during the sequence in which God sends the knights out on their quest for the grail. The rivalry between England and Australia gave birth to The Ashes in 1882 that has remained Test cricket's most famous contest, and takes place every two years to high television viewing figures. The County Championship is the domestic competition in England and Wales. England have hosted the Cricket World Cup five times, and are the reigning champions, having won in 2019.

=== Horse racing ===
Originating in 17th and 18th-century England, the Thoroughbred is a horse breed best known for its use in horse racing. Horse racing was popular with the aristocrats and royalty of British society, earning it the title "Sport of Kings". Named after Edward Smith-Stanley, 12th Earl of Derby, The Derby was first run in 1780. The race serves as the middle leg of the Triple Crown, preceded by the 2000 Guineas and followed by the St Leger. The name "Derby" has since become synonymous with great races all over the world, and as such has been borrowed many times in races abroad.

The National Hunt horse race the Grand National, is held annually at Aintree Racecourse in early April. It is the most watched horse race in the UK, attracting casual observers, and three-time winner Red Rum is the most successful racehorse in the event's history. Red Rum is the best-known racehorse in the UK, named by 45% of Britons, with Black Beauty (from Anna Sewell's novel) in second with 33%.

Bolton company J.W. Foster and Sons's pioneering running spikes appear in the book, Golden Kicks: The Shoes that changed Sport. They were made famous by 1924 100 m Olympic champion Harold Abrahams who would be immortalised in Chariots of Fire, the British Oscar winning film. Foster's grandsons formed the sportswear company Reebok in Bolton.

=== Motor sports ===
The 1950 British Grand Prix was the first Formula One World Championship race. Britain has produced some of the greatest drivers in Formula One, including Stirling Moss, Jim Clark (twice F1 champion), Graham Hill (only driver to have won the Triple Crown), John Surtees (only world champion in two and four wheels), Jackie Stewart (three-time F1 champion), James Hunt, Nigel Mansell (only man to hold F1 and IndyCar titles at the same time), Jenson Button, Lewis Hamilton (seven-time champion) and 2025 champion, Lando Norris. The British Grand Prix is held at Silverstone every July. Also, the United Kingdom is home to some of the most prestigious teams in Formula One, including McLaren and Williams. It is home to the main bases of 6 out of the 11 Formula 1 teams, Mercedes (Brackley), Alpine (Enstone), Red Bull (Milton Keynes), Mclaren (Woking), Aston Martin (Silverstone) and Williams (Grove). It is also home to the secondary bases of Haas (Banbury) and Cadillac (Silverstone).

=== National sporting events ===
Other major sporting events in the UK include the London Marathon, and The Boat Race on the River Thames. The most successful male rower in Olympic history, Steve Redgrave won gold medals at five consecutive Olympic Games. Cycling is a popular physical activity in the UK. In 1888, inventor Frank Bowden founded the Raleigh Bicycle Company, and by 1913, Raleigh was the biggest bicycle manufacturing company in the world. The Raleigh Chopper was named in the list of British design icons. In 1965 Tom Simpson became the first British world road race champion, and in 2012 Bradley Wiggins became the first British Tour de France winner. Chris Froome has subsequently won the Tour de France four times (2013, 2015, 2016 and 2017). Welsh cyclist Geraint Thomas won in 2018. Sprint specialist Mark Cavendish has won thirty-five Tour de France stages, putting him first on the all-time list.

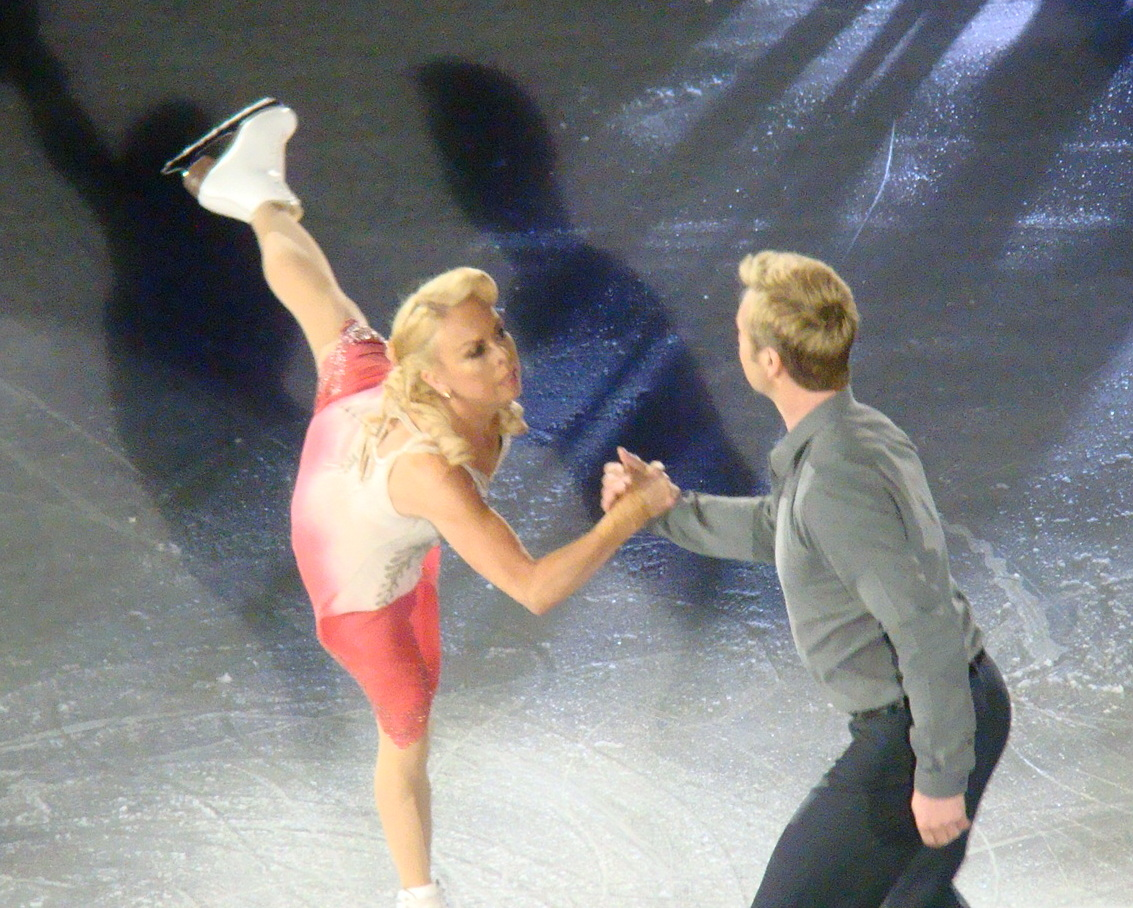
Ice dancers Torvill and Dean in 2011. Their historic gold medal-winning performance at the 1984 Winter Olympics was watched by a British television audience of more than 24 million people.

In Ice Dance, many of the compulsory moves were developed by dancers from the UK in the 1930s. At the 1984 Winter Olympics, Jayne Torvill and Christopher Dean won ice dancing gold with the highest-ever score for a single programme. The pair received perfect 6.0 scores from every judge for artistic impression, and twelve 6.0s and six 5.9s overall.

At the 1988 Winter Olympics, ski jumper Eddie "The Eagle" Edwards gained fame as an underdog. Eddie was portrayed by Taron Egerton in the 2016 biographical sports comedy-drama film Eddie the Eagle.

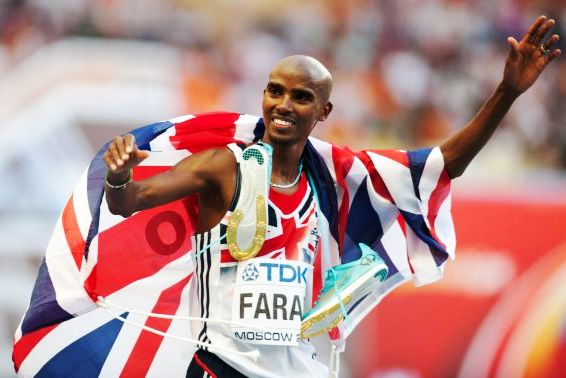
Mo Farah is the most successful British track athlete in modern Olympic Games history, winning the 5000 m and 10,000 m events at two Olympic Games.

A great number of major sports originated in the United Kingdom, including association football, golf, tennis, boxing, rugby league, rugby union, cricket, field hockey, snooker, darts, billiards, squash, curling and badminton, all of which are popular in Britain. Another sport invented in the UK was baseball, and its early form rounders is popular among children in Britain. Snooker and darts are popular indoor games: Stephen Hendry is the seven time world snooker champion, Phil Taylor is the 16 time world darts champion. Snooker player Alex Higgins (nicknamed The Hurricane) and darts player Eric Bristow (nicknamed The Crafty Cockney) are credited with popularising each sport.

Bodybuilder Reg Park was Mr Britain in 1946 and became Mr Universe in 1951, 1958 and 1965. Gaelic football is very popular in Northern Ireland, with many teams from the north winning the All-Ireland Senior Football Championship since the early 2000s. William Penny Brookes was prominent in organising the format for the modern Olympic Games, and in 1994, then IOC President Juan Antonio Samaranch laid a wreath on Brooke's grave, and said, "I came to pay homage and tribute to Dr Brookes, who really was the founder of the modern Olympic Games".

Participation in women's team sport (in addition to profile in the media) has seen a rapid increase in recent years. Popular women's team sports include Netball Superleague formed in 2005, the FA WSL (women's football) formed in 2010 (Kelly Smith is seen as a leading figure in the game), Women's Six Nations Championship in rugby union, and Women's Cricket Super League.

=== Sub-national sports ===
The Highland games are held throughout the year in Scotland as a way of celebrating Scottish and Celtic culture and heritage, especially that of the Scottish Highlands, with more than 60 games taking place across the country every year. Each December, the BBC Sports Personality of the Year is announced, an award given to the best British sportsperson of the year, as voted for by the British public. The public also votes for the BBC Overseas Sports Personality of the Year, presented to a non-British sportsperson considered to have made the most substantial contribution to a sport each year which has also captured the imagination of the British public. Recipients have included Pelé (after winning his third World Cup in 1970), Muhammad Ali (after regaining the heavyweight title in 1974), Jonah Lomu (for his performances at the 1995 Rugby World Cup), Ronaldo (for his comeback in winning the 2002 World Cup), and Roger Federer (for his record eighth Wimbledon in 2017).

== Healthcare ==
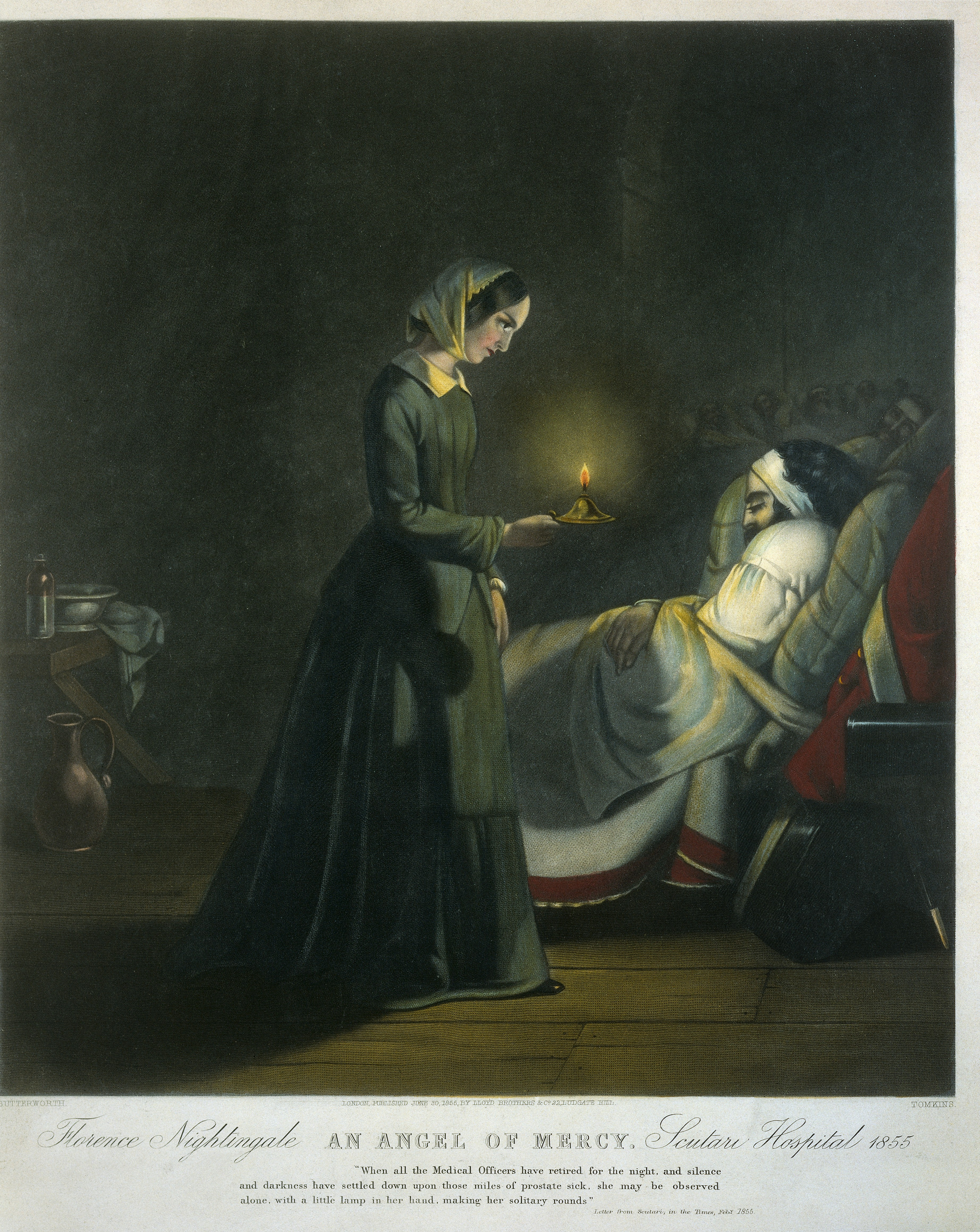
The founder of modern nursing Florence Nightingale tending to a patient in 1855. An icon of Victorian Britain, she is known as The Lady with the Lamp.

Each of the four countries of the UK has a publicly funded health care system referred to as the National Health Service (NHS). The terms "National Health Service" or "NHS" are also used to refer to the four systems collectively. All of the services were founded in 1948, based on legislation passed by the Labour Government that had been elected in 1945 with a manifesto commitment to implement the Beveridge Report recommendation to create "comprehensive health and rehabilitation services for prevention and cure of disease".

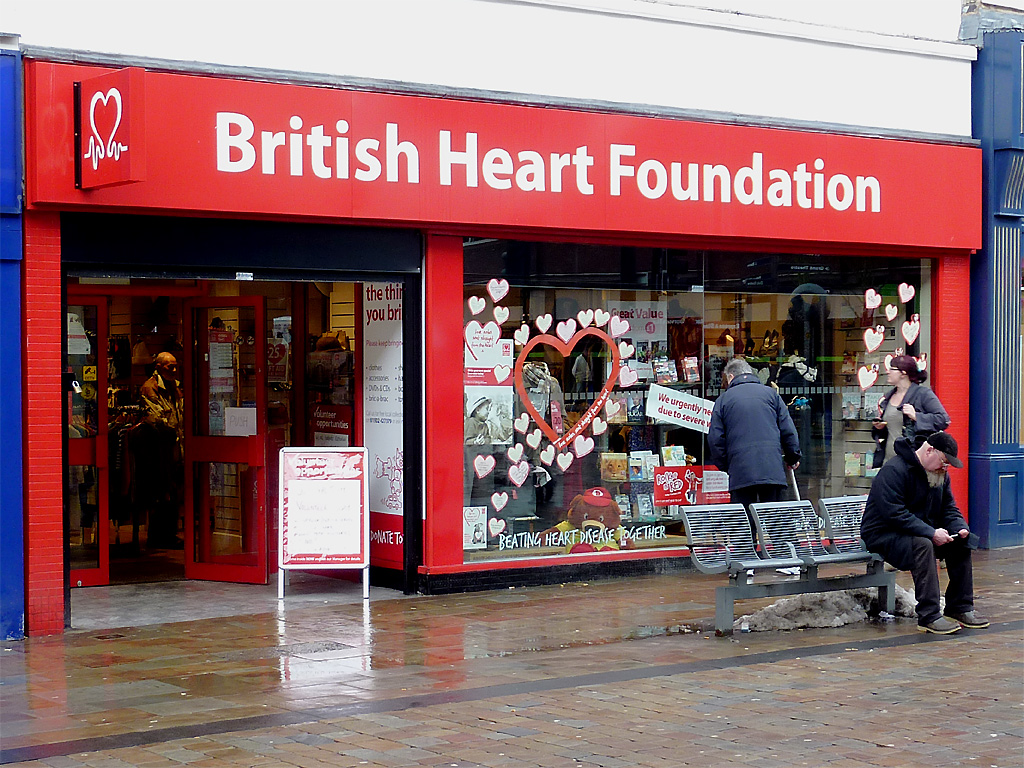
The British Heart Foundation is the biggest funder of cardiovascular research in the UK.

The NHS was born out of a long-held ideal that good healthcare should be available to all, regardless of wealth. At its launch by the then minister of health, Aneurin Bevan, on 5 July 1948, it had at its heart three core principles: That it meet the needs of everyone, that it be free at the point of delivery, and that it be based on clinical need, not ability to pay. The NHS had a prominent slot during the 2012 London Summer Olympics opening ceremony directed by Danny Boyle, being described as "the institution which more than any other unites our nation", according to the programme. Cancer Research UK, Alzheimer's Research UK and Together for Short Lives are among hundreds of health charities in the UK.

Florence Nightingale laid the foundation of modern nursing with the establishment of her nursing school at St Thomas' Hospital in London. It was the first secular nursing school in the world, now part of King's College London. Nightingale wrote Notes on Nursing in 1859. The book served as the cornerstone of the curriculum at the Nightingale School and other nursing schools. The Nightingale Pledge is taken by many new nurses in the US (but not the UK), and the annual International Nurses Day (12 May) is celebrated around the world on her birthday. Her social reforms improved healthcare for all sections of society in the UK and around the world.

== Pets ==
=== Statistics ===
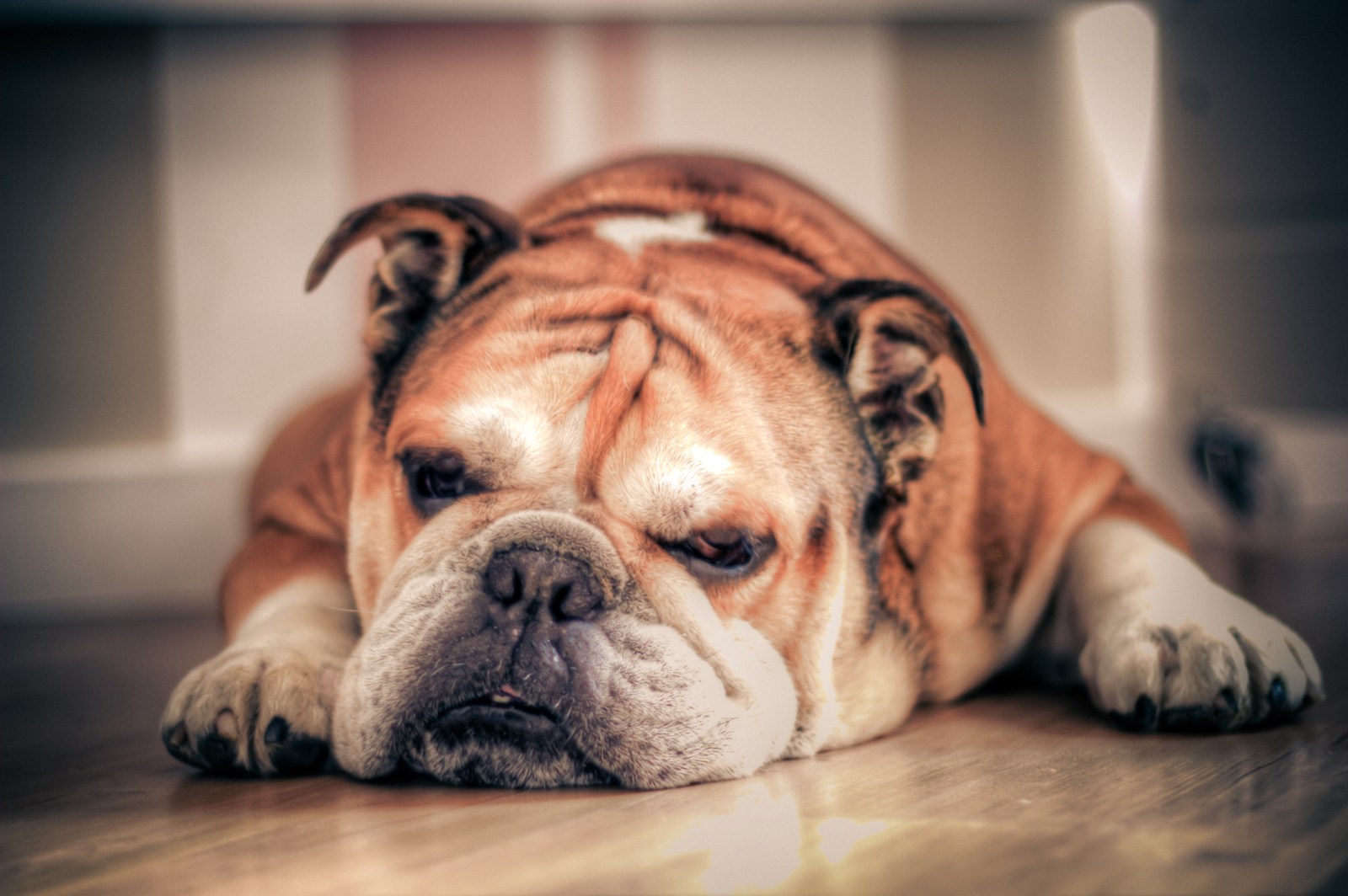
One of Britain's oldest indigenous breeds, the Bulldog is known as the national dog of Great Britain.

In the UK, about 40% of the population own a pet. The top pets in the UK for 2018 and 2019 were:

- Dogs: 25%
- Cats: 17%
- Rabbits, indoor birds, guinea pigs, hamsters: ≈1%
- Tortoises and Turtles: 0.7%
- Lizards: 0.6%

However, the population of pets in the UK declined from 71 million in 2013 (a significant peak) to 51 million in 2018. This decline has seen some reversal as a result of the COVID-19 pandemic; an article published in May 2021 stated that a total of 3.2 million households in the UK had acquired a pet since the start of the pandemic, according to the Pet Food Manufacturers' Association.

=== History ===
Founded in 1824, the Royal Society for the Prevention of Cruelty to Animals (RSPCA) is the oldest and largest animal welfare organisation in the world.

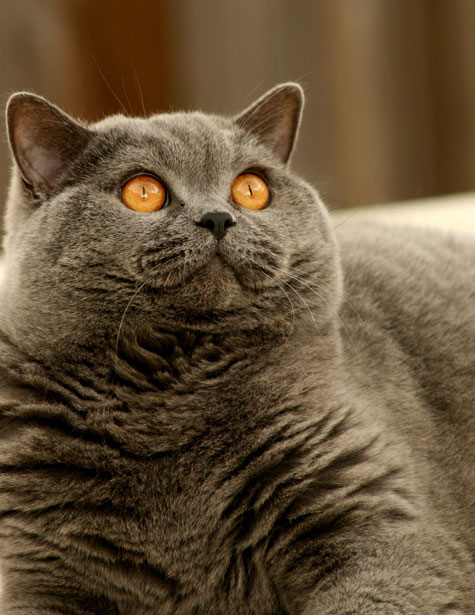
The British Shorthair was an inspiration for the Cheshire Cat in Lewis Carroll's Alice in Wonderland.

The British Shorthair cat is the most popular pedigreed breed in its native country, as registered by the UK's Governing Council of the Cat Fancy (GCCF). The breed's broad cheeks and relatively calm temperament make it a frequent media star. The cat's profile reads: "When gracelessness is observed, the British Shorthair is duly embarrassed, quickly recovering with a 'Cheshire cat smile'". There are almost one million horses and ponies in the UK, with popular native breeds including Clydesdale horse (used as drum horses by the British Household Cavalry), Thoroughbred (used in horse racing), Cleveland Bay (pull carriages in royal processions), Highland pony and Shetland pony.

The UK's indigenous dog breeds include the Bulldog, Jack Russell Terrier, Golden Retriever, Yorkshire Terrier, Cavalier King Charles Spaniel, Airedale Terrier, Beagle, Border Collie, Staffordshire Bull Terrier, English Cocker Spaniel, Scottish Terrier, Welsh Corgi, Bullmastiff, Greyhound, English Springer Spaniel and Old English Sheepdog.

The Kennel Club, with its headquarters in London, is the oldest kennel club in the world, and acts as a lobby group on issues involving dogs in the UK. Its main objectives are to promote the general improvement of dogs and responsible dog ownership. Held since 1891, Crufts is an annual dog show in the UK. The event takes place over four days in early March. In 1928, the very first winner of Best in Show at Crufts was Primley Sceptre, a greyhound.

== National costume and dress ==
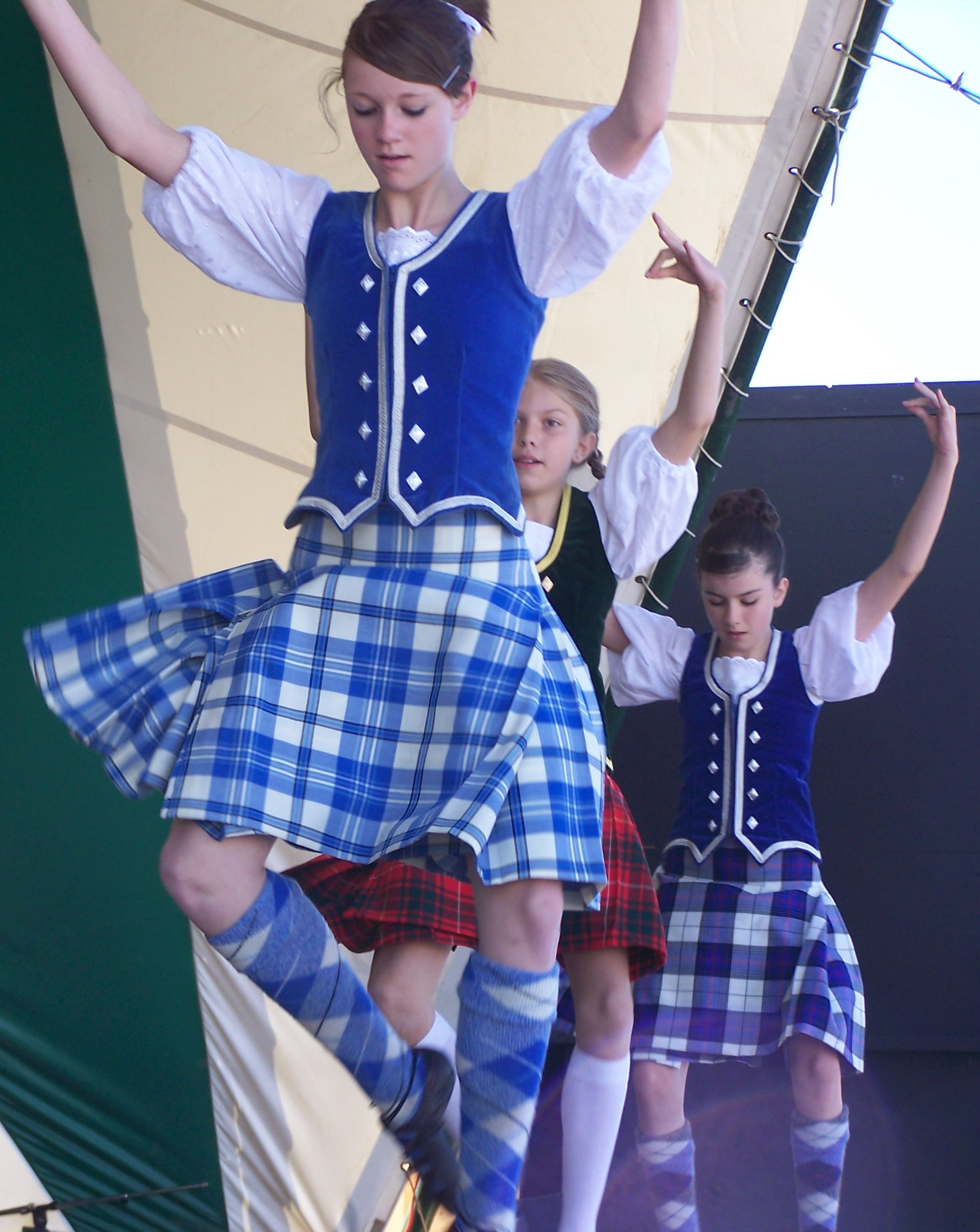
Highland dancing in traditional Gaelic dress with its tartan pattern

As a multi-national state, the UK has no single national costume. However, different countries within the United Kingdom have national costumes or at least are associated with styles of dress. Scotland has the kilt and Tam o'shanter, and tartan clothing – its pattern consisting of criss-crossed horizontal and vertical bands in multiple colours – is a notable aspect of Gaelic culture. A traditional Welsh costume with Welsh hat is worn by some women during Eisteddfodau. In England, the topic of a national costume has been in debate, since no officially recognised clothing is anointed "national". However, the closest to an English national costume can be the smock or smock-frock in the Midlands and Southern England and the maud in Northern England. English country clothing is also popular in rural areas, flat caps and brogue shoes also forming part of the country clothing.

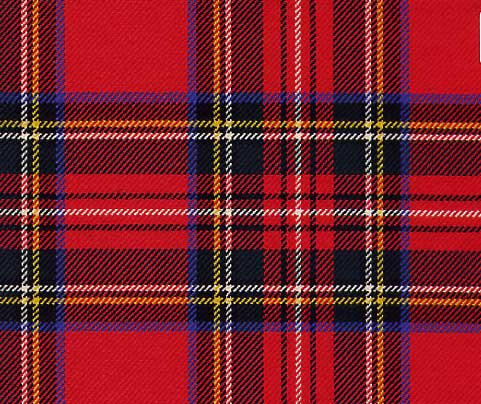
The Royal Stewart tartan. It is also the personal tartan of Queen Elizabeth II Tartan is used in clothing, such as skirts and scarves, and has also appeared on tins of Scottish shortbread.

Certain military uniforms such as the Beefeater or the Queen's Guard are considered to be symbolic of Englishness. Morris dancers or the costumes for the traditional English May dance are sometimes cited as examples of traditional English costume, but are only worn by participants in those events. Designed in 1849 by the London hat-makers Thomas and William Bowler, the Bowler hat is arguably the most iconic stereotyped view of an Englishman (complete with Bowler and rolled umbrella), and was commonly associated with City of London businessmen. Traced back to the north of England in the 14th century, the flat cap is associated with the working classes in the UK. The flat cap has seen a 21st-century resurgence in popularity, possibly influenced by various British public figures wearing them, including David Beckham, Harry Styles and Guy Ritchie, with clothing sellers Marks & Spencer reporting that flat cap sales significantly increased in the 2010s. In 1856 William Henry Perkin discovered the first synthetic dye (Mauveine – a purple colour), which was suitable as a dye of silk and other textiles, helping to revolutionise the world of fashion.

Burberry is most famous for creating the trench coat: they were worn by British soldiers in the trenches in World War I. Among various British youth subcultures, Dr. Martens boots (often referred to as DMs) have been the choice of footwear: in the 1960s skinheads started to wear them, and they later became popular among scooter riders, punks, and some new wave musicians. Male mods adopted a sophisticated look that included tailor-made suits, thin ties, button-down collar shirts, Chelsea boots and Clarks desert boots.

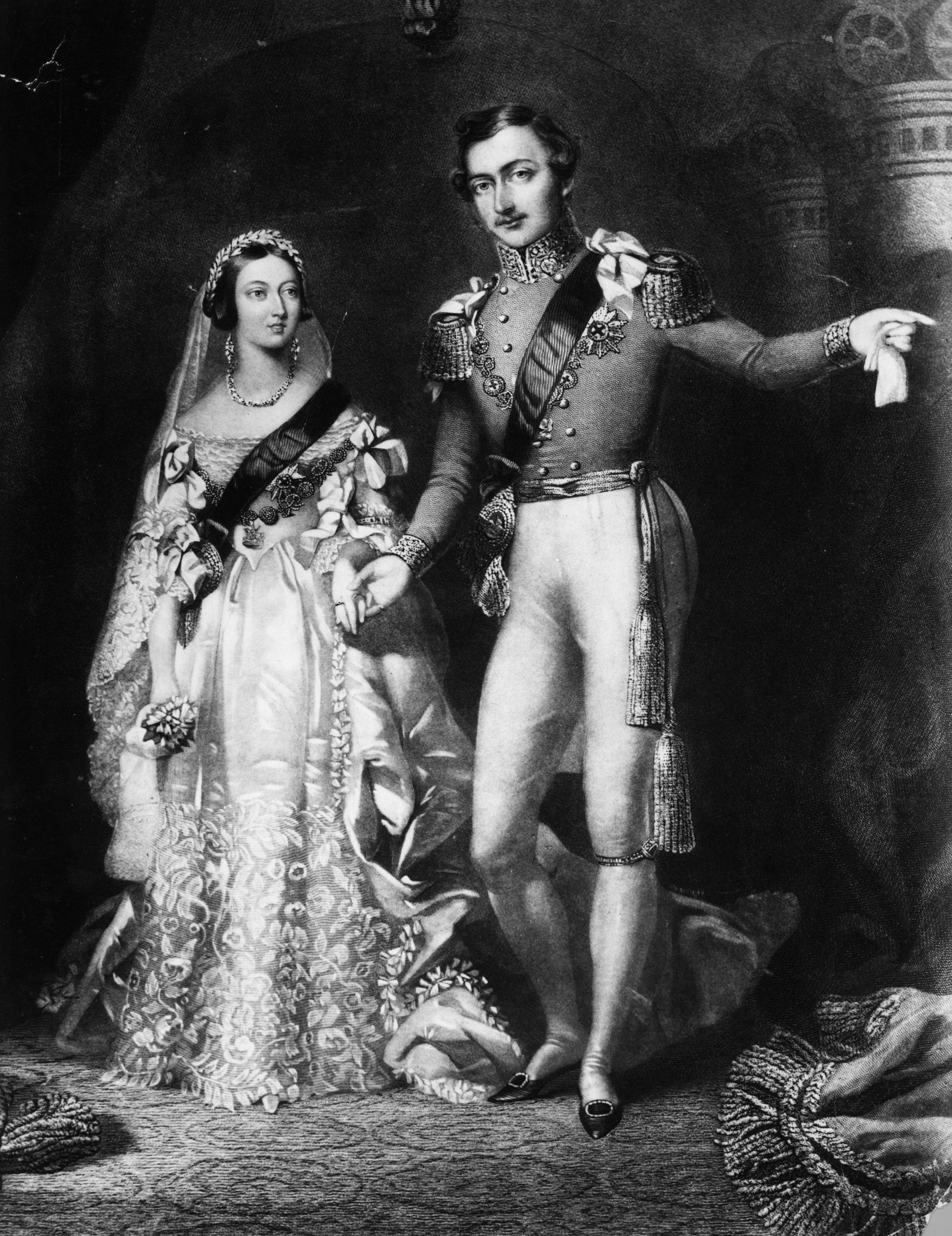
Queen Victoria in her white wedding dress with Prince Albert on their return from the marriage service at St James's Palace, London, 10 February 1840

British sensibilities have played an influential role in world clothing since the 18th century. Particularly during the Victorian era, British fashions defined acceptable dress for men of business. Key figures such as the future Edward VII, Edward VIII, and Beau Brummell, created the modern suit and cemented its dominance. Brummell is credited with introducing and establishing as fashion the modern man's suit, worn with a tie. The use of a coloured and patterned tie (a common feature in British school uniforms) indicating the wearer's membership in a club, regiment, school, professional association etc. stems from the 1880 oarsmen of Exeter College, Oxford, who tied the bands of their straw hats around their necks. The Wellington boot (first worn by Arthur Wellesley, 1st Duke of Wellington) became a staple for outdoor wear.

The tradition of a white wedding is commonly credited to Queen Victoria's choice to wear a white wedding dress at her wedding to Prince Albert in 1840, at a time when white was associated with purity and conspicuous consumption (because it was difficult to keep clean, and thus could not be worn by servants or labourers), and when it was the colour required of girls being presented to the royal court. The 1981 wedding dress of Lady Diana Spencer became one of the most famous dresses in the world, and was considered one of the most closely guarded secrets in fashion history.

== Fashion ==
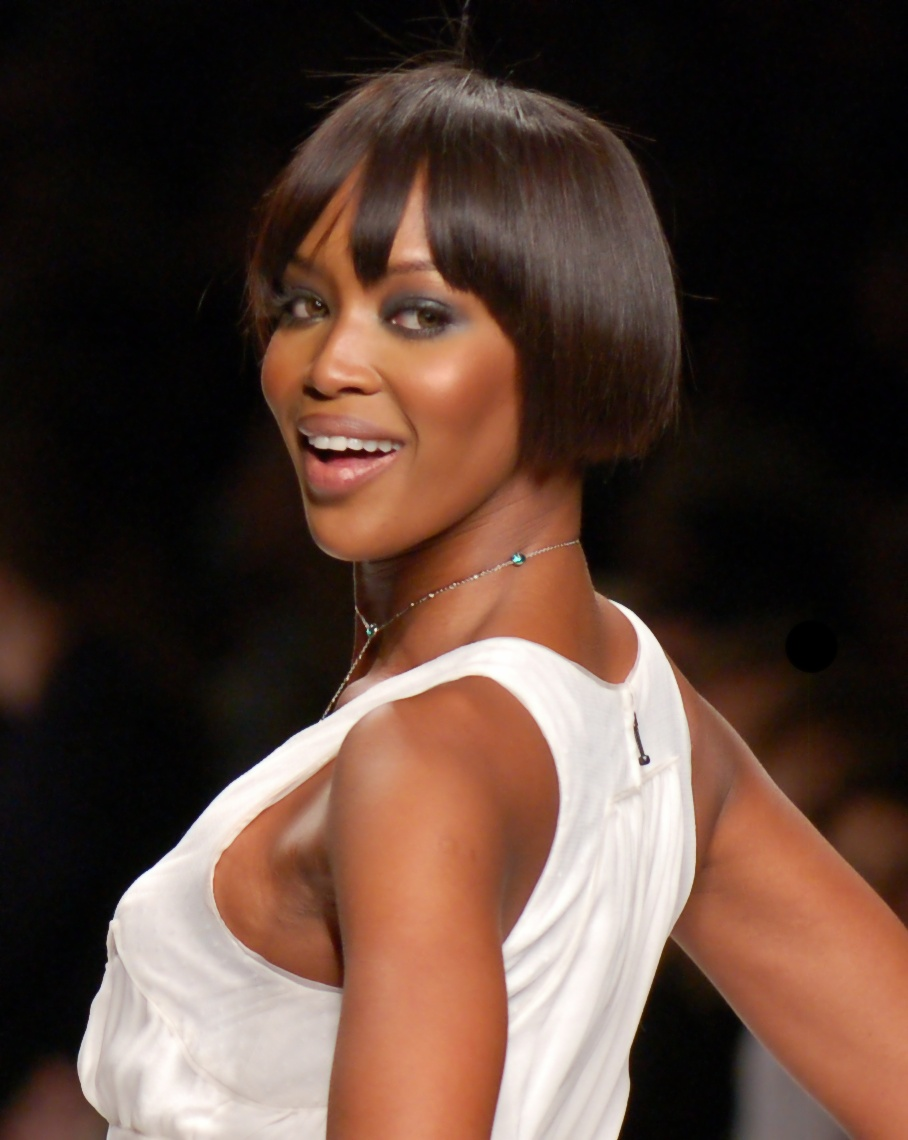
Naomi Campbell appeared on the era-defining January 1990 cover of British Vogue.

British fashion includes traditional tailoring such as bespoke suits associated with Savile Row and the styles of youth subcultures such as mod and punk, which influences fashion in other countries. It reflects the historical social structures, regional materials and craftsmanship, and evolving cultural attitudes found throughout the UK.

London, one of the world's four fashion capitals, hosts London Fashion Week, part of the 'Big Four' fashion weeks. Organised by the British Fashion Council, it takes place twice a year, in February and September. Most "on-schedule" events are held at Somerset House, where catwalk shows and an exhibition feature over 150 designers. Many "off-schedule" events, like On|Off and Vauxhall Fashion Scout, occur at other central London venues.

British designers whose collections have been showcased at the fashion week include Vivienne Westwood, Alexander McQueen, John Galliano and Stella McCartney. British models who have featured at the event include Kate Moss, Naomi Campbell, Jade Jagger, David Gandy, Cara Delevingne and Rosie Huntington-Whiteley. For almost two decades, Princess Diana was a fashion icon whose style was emulated by women around the world.

Fashion designer Mary Quant was at the heart of the "Swinging London" scene of the 1960s, and her work culminated in the creation of the miniskirt and hot pants. Quant named the miniskirt after her favourite make of car, the Mini. The Swinging London fashion scene has featured in films, and was spoofed in the Austin Powers comedy series. The English fashion designer Charles Frederick Worth is widely considered the father of Haute couture.

== Symbols, flags, and emblems ==
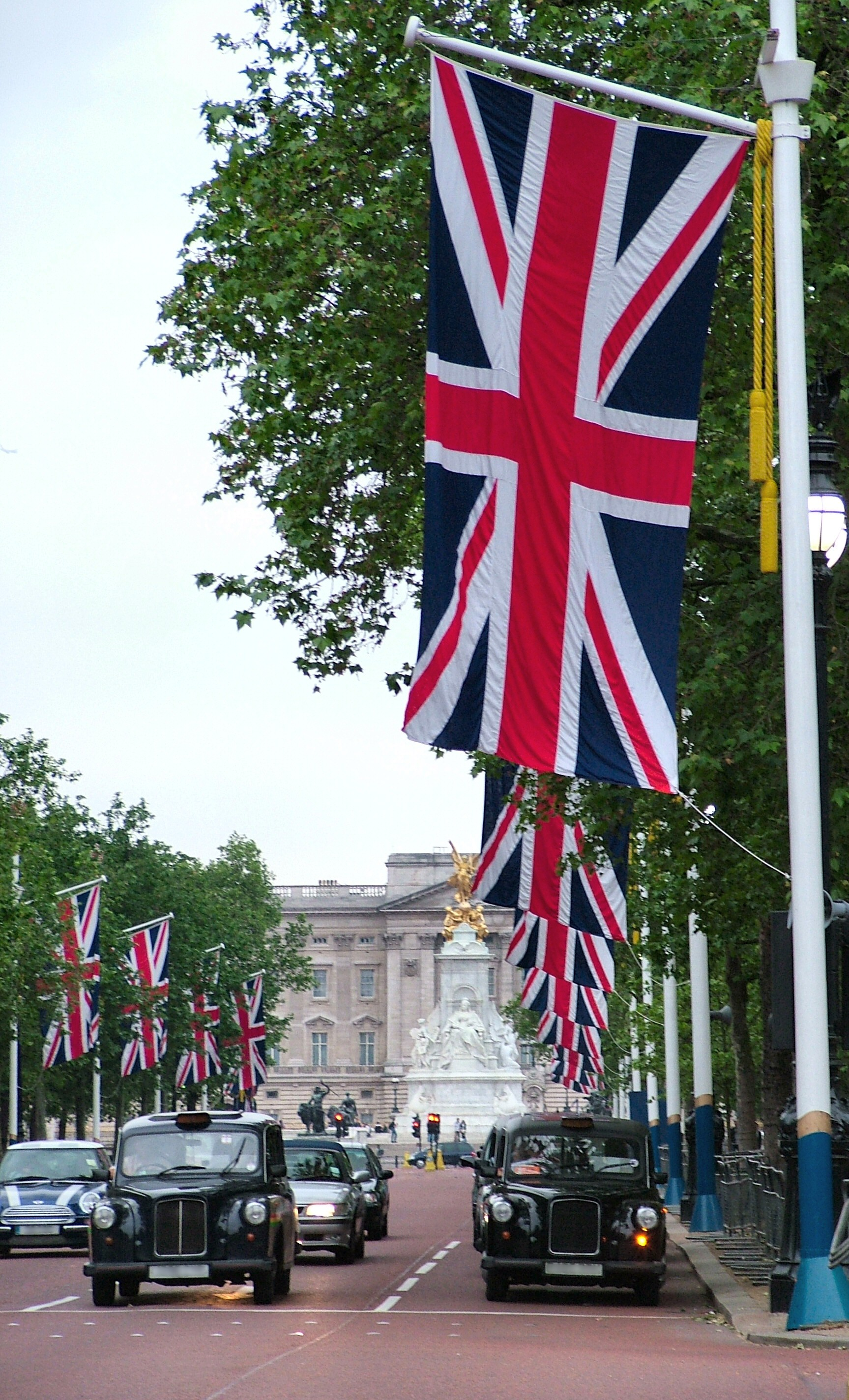
Union Flag being flown on The Mall, London looking towards Buckingham Palace

The United Kingdom as a whole has a number of national symbols, as do its constituent nations. The Union Flag is the national flag of the United Kingdom. The first flag combined the cross of St George with the saltire of Saint Andrew to represent the Union of the Crowns in 1707. St Patrick's saltire was added when the Kingdom of Ireland was unified with Great Britain in 1801, and retained to represent Northern Ireland after partition in 1927. Wales has never been represented on the Union Flag, as in 1707 it was part of the Kingdom of England. Similarly, the Royal coat of arms of the United Kingdom only represents England, Scotland, and Northern Ireland. England occupies the first and fourth quarters of the arms except in Scotland, when its arms take precedence. Britannia is the national personification of the UK, while John Bull is a personification used in satirical contexts, and the national animals are the lion and the bulldog.

The UK does not have a floral emblem, but each nation does. The Tudor rose represents England, a thistle Scotland, the flax flower and shamrock Northern Ireland, and the leek and daffodil Wales. The rose, shamrock and thistle are engrafted on the same stem on the coat of arms of the United Kingdom, and the rose, flax flower, thistle and leek are featured on the badge of the Supreme Court. Another major floral symbol is the remembrance poppy, which has been worn in Britain since 1921 to commemorate soldiers who have died in war. In the weeks leading up to Remembrance Sunday they are distributed by The Royal British Legion in return for donations to their "Poppy Appeal", which supports all current and former British military personnel.

== Traditional communication and greeting cards ==
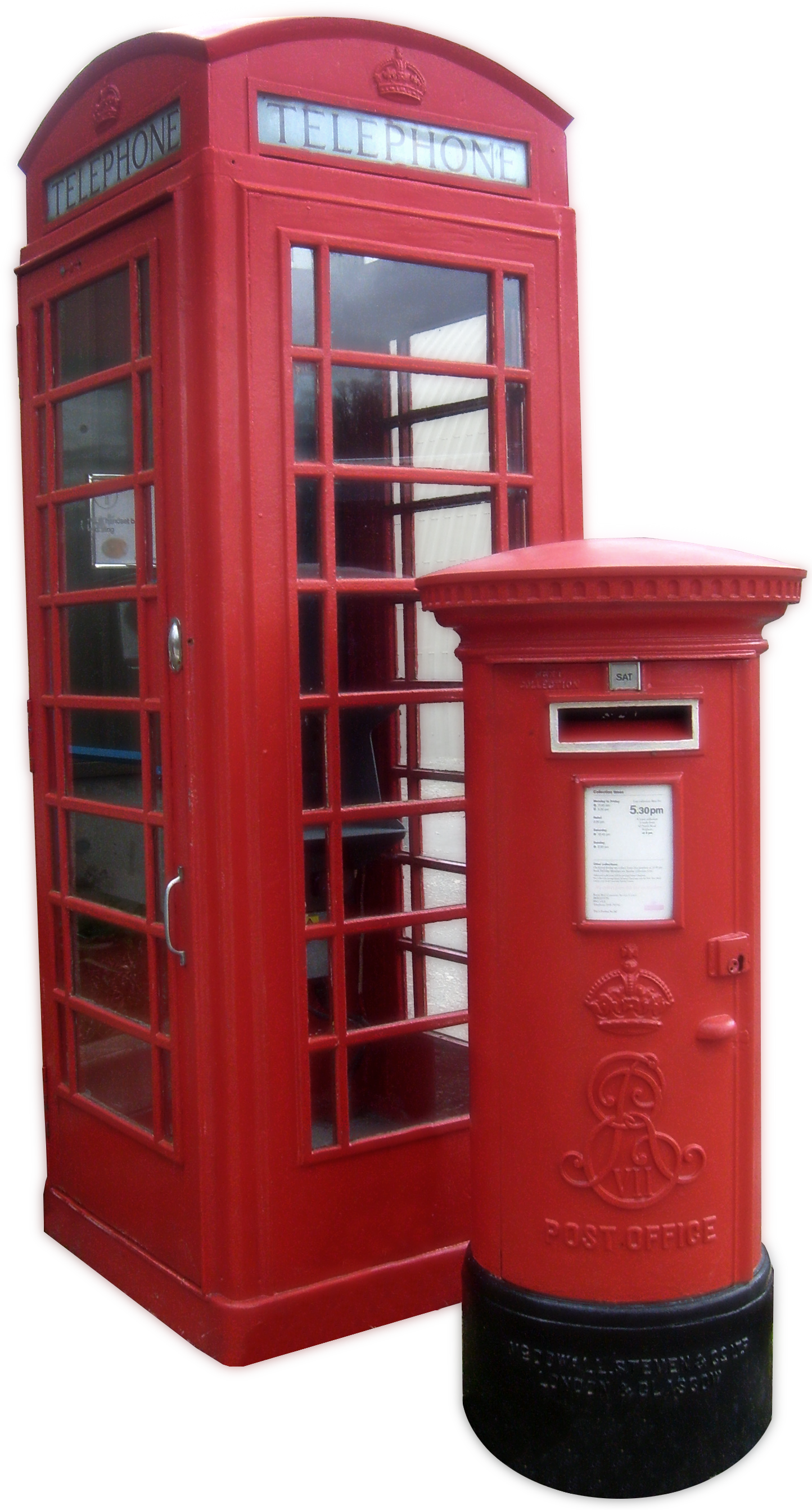
The red telephone box and Royal Mail red post box appear throughout the UK.

A familiar sight throughout the UK, the red telephone box and Royal Mail red post box are considered British cultural icons. Designed by Sir Giles Gilbert in 1924, the red telephone box features a prominent crown representing the British government. The post pillar box was introduced in the 1850s during the reign of Queen Victoria following Sir Rowland Hill's postal reforms in the 1830s where the reduction in postal rates with the invention of the postage stamp (Penny Black) made sending post an affordable means of personal communication. The red telephone box has appeared in British pop culture, such as in Adele's video "Hello", the front cover of One Direction's album Take Me Home, and the back cover of David Bowie's album The Rise and Fall of Ziggy Stardust and the Spiders from Mars.

The world's first postcard was received by Theodore Hook from Fulham, London in 1840. The first pillar boxes had the distinctive Imperial cypher of Victoria Regina. Most pillar boxes produced after 1905 are made of cast iron and are cylindrical, and have served well throughout the reigns of George V, Edward VIII, George VI and Elizabeth II.

The sending and receiving of greeting cards is an established tradition in the UK, with card sending or card display in the home being an important part of British culture.

Sir Henry Cole devised the concept of sending greetings cards at Christmas time. Designed by John Callcott Horsley for Cole in 1843, the Christmas card accounts for almost half of the volume of greeting card sales in the UK, with over 600 million cards sold annually. The robin is a common sight in gardens throughout the UK. It is relatively tame and drawn to human activities, and is frequently voted Britain's national bird in polls. The robin began featuring on many Christmas cards in the mid-19th century. The association with Christmas arises from postmen in Victorian Britain who wore red jackets and were nicknamed "Robins"; the robin featured on the Christmas card is an emblem of the postman delivering the card.

Sending Valentine's Day cards became hugely popular in Britain in the late 18th century, a practice which has since spread to other nations. The day first became associated with romantic love within the circle of Geoffrey Chaucer in the 14th century, when the tradition of courtly love flourished. In Chaucer's Parlement of Foules (1382) he wrote; For this was on seynt Volantynys day. When euery bryd comets there to chese his make. The modern cliché Valentine's Day poem can be found in the 1784 English nursery rhyme Roses Are Red; "The rose is red, the violet's blue. 'The honey's sweet, and so are you. Thou art my love and I am thine. I drew thee to my Valentine."

In 1797, a British publisher issued The Young Man's Valentine Writer which contained scores of suggested sentimental verses for the young lover unable to compose his own. In 1835, 60,000 Valentine cards were sent by post in the UK, despite postage being expensive. A reduction in postal rates (with the 1840 invention of the postage stamp, the Penny Black) increased the practice of mailing Valentines, with 400,000 sent in 1841. In the UK just under half the population spend money on gifts. Other popular occasions for sending greeting cards in the UK are birthdays, Mother's Day, Easter and Father's Day.

== Education ==
Each country of the United Kingdom has a separate education system. Power over education matters in Scotland, Wales and Northern Ireland is devolved but education in England is dealt with by the British government since there is no devolved administration for England.

=== England ===
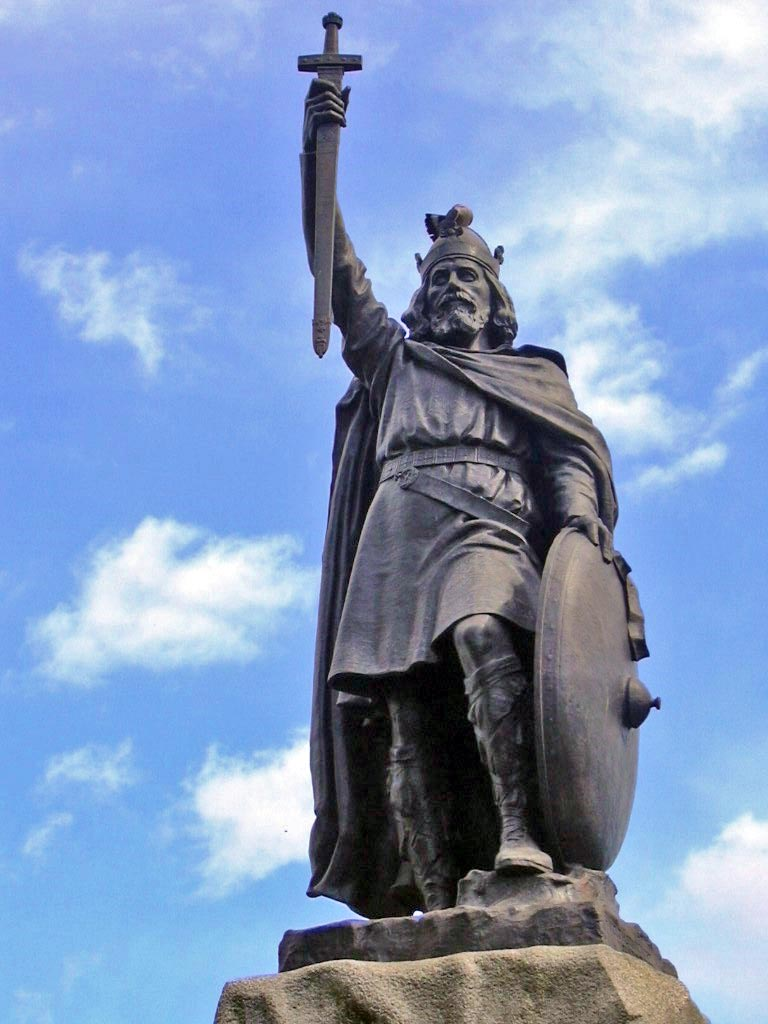
King Alfred the Great statue in Winchester, Hampshire. The 9th-century English king encouraged education in his kingdom, and proposed that primary education be taught in English, with those wishing to advance to holy orders to continue their studies in Latin.

Most schools came under state control in the Victorian era; a formal state school system was instituted after the Second World War. Initially, schools were categorised as infant schools, primary schools and secondary schools (split into more academic grammar schools and more vocational secondary modern schools). Under the Labour governments of the 1960s and 1970s most secondary modern and grammar schools were combined to become comprehensive schools. England has many independent (fee-paying) schools, some founded hundreds of years ago; independent secondary schools are known as public schools. Eton, Harrow, Shrewsbury and Rugby are four of the best-known. The nature and peculiarities of these Public schools have frequently featured in British literature. Prior to 1999, corporal punishment was allowed in such schools, whilst the use of corporal punishment was outlawed in state schools in 1987. Most primary and secondary schools in both the private and state sectors have compulsory school uniforms. Allowances are almost invariably made, however, to accommodate religious dress, including the Islamic hijab and Sikh bangle (kara).

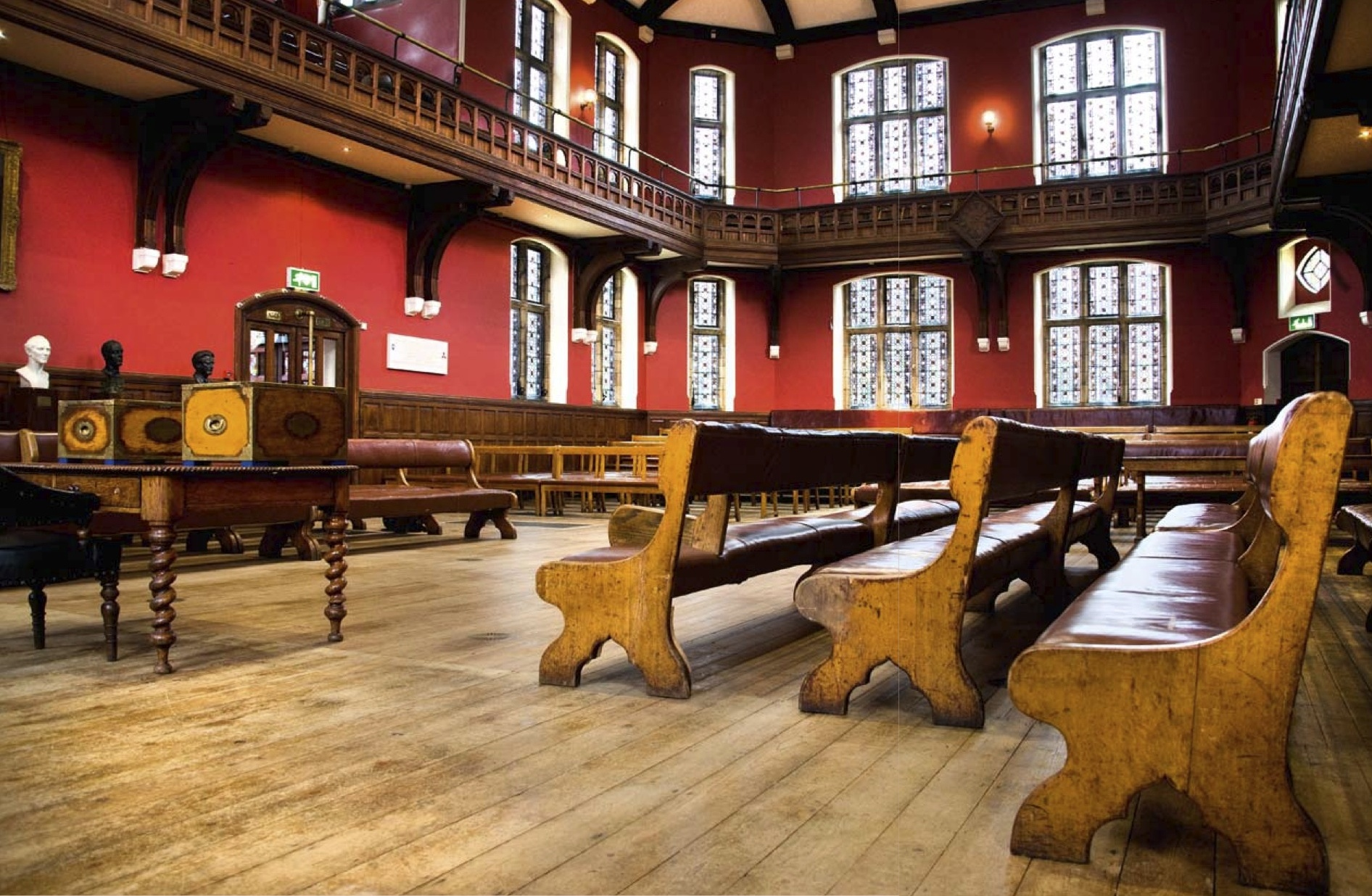
The Oxford Union debate chamber. Called the "world's most prestigious debating society", the Oxford Union has hosted leaders and celebrities.

Although the Minister of Education is responsible to Parliament for education, the day-to-day administration and funding of state schools is the responsibility of local education authorities.

England's universities include some of the highest-ranked universities in the world: the University of Cambridge, Imperial College London, the University of Oxford and University College London are all ranked in the global top 10 in the 2010 QS World University Rankings. The London School of Economics has been described as the world's leading social science institution for both teaching and research. The London Business School is considered one of the world's leading business schools and in 2010 its MBA programme was ranked best in the world by the Financial Times. Academic degrees in England are usually split into classes: first class (I), upper second class (II:1), lower second class (II:2) and third (III), and unclassified (below third class).

=== Northern Ireland ===
The Northern Ireland Assembly is responsible for education in Northern Ireland. Schools are administered by five Education and Library Boards covering different geographical areas.

=== Scotland ===
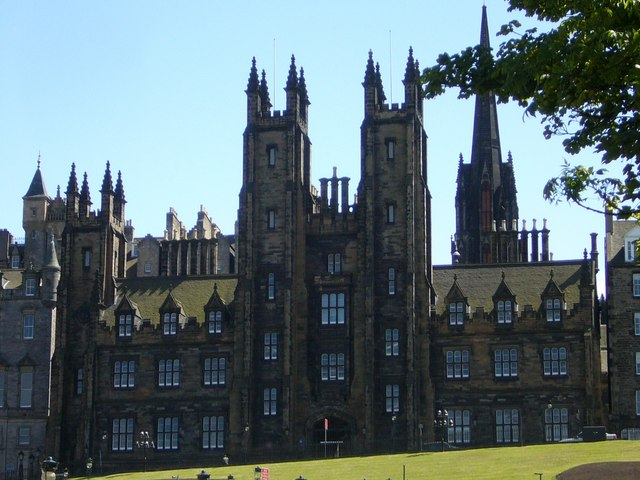
New College, University of Edinburgh

Scotland has a long history of universal provision of public education which, traditionally, has emphasised breadth across a range of subjects rather than depth of education in a smaller range of subjects. The majority of schools are non-denominational, but by law separate Roman Catholic schools, with an element of control by the Roman Catholic Church, are provided by the state system. Qualifications at the secondary school and post-secondary (further education) levels are provided by the Scottish Qualifications Authority and delivered through various schools, colleges and other centres. Political responsibility for education at all levels is vested in the Scottish Parliament and the Scottish Executive Education and Enterprise, Transport & Lifelong Learning Departments. State schools are owned and operated by the local authorities which act as Education Authorities, and the compulsory phase is divided into primary school and secondary school (often called high school, with the world's oldest high school being the Royal High School, Edinburgh in 1505, which colonists spread to the New World owing to the high prestige enjoyed by the Scottish educational system). Schools are supported in delivering the National Guidelines and National Priorities by Learning and Teaching Scotland.

First degree courses at Scottish universities are often a year longer than elsewhere in the UK, though sometimes students can take a more advanced entrance exam and join the courses in the second year. One unique aspect is that the ancient universities of Scotland award a Master of Arts degree as the first degree in humanities. The University of Edinburgh is among the top twenty universities in the world according to the QS World University Rankings 2011. It is also among the Ancient Universities of Great Britain.

=== Wales ===
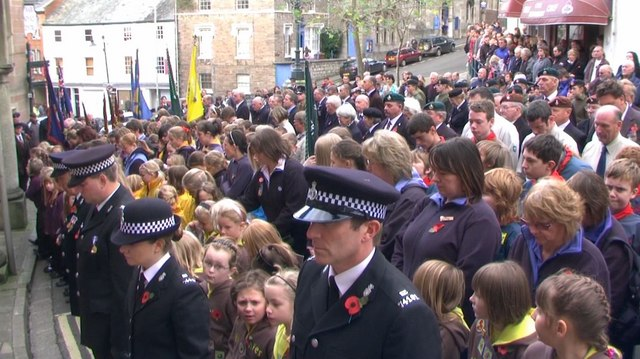
Scouts, Brownies, and Cubs with the local community in Tiverton, Devon on Remembrance Sunday

The National Assembly for Wales has responsibility for education in Wales. A significant number of students in Wales are educated either wholly or largely through the medium of the Welsh language, and lessons in the language are compulsory for all until the age of 16. There are plans to increase the provision of Welsh medium education as part of the policy of promoting a fully bilingual Wales.

=== Outdoor education ===
Scouting is the largest co-educational youth movement in the UK. Scouting began in 1907 when Robert Baden-Powell, Lieutenant General in the British Army, held the first Scout camp at Brownsea Island in Dorset, England. Baden-Powell wrote the principles of Scouting in Scouting for Boys in 1908. In July 2009, adventurer Bear Grylls became the youngest Chief Scout ever, aged 35. In 2010, scouting in the UK experienced its biggest growth since 1972, taking total membership to almost 500,000.

== Sociological issues ==
=== Housing ===
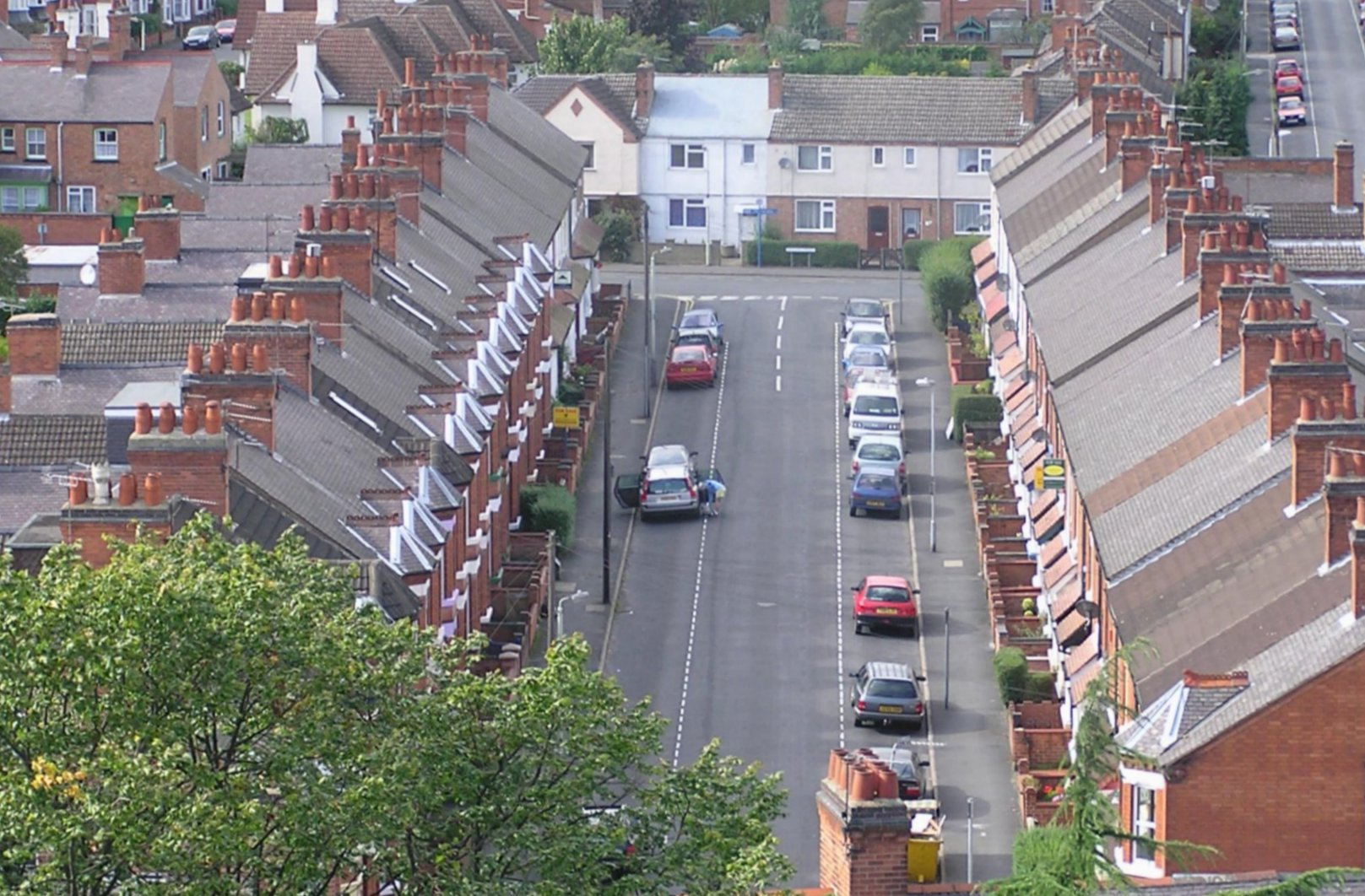
Terraced houses are typical in inner cities and places of high population density.

The UK (England in particular) has a relatively high population density so housing tends to be more closely packed than in other countries. Thus terraced houses are widespread, dating back to the aftermath of the Great Fire of London.

As the first industrialised country in the world, the UK has long been urbanised. In the 20th century, suburbanisation led to a spread of semi-detached and detached housing. After the Second World War, public housing was dramatically expanded to create a large number of council estates. There are many historic country houses and stately homes in rural areas, though only a minority of these are still used as private living accommodation.

In recent times, more detached housing has started to be built. Also, city living has boomed, with city centre populations rising rapidly. Most of this population growth has been accommodated in new apartment blocks in residential schemes in many towns and cities. Demographic changes (see below) are putting great pressure on the housing market, especially in London and the South East.

=== Living arrangements ===
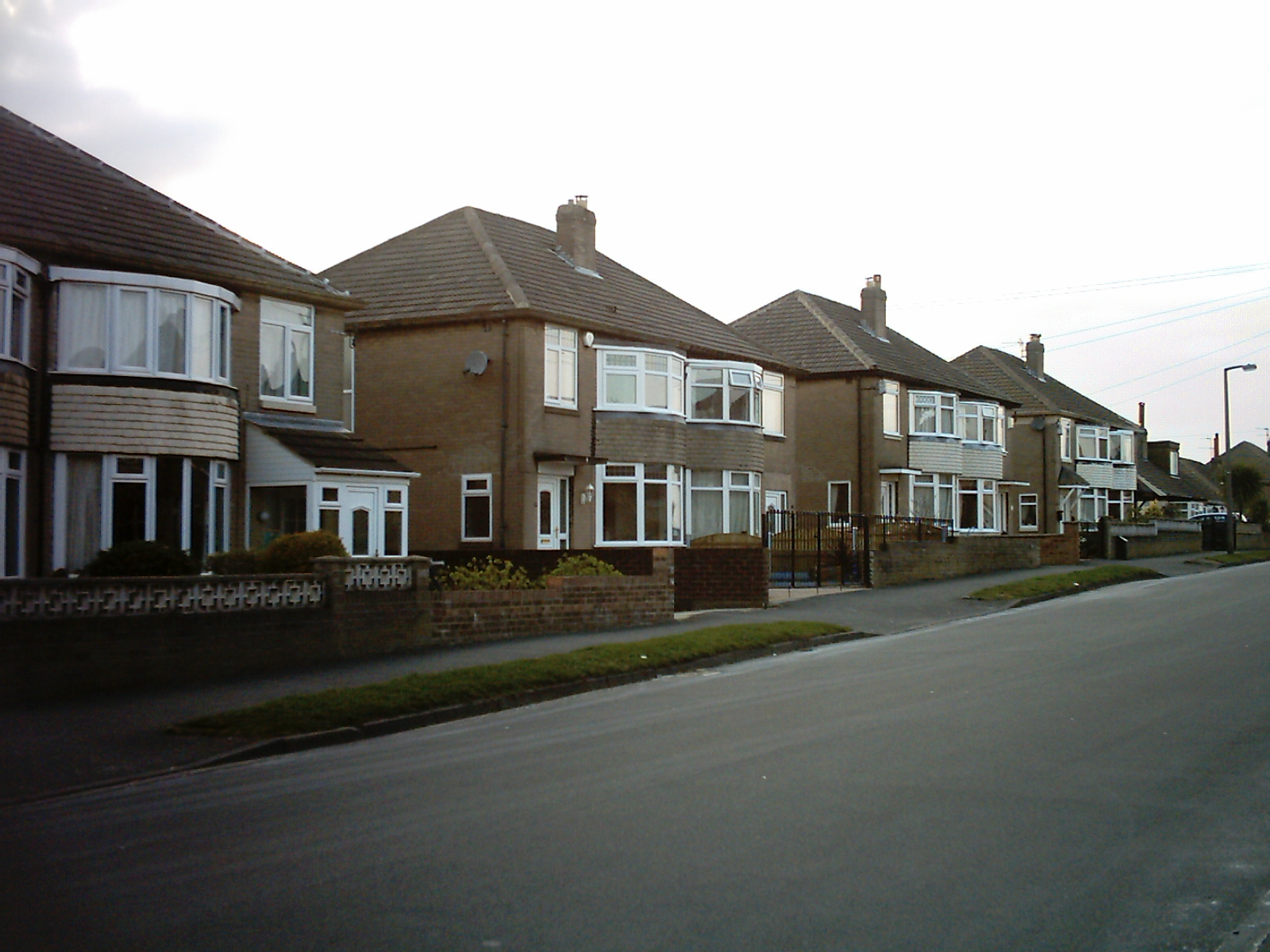
Typical 20th-century, three-bedroom semi-detached houses in England

Historically most people in the United Kingdom lived either in conjugal extended families or nuclear families. This reflected an economic landscape where the general populace tended to have less spending power, meaning that it was more practical to stick together rather than go their individual ways. This pattern also reflected gender roles. Men were expected to go out to work and women were expected to stay at home and look after the families.

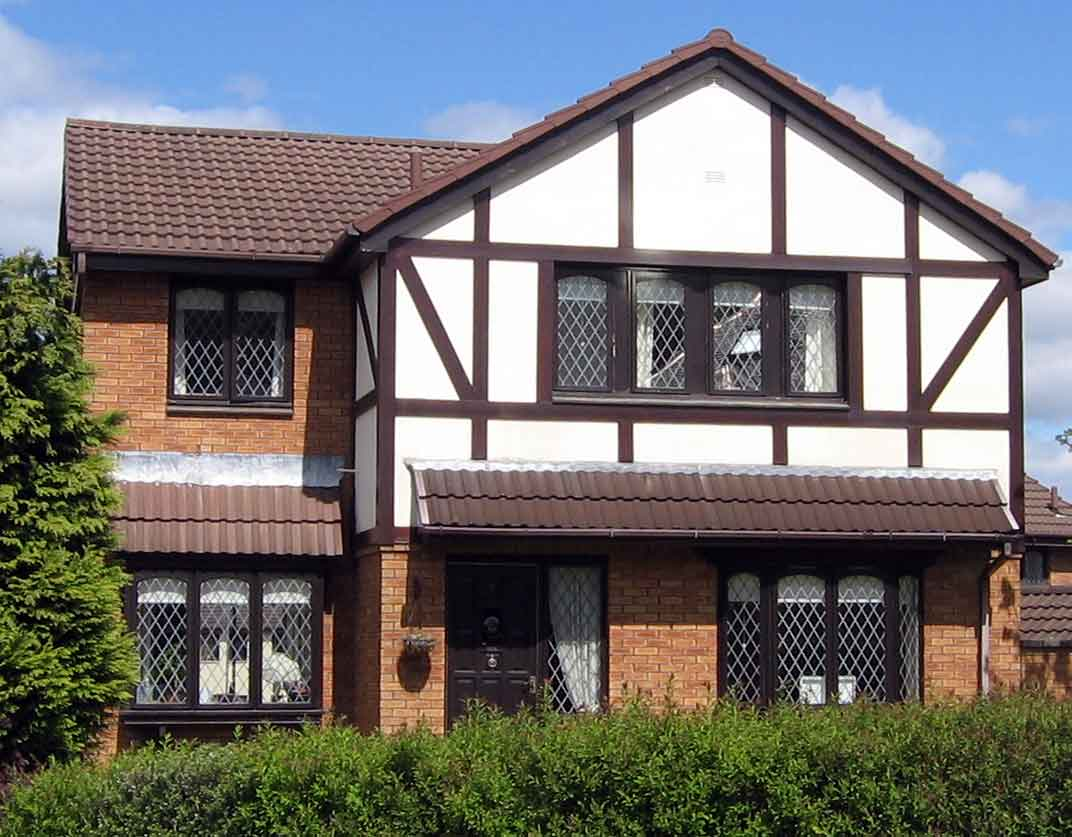
A 21st-century detached Mock Tudor house in Scotland. Its timber framing is typical of English Tudor architecture.

In the 20th century the emancipation of women, the greater freedoms enjoyed by both men and women in the years following the Second World War, greater affluence and easier divorce have changed gender roles and living arrangements significantly. The general trend is a rise in single people living alone, the virtual extinction of the extended family (outside certain ethnic minority communities), and the nuclear family arguably reducing in prominence.

From the 1990s, the break-up of the traditional family unit, when combined with low interest rates and other demographic changes, has created great pressure on the housing market, in particular on accommodation for "key workers" such as nurses, other emergency service workers and teachers, who are priced out of most housing, especially in the South East. Some research indicates that in the 21st century young people are tending to continue to live in the parental home for much longer than their predecessors.

=== Happiness ===
When Brits were asked to rate their happiness yesterday on a scale of 1 to 10 in 2018, respondent's mean answer was 7.54 (ranked 'High') in 2018. Northern Irish respondents were ranked the happiest of the United Kingdom (with a mean of 7.74), followed by the English (with 7.54), then the Scots (with 7.52) and finally the Welsh (with 7.51).

However, only 25% of women and girls between the ages of 7 and 21 claim to be very happy, which has fallen from 41% in 2009. They claimed that it was due to the pressure from exams and social media, which exerted undue amounts of stress on them. In that category, the oldest were the least happy: 27% of young women aged 17 to 21 claimed they were not happy, compared to 11% in 2009. This negatively influenced their confidence by 61%, health by 50%, relationships by 49% and studying by 39%. 69% of respondents in that age group claimed school exams were the chief stressor, 59% felt pressure from social media was making them less happy, and compared to 5 years ago, more claimed they had experienced unkind, threatening or negative reactions on social media. The proportion of the population who knew someone with mental health issues rose from 62% in 2015 to 71% in 2018. Many young women and girls feel unsafe walking alone: over half aged from 13 to 21 have experienced harassment or know someone who has, and almost half feel unsafe using public transport.

== Naming conventions ==
The common naming convention throughout the United Kingdom is for everyone to have one or more given names (a forename, still often referred to as a "Christian name") usually (but not always) indicating the child's sex, and a surname ("family name"). A four-year study by the University of the West of England, which concluded in 2016, analysed sources dating from the 11th to the 19th centuries to explain the origins of the surnames in the British Isles. The study found that over 90% of the 45,602 surnames in the dictionary are native to the British Isles; the most common in the UK are Smith, Jones, Williams, Brown, Taylor, Johnson, and Lee. Since the 19th century middle names (additional forenames) have become very common and are sometimes taken from the name of a family member.

Most surnames of British origin fall into seven categories:

- Occupations e.g. Smith, Sawyer, Fuller, Brewer, Clark, Cooper, Cook, Carpenter, Bailey, Parker, Forrester, Head, Palmer, Archer, Hunt, Baker, Miller, Dyer, Walker, Woodman, Taylor, Turner, Knight, Slater, Mason, Weaver, Carter, Wright
- Personal characteristics e.g. Short, Brown, Black, Whitehead, Young, Stout, Long, White
- Geographical features e.g. Pond, Bridge, Camp, Hill, Bush, Lake, Lee, Wood, Holmes, Forest, Underwood, Hall, Brooks, Fields, Stone, Morley, Moore, Perry
- Place names e.g. Murray, Everingham, Burton, Leighton, Hamilton, Sutton, Flint, Laughton
- Estate For those descended from landowners, the name of their holdings, manor or estate
- Patronymics, matronymics or ancestral, often from a person's given name. e.g. from male name: Richardson, Jones (Welsh for John), Williams, Thomas, Jackson, Wilson, Thompson, Johnson, Harris, Evans, Simpson, Willis, Davies, Reynolds, Adams, Dawson, Lewis, Rogers, Murphy, Nicholson, Robinson, Powell, Ferguson, Davis, Edwards, Hudson, Roberts, Harrison, Watson, or female names Molson (from Moll for Mary), Gilson (from Gill), Emmott (from Emma), Marriott (from Mary) or from a clan name (for those of Scottish origin, e.g. MacDonald, Forbes, Henderson, Armstrong, Grant, Cameron, Stewart, Douglas, Crawford, Campbell, Houston, Hunter) with "Mac" Irish and Scottish Gaelic for son.
- Patronal from patronage (Hickman meaning Hick's man, where Hick is a pet form of the name Richard) or strong ties of religion Kilpatrick (follower of Patrick) or Kilbride (follower of Bridget).

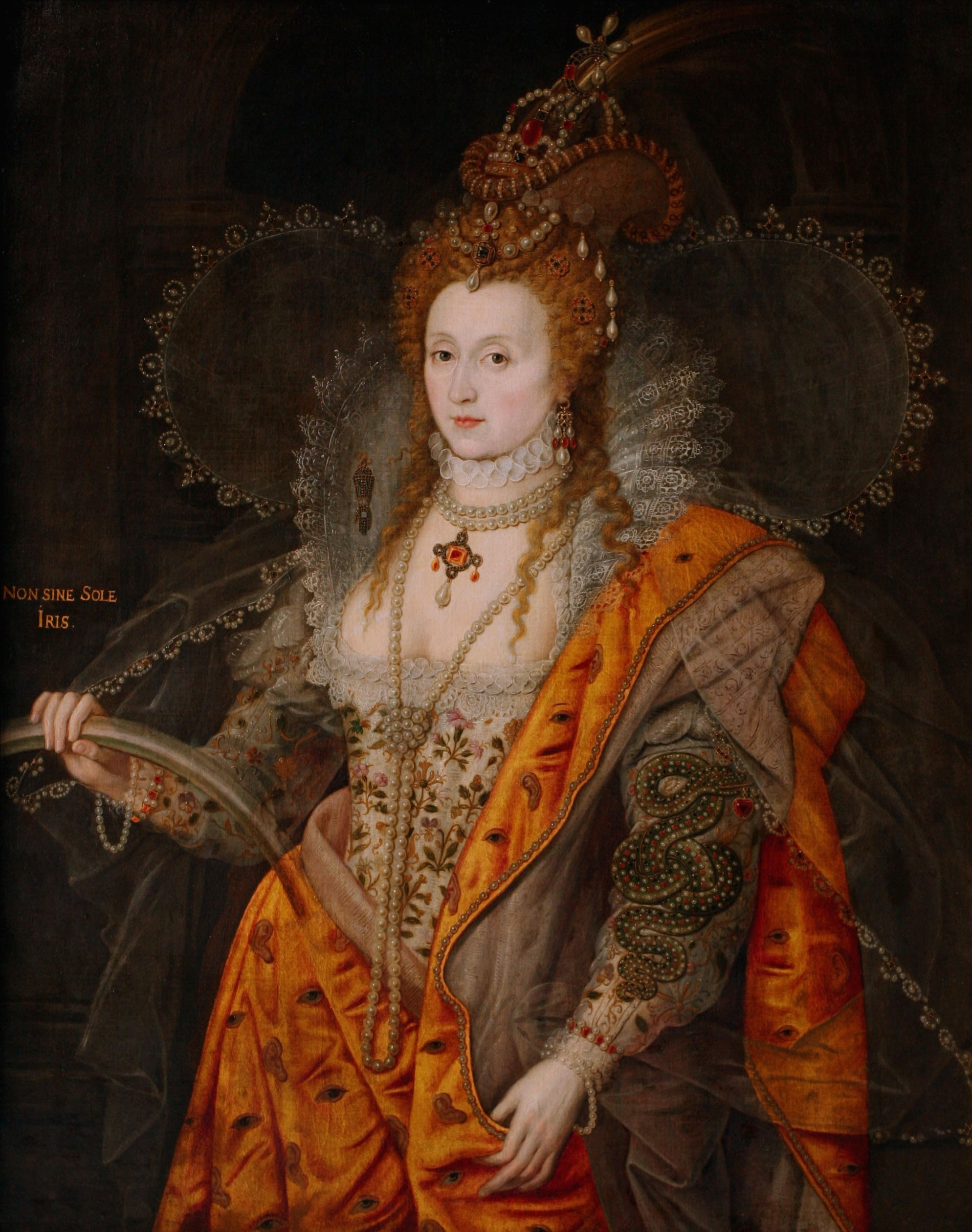
Virginia: usage as a girl's name was inspired by Elizabeth I, the "Virgin Queen".

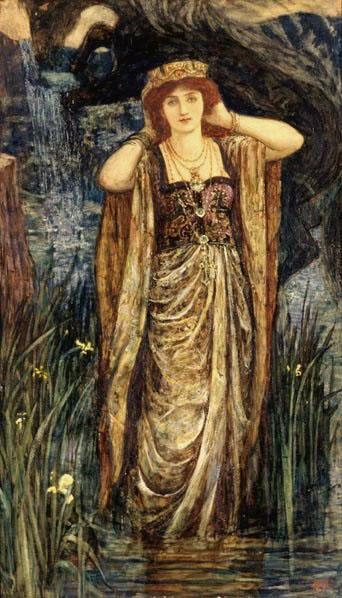
Jennifer is a Cornish form of Guinevere (Gwenhwyfar) pictured.

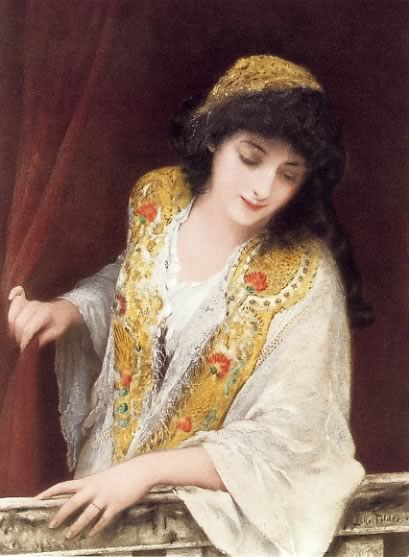
The name Jessica first appears in Shakespeare's 1590s play The Merchant of Venice.

Traditionally, Christian names were those of Biblical figures or recognised saints; however, in the Gothic Revival of the Victorian era, other Anglo Saxon and mythical names enjoyed something of a fashion among the literati. Since the 20th century, however, first names have been influenced by a much wider cultural base.

First names from the British Isles include Jennifer, a Cornish form of Guinevere (Welsh: Gwenhwyfar) from Arthurian romance, which gained recognition after George Bernard Shaw used it for the main female character in his play The Doctor's Dilemma (1906): Jennifer first entered the top 100 most commonly used names for baby girls in England and Wales in 1934. The oldest written record of the name Jessica is in Shakespeare's play The Merchant of Venice, where it belongs to the daughter of Shylock. Jessica is the seventh most popular name for baby girls in England and Wales in 2015. First appearing in 13th century England, Olivia was popularised by Shakespeare's character in the Twelfth Night (1602). Vanessa was created by Jonathan Swift in his poem Cadenus and Vanessa (1713). While it first appeared in late 16th century England, Pamela was popularised after Samuel Richardson named it as the title for his 1740 novel.

See also:

- Most popular names of England and Wales
- Most popular names of Northern Ireland
- Most popular names of Scotland
- Most common surnames in England
- Most common surnames in Northern Ireland
- Most common surnames in Scotland
- Most common surnames in Wales

== See also ==
- British humour
- Department for Culture, Media and Sport (deals with Culture for England)
- Minister for Culture and External Affairs (deals with Culture for Scotland)
- Shrove Tuesday (Pancake Day)
- April Fools' Day
- Lord Kitchener Wants You
- List of libraries in the United Kingdom
- List of venues in the United Kingdom
- Social history of Postwar Britain (1945–1979)
- Social history of the United Kingdom (1979–present)
- Commonwealth of Nations – Culture
