= Dan Castello =

American circus operator (1836–1909)

- Born: Daniel Castello; 1836
- Died: 1909 (aged 72–73); United States
- Occupation: Circus owner

Dan Castello (1836 – April 23, 1909) was an American showman, animal trainer, clown, and circus director who made the first transcontinental railroad tour in American circus history.

== Early life ==
Daniel Castello was born in 1836. He was a resident of Racine, Wisconsin.

== Circus life ==
Castello began his career in the late 1840s as a tumbler and equestrian. Originally a champion bareback rider, he later transitioned to work as a manager and clown. He managed a small floating circus that entertained audiences at the ports along the Great Lakes.

=== Travelling Circus ===
In the midst of the American Civil War, Dan Castello ventured into circus proprietorship in 1863. He partnered with Matt Van Vleck to establish a wagon show in Fair Play, Wisconsin, debuting Castello & Van Vleck's Mammoth Circus in Dubuque, Iowa. Castello became a singing and horseriding clown, later known as the great American Clown and Leaper. After the tour, Castello left to break horses for a summer tour.

At the end of 1865, he took on James M. Nixon as a partner and the two continued together for the next few years.

Dan Castello's Great Circus & Egyptian Caravan was founded in Delavan, Wisconsin, in 1867 by Dan Castello and William C. Coup. It featured camels that belonged to the United States Camel Corps. In September of the year, Dan Castello's Circus and Van Amburgh's Menagerie combined for a show in Savannah.

In 1868, The Great New York Circus combined with Dan Castello's great show for an appearance in Cleveland. By 1869, the Wisconsin circus clown, in partnership with James M. Nixon arrived by train in Omaha, Nebraska. During their run in the Midwestern United States, manager James M. Nixon had the idea to bring Dan Castello's Circus and Menagerie to the Pacific coast.

=== Transcontinental Tour ===
In 1869, the Transcontinental Railroad was completed, allowing traveling entertainers to tour the United States from coast to coast. Dan Castello's Great Circus was among the first to take advantage, moving from Nebraska to California. The circus launched its journey from Nebraska, moving through Colorado to San Francisco for a series of Western shows. They reached San Francisco on July 26, 1869. Performing at the California State Fair in September 1869, Dan Castello's Circus and Menagerie holds the distinction of being the nation's first transcontinental circus transported fully by rail. Following its departure from Sacramento, the circus visited various points throughout California until October. Facing financial strain, Castello sold his circus in California and eventually joined forces with P.T. Barnum.

=== P.T. Barnum's Great Traveling Museum, Menagerie, Caravan, & Hippodrome ===
Following the second fire that razed Barnum's American Museum, Barnum, the museum's proprietor, decided to retire. Dan Castello came up with the idea of leveraging Barnum's money, fame, and talent to establish a massive circus. In 1870, a proposal was made to the American showman P. T. Barnum to join Dan Castello, owner of the Dan Castello Show, along with side-show manager and part-owner W.C. Coup as a partner in the circus enterprise. On April 10, 1871, Castello, W.C. Coup, and P. T. Barnum opened their joint venture, a travelling menagerie and equestrian stunt show which utilized the famous Barnum name. From the circus conceived and organized in Delavan by W.C. Coup and Dan Castello, it became P.T. Barnum's Great Traveling Museum, Menagerie, Caravan, & Hippodrome. On March 20, 1871, the first circus was loaded on rail cars and transported to Brooklyn, New York, where it would perform its first show on April 10, 1871. Castello managed the circus department of P.T. Barnum's Great Traveling Museum, Menagerie, Caravan, & Hippodrome through his smaller travelling show titled Dan Castello's Mammoth Circus which was performed in a separate tent. The advertisements portrayed him as a 'gentleman of rare accomplishments as a jester and conversationalist, whose varied and ripe experience in Continental Europe, and North and South America, render his services of great value'. By 1872, they had a revolving Temple of Juno pulled by 20 camels.

In March 1873, P.T. Barnum's Great Travelling World's Fair included P.T. Barnum as the proprietor, W.C. Coup as the general manager, and Dan Castello as the manager of the Grand Oriental Circus.

Castello sold his interests after being bought out in 1874 and had parted ways with P.T. Barnum who joined James Bailey to create Barnum and Bailey's Circus. In 1876, Dan Castello's Centennial Circus was established in Delavan, co-owned by W.C. Coup and Dan Castello.

== Death ==
Dan Castello died in 1909.
