= Circus train =

Method of travel for circus troupes

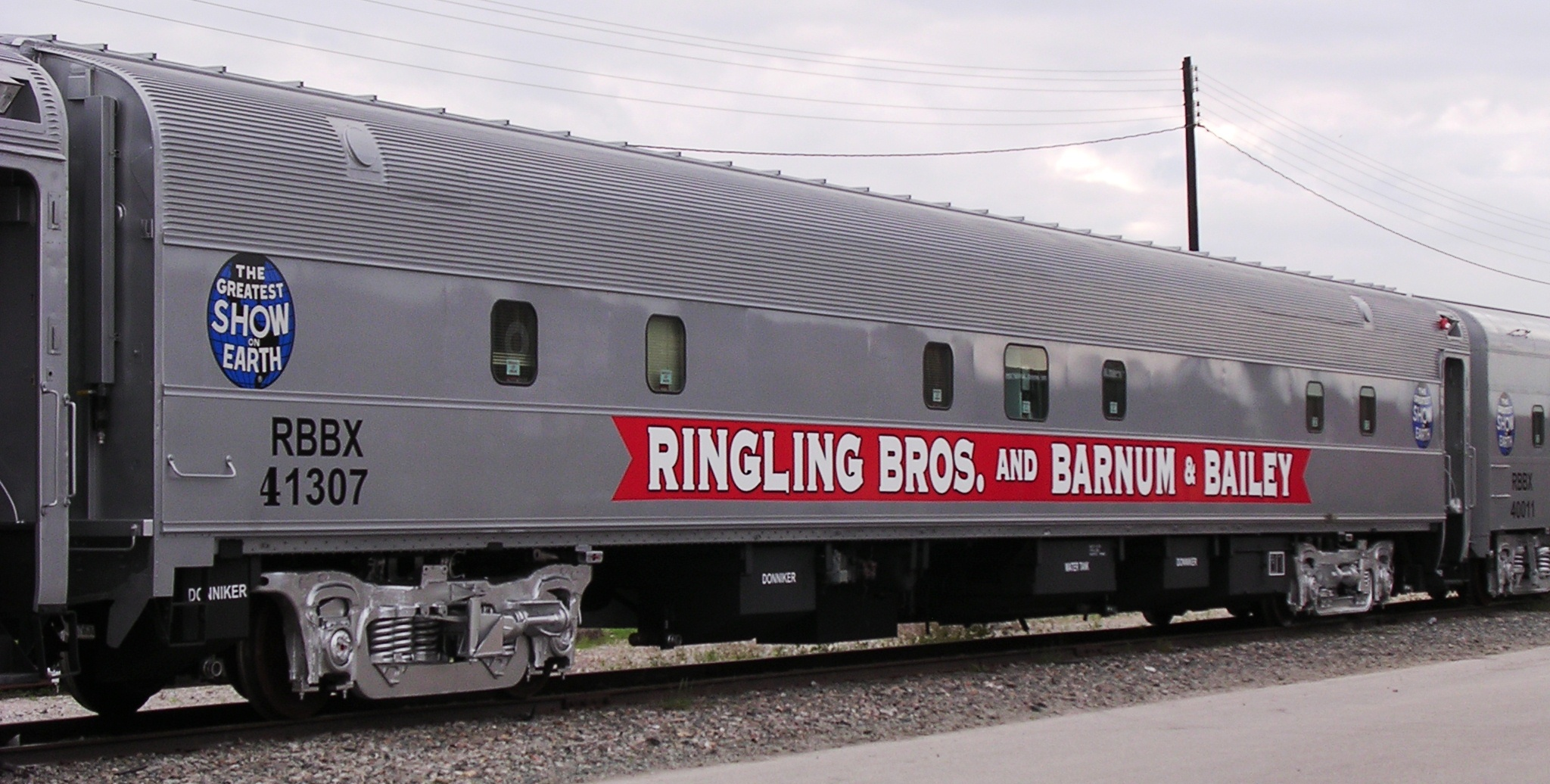
RBBX 41307 after refurbishment – Tampa, Florida. This coach was former Pennsylvania Railroad car #8267, and in the 1960s, carried the name "Lewistown Inn."

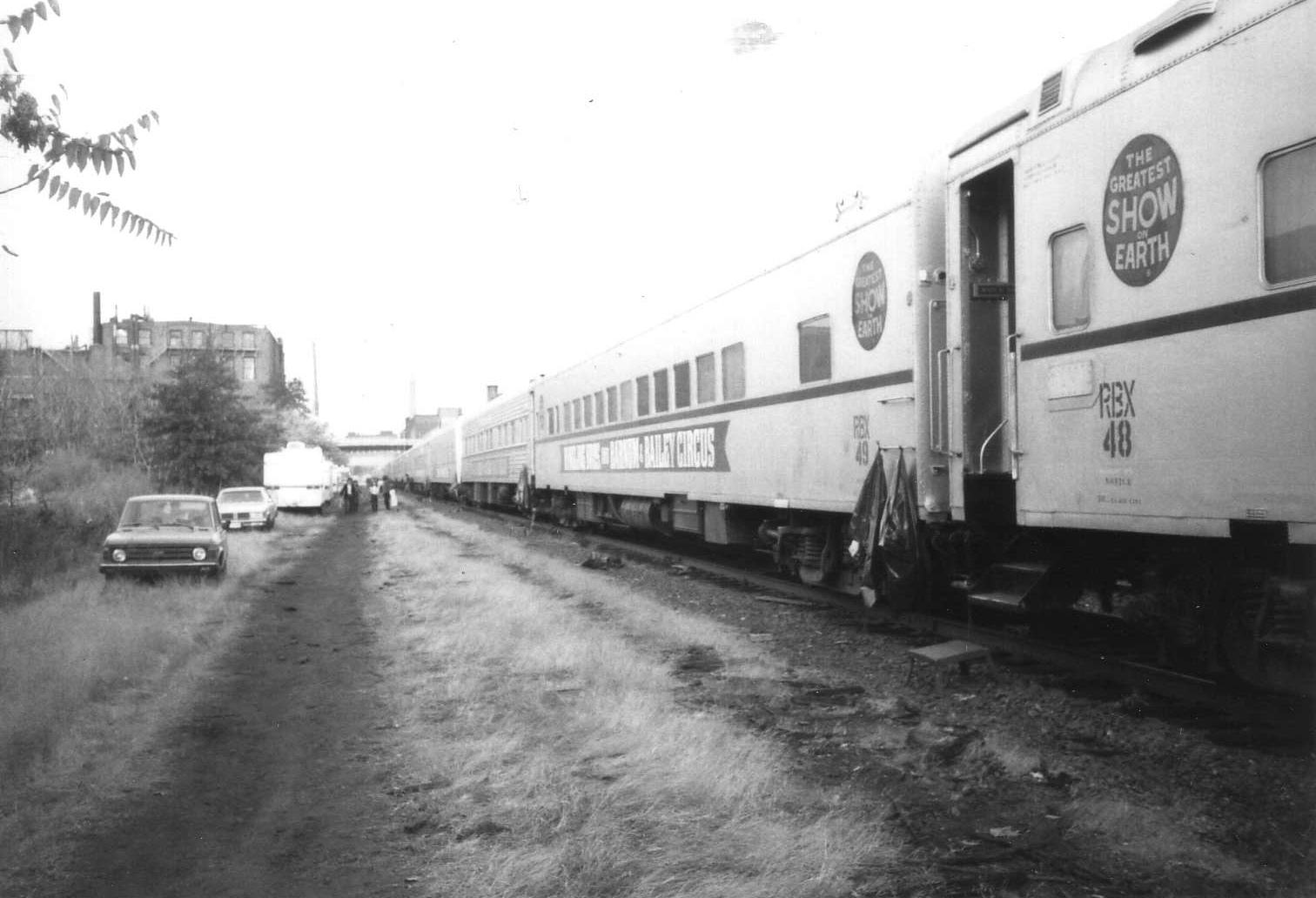
Circus train of the Ringling Bros. and Barnum & Bailey Circus, parked on the Grand Junction Railroad in back of MIT in Cambridge, Massachusetts during a series of performances at the Boston Garden in 1984.

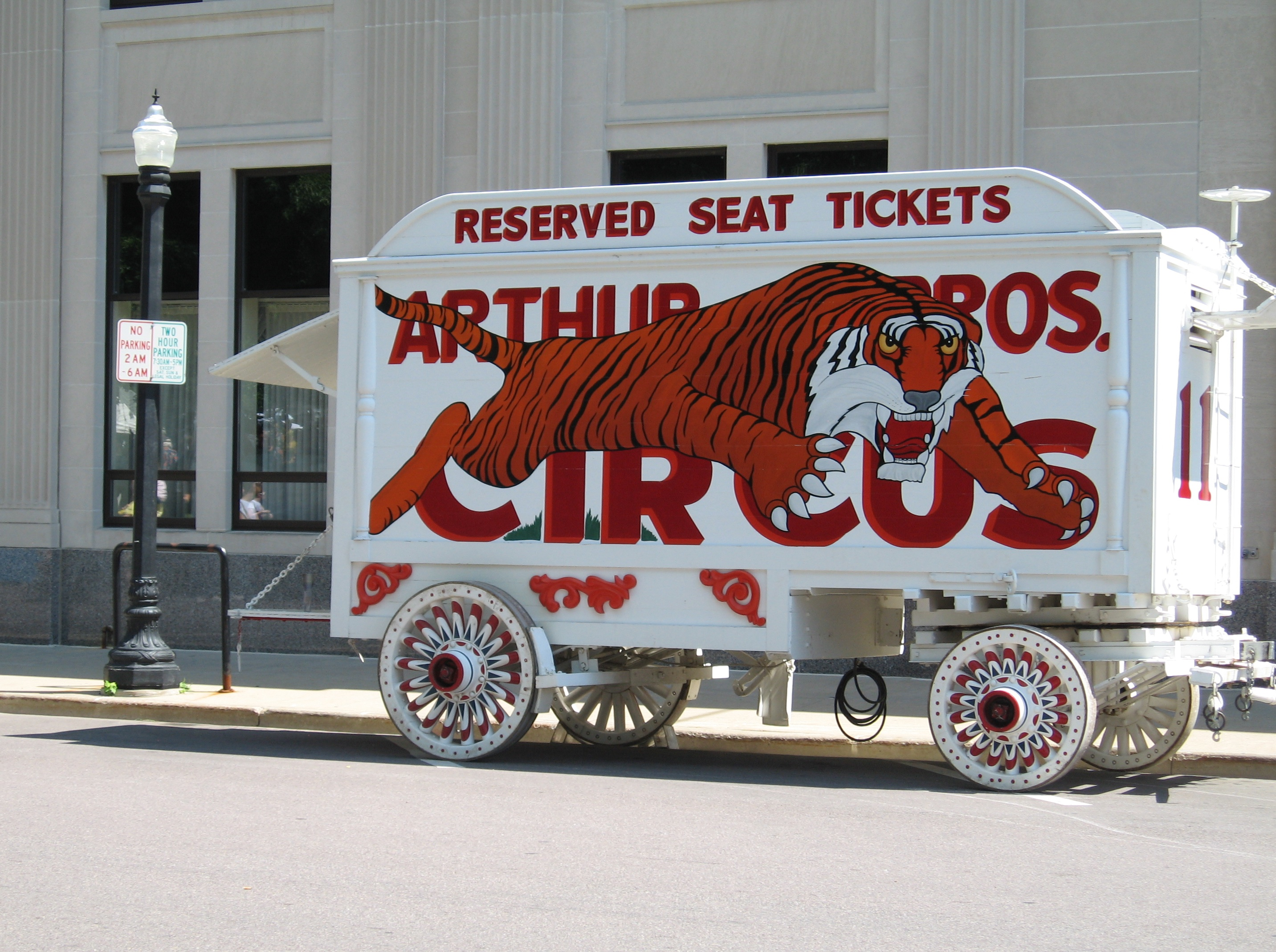
A circus wagon

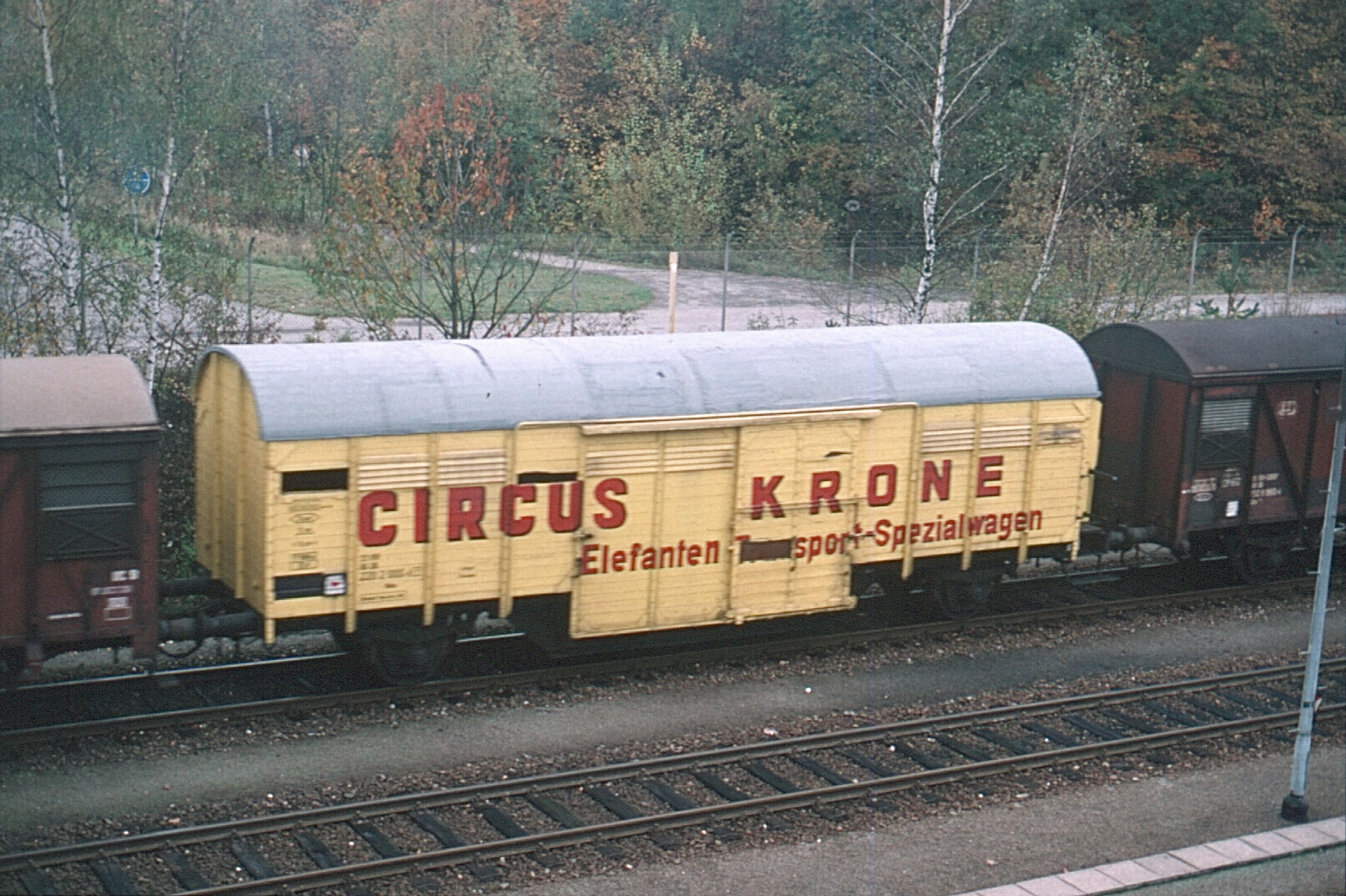
Freight car of German Circus Krone, used to transport elephants, in 1993

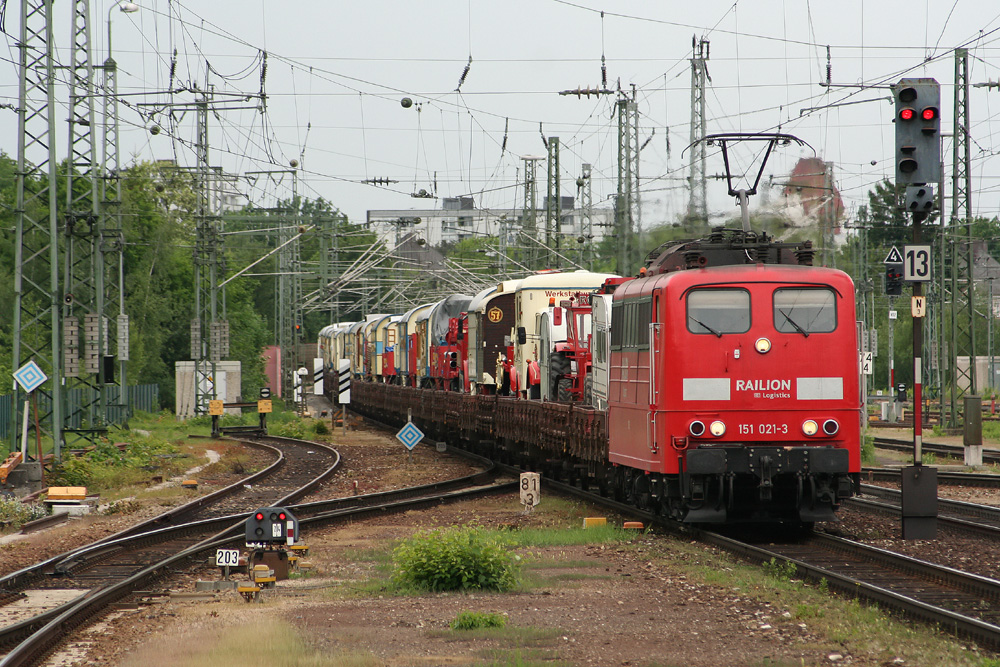
Circus Roncalli train in Germany, 2007

A circus train is a method of travel for circus troupes. One of the larger users of circus trains was the Ringling Bros. and Barnum & Bailey Circus (RBBX), a famous American circus formed when the Ringling Brothers Circus purchased the Barnum and Bailey Circus in 1907.

== History ==
=== United States ===
Circuses in the United States began traveling by rail in the 1830s, but railroad circuses were smaller in scale than their wagon-drawn counterparts. The logistics of operating a railroad circus in the mid-19th century were complex and difficult: track gauges differed across the country, financing had to be secured to pay train crews up front, and loading and unloading railcars was a time-consuming, laborious process. In comparison, circuses that traveled by horse-drawn wagon could transport their wagons directly to showgrounds.

The completion of the transcontinental railroad in 1869 marked a major milestone in the development of the American railroad, and with it the American circus. Dan Castello, proprietor of Wisconsin-based Dan Castello's Circus and Menagerie, toured by train from Omaha to California that year, enabled by the newly standardized railroads. Castello's act featured two elephants and two camels, and was financially successful.

Castello partnered with P. T. Barnum and fellow Wisconsin showman William C. Coup, and the trio launched a wagon show in 1871. The show moved to touring by train in 1872, as Coup calculated that the show could be more profitable if it traveled by train to larger towns. To support touring by train, Coup and Castello developed a new method of transporting the circus. Railroad flatcars were equipped with removable ramps, which were installed between the cars when the train was stationary. Pulleys were installed on the final car, allowing loaded wagons to be rolled down the entire length of the train, speeding up the process of loading and unloading. This system was a key predecessor of modern intermodal freight transport, which began in the early 20th century.

The size and logistical benefits of the circus train enabled rapid expansion of circus acts. As acts grew, trains became longer, and the rolling stock became more specialized. Barnum, Coup, and Castello's first train in 1872 was 1,200 feet (370 m) long, and used leased cars that were no more than 30 feet (9.1 m) long. It bought its own cars halfway through its first season, and the show's successor, the Barnum & Bailey Circus, grew to 3,600 feet (1,100 m) in 1897, using 60-foot (18 m) cars.

By the end of the 19th century, trains were firmly established as part of the American circus. In addition to transporting the circus acts themselves, smaller trains were operated by the largest circuses ahead of the main train. These advance trains were used by agents of the circus to promote shows, arrange contracts for services, and check that routes were appropriate for the main circus train. In addition to advance trains used by their own staff, circuses arranged for excursion trains for attendees, allowing rural residents to travel to cities to see the circus perform.

Circus trains have also been used by shows other than circuses, and the rapid development of American railroads had a broader impact on the performing arts than just circuses. Strates Shows, a traveling carnival, has operated a carnival train since at least the 1930s and bills itself as "America's only railroad carnival." Buffalo Bill's Wild West toured by train, and the rapid development of American railroads in the late 19th century shaped the geography and business practices of vaudeville performers and their circuits.

The number of circus trains in operation peaked in 1903. At least 38 of the 98 circuses in operation that year traveled by train, some touring the entire country via the transcontinental railroad. Railroad travel was restricted during both World War I and World War II, although circus trains were granted limited exceptions. World War I restrictions prompted the 1919 merger of the Ringling Bros. Circus and the Barnum & Bailey Circus into one massive production, and RBB&B was further set back by the Hartford circus fire of 1944.

In 1945, only 6 circuses used trains. Ringling Bros. and Barnum & Bailey continued to use a train, but it became smaller after the circus played its final show under a tent in Pittsburgh in 1956, and the show briefly switched to trucks before returning to a train. Other surviving circuses, such as the Clyde Beatty-Cole Bros. Circus, switched to trucks permanently, using the newly constructed Interstate Highway System to their advantage.

Ringling Bros. and Barnum & Bailey expanded their show in 1969, introducing two trains deemed the Blue Unit and the Red Unit, and following an alternating two-year schedule to bring a new show to each location once a year. During the 2010 season, the RBB&B Blue Unit train was made up of 59 cars, with a total length of 5,235 feet (1,596 m). The contemporary RBB&B trains carried approximately 250 performers and staff, and were nicknamed the "city without a ZIP code."

The Ringling Bros. and Barnum & Bailey Circus closed its doors in May 2017, and its train cars were either auctioned off or scrapped. Twenty cars are preserved at the educational nonprofit Kirby Family Farm in Williston, Florida, and the North Carolina Department of Transportation purchased 9 cars. The North Carolina cars were moved to a siding in Nash County, with the intention of refurbishing them for the Piedmont train service. Four cars were destroyed in a fire in 2022, and the remaining cars were scrapped or sold that year. The Ringling Bros. and Barnum & Bailey Circus resumed performances in 2023, traveling by truck.

Strates Shows, the final example of a carnival traveling by train, operated its final carnival train for the 2019 season. Fairs were cancelled during the COVID-19 pandemic, and Strates resumed operations in 2021 with trucks. Following a dispute with CSX, Strates was unable to resume operating its train in its usual format, as a unit train traveling in one piece. A farewell train was arranged for the 2024 Erie County Fair, a longtime Strates customer, with the carnival train cars transported alongside other freight by CSX.

=== Europe ===
In Germany, several circuses began using trains to move between locations in the 19th century. Smaller circus operations gradually switched to road transport in the second half of the 20th century, but Circus Krone moved by rail until 1999 and Circus Roncalli continues to do so in 2025. While the movements were and are made in dedicated trains, the necessary flatcars and boxcars were and are supplied by DB Cargo and its predecessor companies, or private car lessors - with the exception of a special rail car to transport big elephants, which was a private car of Circus Krone.

== In popular culture ==
Famous cinematic portrayals of circus trains include 1941's Dumbo by Ben Sharpsteen, 1947's Fun and Fancy Free by Jack Kinney, Bill Roberts and Hamilton Luske, 1952's The Greatest Show on Earth by Cecil B. DeMille, the 1983 James Bond movie Octopussy, 1989's Indiana Jones and the Last Crusade by Steven Spielberg and George Lucas and 2011's Water for Elephants based on Sara Gruen's 2006 novel of the same name, by Francis Lawrence. A circus train is also a major location in Madagascar 3: Europe's Most Wanted.

== See also ==
- Hammond Circus Train Wreck
- Walter L. Main Circus train wreck
- Mighty Haag Railroad Shows toured the US and Canada by rail from 1909 to 1915.
- James Anthony Bailey
- Phineas Taylor Barnum
- Showmen's Rest
