= Joseph Nicholds =

British composer

Joseph Nicholds (ca.1785–1860) was a player of the keyed bugle and a composer of sacred music, today known as West gallery music.

== Early life ==
Nicholds was born in Coseley, Staffordshire, around 1785. and worked as a limestone-breaker in the Deepfields iron furnaces nearby. He may have also played ophicleide in the band which accompanied the singing at Providence Baptist Chapel, Coseley.

== Career ==
Sometime after 1820 Nicholds and his three sons joined the band attached to Wombwell's Travelling Menagerie, where he remained in the capacity of bandmaster for 21 years. The band, one of the first brass bands, became famous for producing excellent musicians – so much so that many people came just to hear the music, without paying to go inside to see the animals.

By 1844 he appears to have left Wombwell's menagerie, as he is described as "formerly director of Wombwell's band" in a report by The Musical World journal of a performance of his oratorio The Triumphs of Zion in Wolverhampton, on 17 September 1844. Only part of this oratorio is known to have survived, along with several of Nicholds' hymn tunes, in a collection of manuscript music associated with the Larks of Dean.

Around 1850 Nicholds moved to the Ebbw Vale area of Monmouthshire where he remained for five years. Here he published The Monmouthshire Melodist, a collection of psalm and hymn tunes and anthems, with several pieces by other composers working in the area.

He returned to the Black Country around 1855, and became proprietor of the Hop & Barleycorn Inn, Coseley. His most famous work, the oratorio Babylon, was first performed in the newly completed Ebenezer Baptist Church in 1857 – however, it was not published until after his death.

== Death ==
In late 1858, Nicholds was admitted to the local workhouse, the Dudley & Sedgley Union, Shaver's End (Burton Road), where he died on 18 February 1860. On 21 February,

... various old friends of the deceased, most of them musicians, assembled at the workhouse at Shaver's End, and after singing "Oft as the bell with solemn toll" to one of the tunes which deceased had composed, which singing had a beautiful effect, they carried the coffin out, placed it in a hearse, and accompanied it to Sedgley churchyard, where the last sad rites were impressively performed, and a man much respected consigned to his final resting place."

The remains of his memorial, the tombstone, may be seen in the old Sedgley cemetery (now the Garden of Rest), placed into the ground close to the centre of the park – only the inscribed tablet survives of what was a 10-ft tall obelisk-topped monument. It reads:

THIS
MONUMENT WAS ERECTED
IN 1871 BY PUBLIC SUBSCRIPTION,
AS A TRIBUTE OF RESPECT.
IN
AFFECTIONATE REMEMBRANCE OF
JOSEPH NICHOLDS
A NATIVE OF COSELEY
WHO DIED FEB^{Y} 18TH 1860.
AND WAS AUTHOR OF THE FOLLOWING
WORKS OF SACRED MUSIC,
THE FRUITS OF BENEVOLENCE.
GABRIELS HARP.
THE TRIUMPHS OF ZION.
THE ORATORIO OF BABYLON.
THE MONMOUTHSHIRE MELODIST.
THE SONGS OF ZION.

"They rest from their labour and their
works do follow them."

- 'Nicholds Close' in Coseley, WV14 9JS, is named after the composer.

== Known published work ==
- Sacred Music, A Selection of Psalm & Hymn Tunes, Adapted to Public Worship and figured for the Organ, Piano Forte &c. (London: for the Author, 1829).
- Gabriel's Harp, Original Sacred Melodies. not located.
- "Fruits of Benevolence" – Tunes and Pieces adapted for Anniversaries, Charity Sermons, &c. not located.
- Triumphs of Zion – consisting of Airs, Duets, Choruses, &c., with Instrumental Accompaniment. [Oratorio] c.1844. printed copy not located; partial copy in manuscript (see section below).
- The Songs of Zion. not located.
- The Monmouthshire Melodist: A Select Variety of Congregational Tunes, together with Six Original Anthems. (London: Joseph Hart, c.1850). First edition not located.
- Second (Copyright) Edition of the Monmouthshire Melodist and Supplement: A Work containing original Pieces, suitable for Chapel and Sunday School Anniversaries; Also, a Variety of Chants, Tunes, &c. by Various Authors, Especially adapted for Congregational Use; The whole Edited and Arranged for the Organ, Pianoforte, &c., by the late Joseph Nicholds. (Birmingham: George Sage, and London: John Shepherd, [supplement published Bristol: Henry Keeler], c.1869).
- Babylon, An Oratorio. Composed c.1857, first published 1861. Several editions, including a revision by Cornelius Ward, and a Tonic sol-fa edition in English and Welsh, 1866.
- 'Abergwaun', hymn tune, published in John Ambrose Lloyd's, Casgliad o Donau, (Liverpool: J. Jones, 1843)
- 'Swansea', hymn tune, published in William Jacob's Eos Cymru (Llanidloes: J. M. Jones, 1844)
- 'Funeral Hymn: Hear what the voice', published in Thomas Jarman's The Voice of Melody, (London: unknown, c.1850).
- 3 anthems ('The Star of Bethlehem'; 'Joy to the World'; 'Arm of the Lord') in English and Welsh published in D.O. Evans, Temple Gems. (Gemau y Deml.), (Youngstown, Ohio: D.O. Evans, 1889).
- 'Dudley Castle', hymn tune, published in John Fawcett's Melodia Divina, (London: F. Pitman, Hart; 3rd edition c.1870).

== Works in manuscript ==
- [The] Redemption, oratorio. In a manuscript (1845–1848) by Moses Heap in the Larks of Dean collection (with Triumphs of Zion, possibly only extracts), Lancashire Archives, Preston.
- Miriam, oratorio. lost.
- The Fall of Babylon, anthem. In a manuscript (1848) by David Lewis in the National Library of Wales; along with a hymn tune, 'Nicholds'.
- Several psalm & hymn tunes in the Larks of Dean collection, and a few isolated examples in other manuscript collections.

== Video clips ==
- Courage on YouTube, hymn sung by Stream of Sound Choir
- Preparation on YouTube, the hymn sung at Nicholds' deathbed, sung by Stream of Sound Choir
- Union on YouTube, hymn sung by Stream of Sound Choir
