= Travelling menagerie =

Touring group of showmen and animal handlers

A travelling menagerie was a touring group of showmen and animal handlers who visited towns and cities with common and exotic animals. The term "menagerie", first used in seventeenth century France, was primarily used to refer to aristocratic or royal animal collections. Most visitors to travelling menageries would never have the opportunity to see such animals under other circumstances and their arrival in a town would catalyse great excitement. The shows were both entertaining and educational; in 1872 The Scotsman described George Wombwell's travelling menagerie as "[having] done more to familiarise the minds of the masses of our people with the denizens of the forest than all the books of natural history ever printed during its wandering existence."

== Europe ==
In England travelling menageries had first appeared at the turn of the eighteenth century, but did not gain widespread popularity until closer to the beginning of the nineteenth century. In contrast to the aristocratic menageries, these travelling animal collections were run by showmen who met the craving for sensation of the ordinary population. These animal shows ranged in size but the largest was George Wombwell's which, by 1839, totalled fifteen wagons. By 1880 Bostock and Wombwell's Royal National Menagerie had eighteen ″huge and spacious carriages″ and over six hundred beasts to take on the annual tour.

== North America ==
The first exotic animal known to have been exhibited in America was a lion, in Boston in 1710, followed five years later in the same city by a camel. A sailor arrived in Philadelphia in August 1727 with another lion, which he exhibited in the city and surrounding towns for eight years. The first elephant was imported from India to America by a ship’s captain, Jacob Crowninshield, in 1796. It was first displayed in New York City and travelled extensively up and down the East Coast. In 1834 James and William Howes’ New York Menagerie toured New England with an elephant, a rhinoceros, a camel, a zebra, a wildebeest, two tigers, a polar bear, and several parrots and monkeys.

America's touring menageries slowed to a crawl under the weight of the depression of the 1840s and then to a halt with the outbreak of the Civil War. Only one travelling menagerie of any size existed after the war: Isaac A. Van Amburgh's menagerie travelled the United States for nearly forty years. Unlike their European counterparts, America's menageries and circuses had combined as single travelling shows, with one ticket to see both. This increased the size and the diversity of their collections. Ringling Bros. and Barnum & Bailey Circus advertised their shows as the "World's Greatest Menagerie".

== See also ==
- Lion taming
