= Lord George Sanger =

English showman and circus proprietor

George Sanger
- Born: 23 December 1825; Newbury, Berkshire
- Died: 28 November 1911 (aged 85); East Finchley, London
- Other names: Lord George Sanger
- Occupation: circus proprietor

'Lord' George Sanger (23 December 1825 (Note: Brenda Assael in the Oxford Dictionary of National Biography gives Sanger's date of birth as "23 December probably in 1825". In his autobiography, Sanger gave the date "December 23rd, 1827".) – 28 November 1911) was an English showman and circus proprietor. Born to a showman father, he grew up working in travelling peep shows. He successfully ran shows and circuses throughout much of the nineteenth century with his brother John. He retired in 1905 and was murdered by a disgruntled employee in 1911.

== Early life ==
Sanger was born on 23 December, probably 1825, in Newbury, Berkshire to James Sanger. James Sanger, the son of a Wiltshire farmer, had been pressed into the service of the Royal Navy at a young age, where he learned conjuring tricks, and later, as a navy pensioner, became a showman. He and his wife, named Sarah Elliott, travelled the country in a caravan, showing human curiosities and a peep show. After they began to have children, the family settled in Trowbridge and then Newbury, where George was born.

George Sanger was the sixth of ten children, and the youngest son. The children grew up helping with their father's business. As a young man, Sanger made his first start in business, independent of his father, as an animal tamer. His first "troupe" consisted of canaries, redpoles, white mice and later, hares. He taught them to fire miniature cannons and walk tightropes. The show was a success and he exhibited at private parties, although he drew a few accusations of witchcraft from rural villagers.

== Partnership ==
Sanger started a travelling conjuring show with his older brothers William and John. Sanger had earned the nickname "Gentleman George" from fellow showmen, and "his Lordship" from his father, for the smart way he dressed. In 1848, the three brothers took their show to Stepney Fair. Here, he renewed an acquaintance with a woman he knew from his childhood called Ellen Chapman. She was a lion tamer employed by George Wombwell, known professionally as Madame Pauline de Vere. They married on 1 December 1850 in Sheffield.

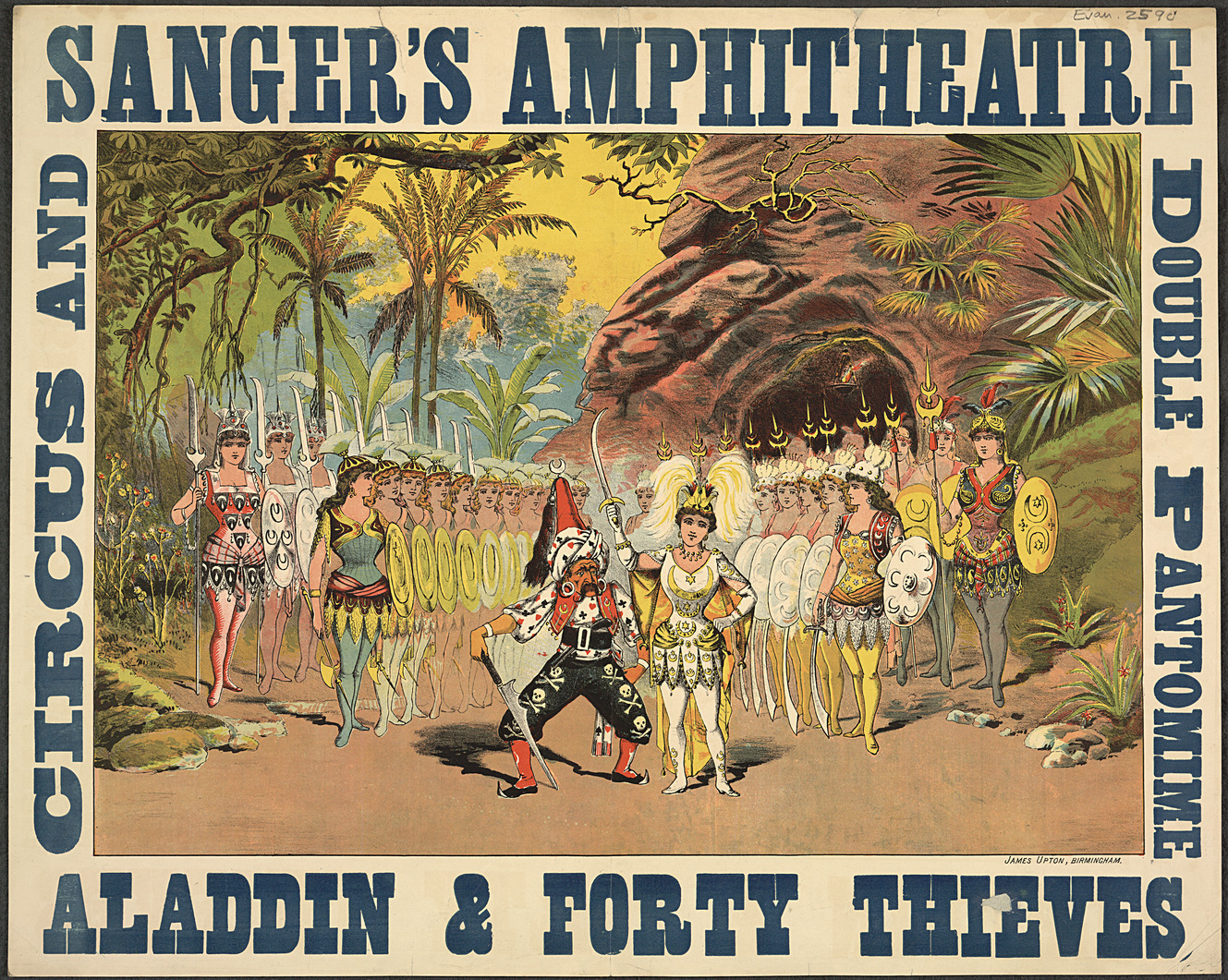
Poster for Aladdin & Forty Thieves at Sanger's Amphitheatre in 1886

John and George Sanger decided to take their show to country fairs, believing that they would make more money than at the fairs in London. In the winter of 1850–51 they returned to London and, in addition to their conjuring show, they rented Enon Chapel off Aldwych—a former charnel house— to run a "sort of winter theatrical show". They employed actors and put on a Christmas pantomime. After being informed that not all of the bodies improperly buried at the site had been removed, and that the authorities intended to close the building, the Sangers moved out.

In 1851, the brothers took their show to The Great Exhibition fair in Knightsbridge, an event that, due to heavy rain, was a disappointment to the showmen. The fair was abandoned and the Sangers moved on to the north of England. After another successful season at Stepney Fair (with a 'tame oyster'), the brothers decided to start a circus. Their first purchase for the circus was a Welsh pony, for £7 and their assistants were two nieces, a nephew and four apprentices.

In 1870, whilst still in partnership with brother John Sanger, George became a partner with the Mayor of Margate, Kent, Thomas Dalby Reeve to run an unused railway station in Margate named 'Hall-By-The-Sea' being used as a restaurant/dance hall. A salt marsh lying alongside was soon purchased to expand the business. In 1875 Reeve died and Sanger became sole proprietor and developed the site into pleasure gardens with various entertainment, a menagerie, lake, rides, skating and sideshows alongside the dance hall. The site was sold in 1919 to entrepreneur John Henry Iles who developed it into the Dreamland amusement park.

In 1871, the Sanger brothers bought Astley's Amphitheatre for £11,000 and George Sanger ran it for 28 years until the London County Council ordered it to be closed in 1893. Sanger ended his professional relationship with his brother John in 1884.

== Later life ==
From the 1880s, Sanger became active in defending the rights of showmen and was the president of the Van Dwellers Protection Association (which later became the Showmen's Guild of Great Britain).

George Sanger built his Amphitheatre on the corner of High Street and George Street in Ramsgate, Kent, in 1883. Initially it was a circus building but was also used for opera and drama from its early days.

The building was converted to a theatre in 1908 by Frank Matcham, a well known and prolific builder of theatres, and was renamed the Royal Palace Theatre. Films were also shown and in 1929 the theatre was equipped to facilitate talking movies. Films, variety and theatre continued until early 1961 when the last pint was pulled in Sangers Bar and the theatre was demolished along with the adjoining Sanger's Hotel.

In 1903, he presented a statue of Queen Victoria to the town of Newbury, to stand in the same position occupied by his father's stall years before.

In 1905, Sanger sold off his zoo and circus effects, auctioned by circus auctioneer Tom Norman. He retired to Park Farm in East Finchley, north London, and published an autobiography in 1910.

== Death ==
On 28 November 1911 George Sanger was murdered with a hatchet at his home by employee Herbert Charles Cooper, for unknown reasons. Cooper then committed suicide on a railway line. Sanger was buried on 4 December next to his wife's grave in Margate.

== Works ==
- Sanger, George (1926) [1910], Seventy Years a Showman, New York: E. P. Dutton, OCLC 3775375
