= Ellen Chapman (lion tamer) =

British circus performer and lion tamer (1831–1899)

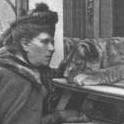
- with a big cat
- Born: 1831
- Died: 30 April 1899 (aged 67–68); Tottenham
- Other name: Madame Pauline de Vere
- Occupation: Lion tamer
- Employer: George Wombwell
- Spouse: Lord George Sanger
- Children: 3 (2 became adults)

Ellen Chapman later Ellen Sanger appearing as Madame Pauline de Vere (1831 – 30 April 1899) was a British circus performer and lion tamer. She was said to be the first woman to put her head in a lion's jaws and a demonstration impressed Queen Victoria.

== Life ==
Chapman was born in 1831. She was brought up by the Manders family who worked with George Wombwell who ran a travelling circus. Her mother was unknown but her father was called Harry Chapman and he made a living running a peep show. Wombwell owned exotic animals including big cats. Chapman had no education and was illiterate.

Chapman became known as Madame Pauline de Vere who was a "lion tamer". She was said to the first woman to put her head in a lion's mouth. When she was interviewed about her bravery she said that it was just routine and she performed each show with no thought for any danger.

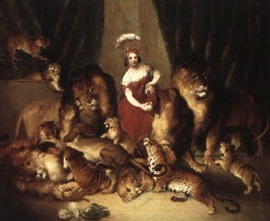
painting by George Christopher Horner

Wombwell was invited to the royal court on five occasions to exhibit his animals, three times before Queen Victoria. In 1847 the Queen Victoria noted the bravery of the "British Lion Queen" who appeared with lions, leopards and tigers. She was given a personal audience with the Queen and was given a gold watch and chain. The following year she met George Sanger again; they had met when they were children, as their fathers had similar businesses. They corresponded and Sanger noticed that her boss was not keen on the romance. He estimated that Wombwells may have made £100 a day from her shows.

Chapman married Wombwell's business rival "Lord" George Sanger in Sheffield on 1 December 1850. They had two children although one source says three but only two Laurina and Sarah Harriet survived to be adults. At the Sanger circus she would ride a horse made up to look like "Lady Godiva", appear as Brittania and dance inside the lions den. The Sangers had ten permanent circuses.

Her daughter, Laurina, performed on horseback in the circus. She would marry Alexander Coleman who was said to be Queen Victoria's favourite clown.

Chapman continued to perform in her sixties. She was recreating her "serpentine dance" inside a lion's den in Merthyr Tydfil in 1895. She died in Tottenham in 1899.
