= Enon Chapel =

Former chapel in London, England

Coordinates: 51°30′52″N 0°7′2″W

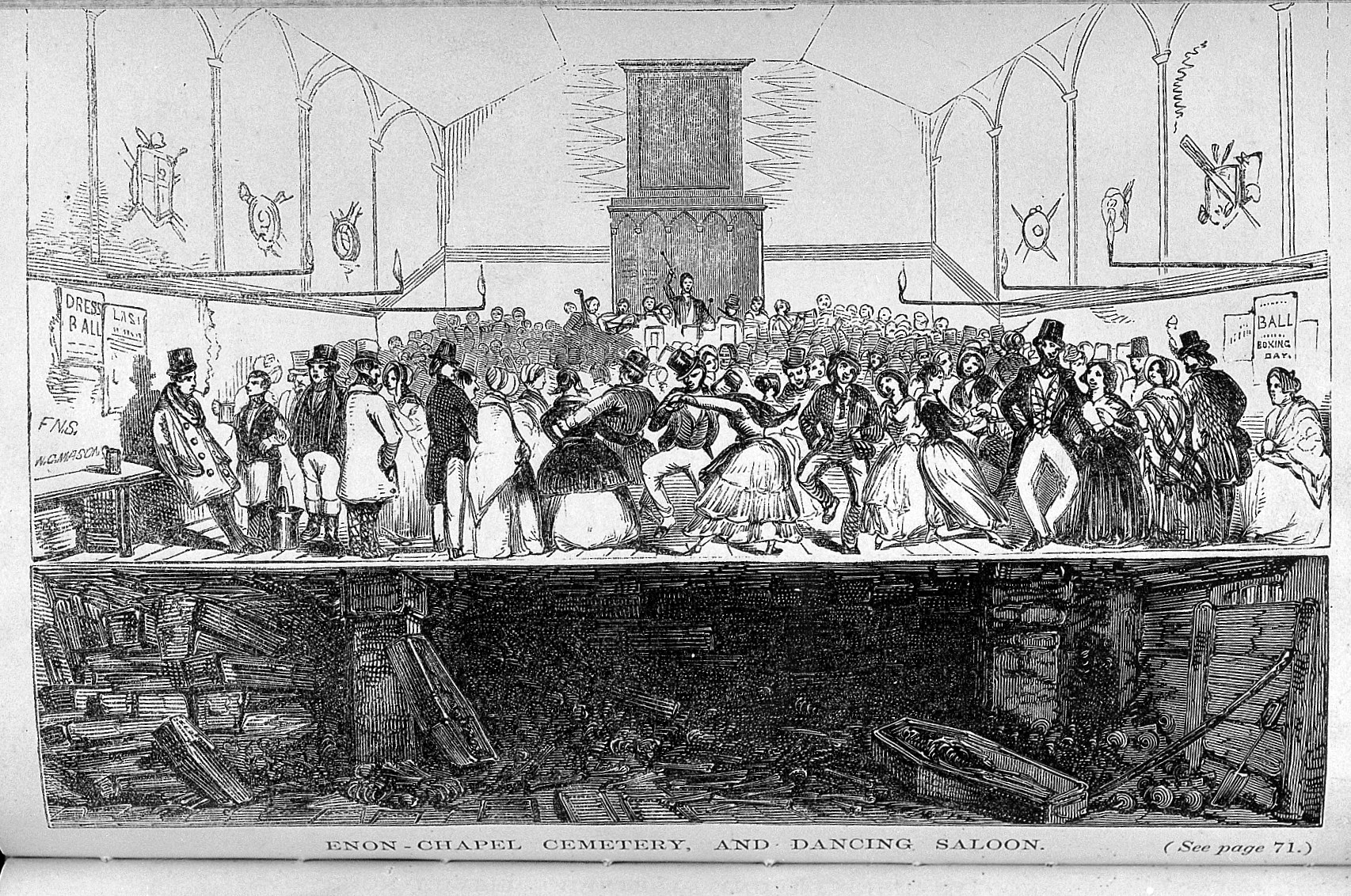
Illustration from G.A. Walker's Lectures on the metropolitan grave-yards, depicting Enon Chapel as a dance hall

Enon Chapel was a building on Clement's Lane (today St. Clement's Lane) off Aldwych near the Strand in London and it was built around 1823. The upper part was dedicated to the worship of God, with the dead buried in a vault beneath, separated by a board floor. The chapel was notorious for allegations that thousands of bodies had been packed into the vault room in the space of 20 years.

When the Burial Act 1852 (15 & 16 Vict. c. 85) closed burial grounds in the centre of London, the chapel closed. It later became a theatre and dancing saloon, before being demolished. According to Sanger, the Law Courts now stand on part of the site.

== Burials ==
The chapel was named for Aenon near Salim (Enon), a place where John the Baptist carried out baptisms. (John 3:23)

According to George Sanger's 1910 biography Seventy Years a Showman, Enon Chapel was licensed for burials in 1823, which continued until the minister died in early 1842. The vaults beneath the meeting-house were turned into a burial place, which Walter Thornbury's 1887 Old and New London says "soon became filled with coffins up to the very rafters, so that there was only the wooden flooring between the living youth and the festering dead".

In 1840 it was alleged to a House of Lords select committee that the remains of "ten or twelve thousand" bodies had been concealed in a vault beneath Enon Chapel. It was said that the chapel's Reverend Howse had offered burials for a low fee of 15 shillings, and that to do this he placed the bodies into a 60-by-40-foot (18 by 12 m) pit under the chapel, possibly using a large amount of quicklime to accelerate their decomposition. One witness attested to "at least twenty interments a week", and others believed that the vault housed an open sewer carrying the bodies to the Thames. It was said that worshippers breathed in the noxious fumes of rotting flesh from the burial room below for years before the hoard of bodies was discovered. One witness attested to those praying in the church regularly experiencing fainting and sickness due to the fumes.

In April 1842, some members of the select committee visited Enon Chapel. They reported that they were prevented from going down into the vault of the building, with a Colonel Fox saying that "I thought, through the crevices, I could perceive bones; there was nothing, at all events, but the planking". On being denied access to the vault, Colonel Acton judged that from the "extreme unwillingness, and violence, indeed, of the keeper of Enon Chapel, that there must be a very great body of injurious matter concealed". The group detected none of the reported "effluvia" in the air, putting this down to the "brisk air" of that day, and the fact that some of the party had been smoking.

Writing on the subject in 1843, physician John Snow concluded that it would have been impossible to conceal thousands of bodies in the space described. He wrote that the vault had a bricked-over barrel sewer rather than the open sewer described by some witnesses, and noted that any sewer would soon have become blocked if used to dispose of the dead. Upon visiting the building Snow could see none of the "crevices" mentioned by Fox, and he described the reports to the committee as having been "a mass of fictitious horrors".

In 1847, George Walker, a prominent surgeon, bought the chapel and at his own expense of £100 had the bodies in the vault removed to Norwood Cemetery where they were reburied in a single grave twelve feet square and twenty feet deep. Writing in 1887, Walter Thornbury describes the excavation of the vault resulting in "a pyramid of human bones [...] exposed to view, separated from piles of coffin wood in various stages of decay", which would go on to fill "four up-heaved van loads". Thornbury claims the site was visited by six thousand people during this time.

This scandal contributed to burial reform in the Burial Act 1852 (15 & 16 Vict. c. 85), which closed burial grounds within metropolitan London and allowed the establishment of large cemeteries in the then surrounding countryside in the mid-19th century.

== Later usage ==
Walker sold the chapel on and George Sanger, the circus impresario, briefly took the lease in December 1850, fitting it out as a theatre for pantomime and circus. However, after being informed by the police that George Walker had not finished emptying the vault and that the remains of the minister, amongst others, were still there, Sanger rapidly moved out.

New owners of the building covered the existing wooden floor with a single brick floor, in turn covered by a new wooden floor, and opened the premises as a "low dancing-saloon". An old bill shows that dancing on the dead was one of the attractions of the place;

"Enon Chapel - Dancing on the Dead - Admission Threepence. No lady or gentleman admitted unless wearing shoes and stockings."

The scene was caricatured by Cruikshank.
