= Ringling Bros. and Barnum & Bailey Circus =

Traveling circus company

- Ringling Bros. and Barnum & Bailey Circus's logo since 2023

Origin
- Country: United States
- Founder(s): The Ringling brothers; P. T. Barnum; James Anthony Bailey
- Year founded: April 10, 1871 (155 years ago) (original); 2023 (3 years ago) (Revival)
- Defunct: 2017; 9 years ago (original)

Information
- Operator(s): Feld Entertainment
- Traveling show?: Yes
- Circus tent?: No (post-1957)
- Winter quarters: Ellenton, Florida, U.S.
- Website: www.ringling.com

The Ringling Bros. and Barnum & Bailey Circus, or simply Ringling, is an American traveling circus company billed as The Greatest Show on Earth. It and its predecessors have run shows from 1871, with a hiatus from 2017 to 2023. The circus started in 1919 when the Barnum & Bailey's Greatest Show on Earth, a circus created by P. T. Barnum and James Anthony Bailey, was merged with the Ringling Bros. World's Greatest Shows. The Ringling brothers purchased Barnum & Bailey Ltd. in 1907 following Bailey's death in 1906, but ran the circuses separately until they were merged in 1919.

After 1957, the circus no longer exhibited under its own portable "big top" tents, instead using permanent venues such as sports stadiums and arenas. In 1967, Irvin Feld and his brother Israel, along with Houston judge Roy Hofheinz, bought the circus from the Ringling family. In 1971, the Felds and Hofheinz sold the circus to Mattel, buying it back from the toy company in 1981. Since the death of Irvin Feld in 1984, the circus has continued to be a part of Feld Entertainment, an international entertainment firm headed by his son Kenneth Feld, with its headquarters in Ellenton, Florida.

In May 2017, with weakening attendance, many animal rights protests, and high operating costs, the circus performed its final animal show at Nassau Veterans Memorial Coliseum and closed.

In September 2023, after a six-year hiatus, a relaunched animal-free circus returned with its first show in Bossier City, Louisiana. It also did not include clowns or a ringmaster.

== History ==
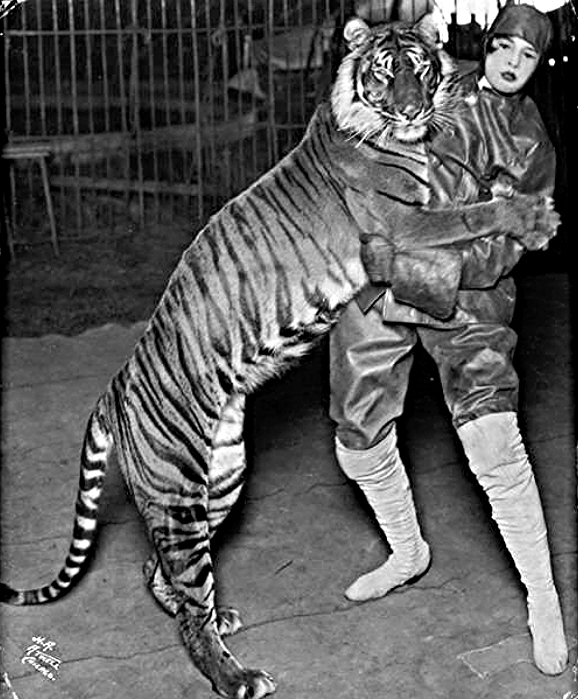
A Bali tiger with its tamer, Rose Flanders Bascom, in Ringling Bros (c. 1915)

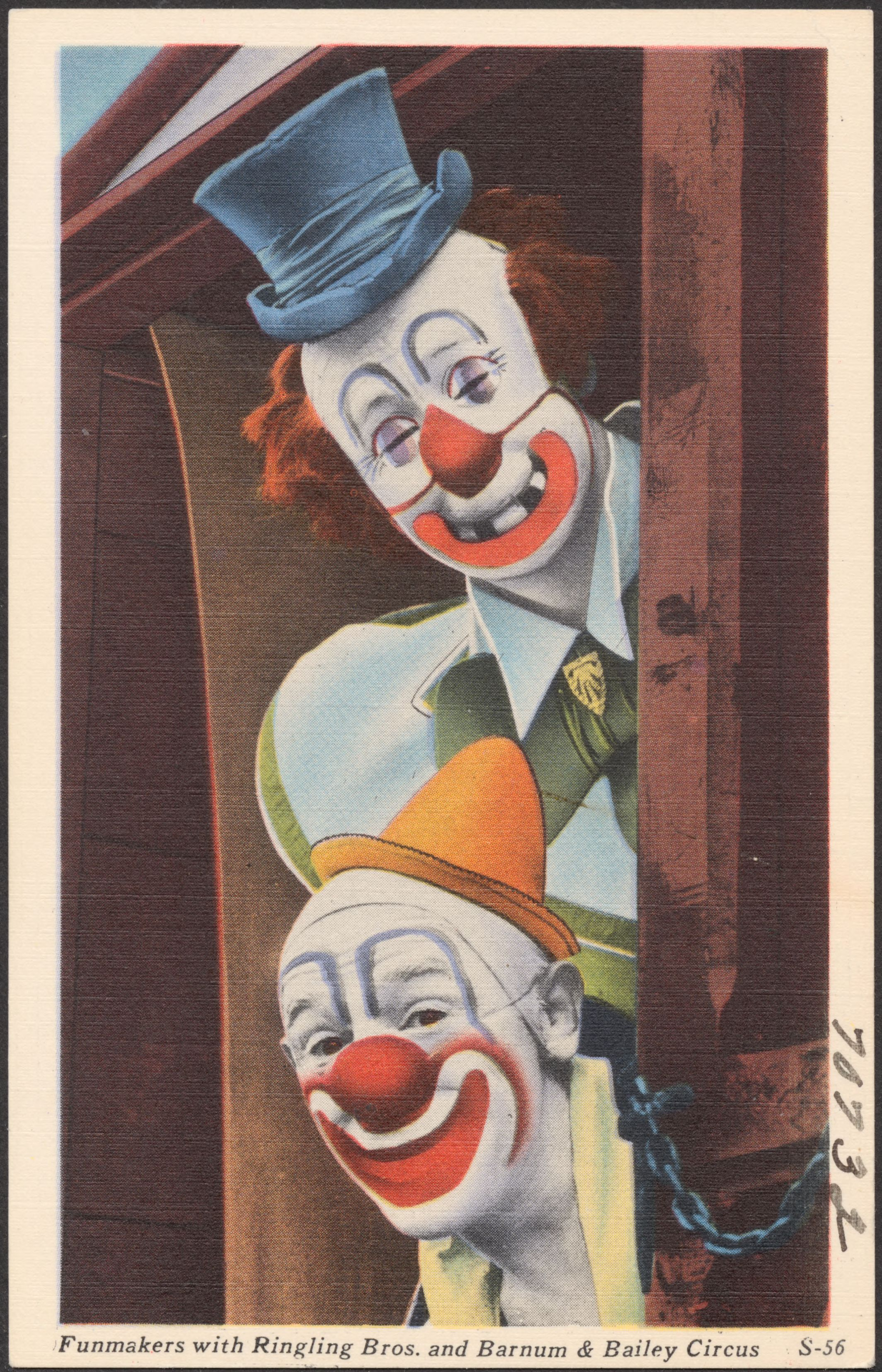
Whiteface clowns Lou Jacobs and Paul Jerome (c. 1930-35)

=== Predecessor circuses ===
Hachaliah Bailey appears to have established one of the earliest circuses in the United States after he purchased an African elephant, whom he named "Old Bet", around 1806, just 13 years after John Bill Ricketts first brought the circus to the United States from Great Britain. P. T. Barnum, who as a boy had worked as a ticket seller for Hachaliah Bailey's show, had run the Barnum's American Museum from New York City since 1841 from the former Scudder's American Museum building.

Besides building up the existing exhibits, Barnum brought in animals to add zoo-like elements, and a freak show. During this time, Barnum took the Museum on road tours, named "P.T. Barnum's Grand Traveling American Museum". The Museum burned down in July 1865. Though Barnum attempted to re-establish the Museum at another location in the city, it too burned down in 1868, and Barnum opted to retire from the museum business.

Circus Waltz

In 1871, Dan Castello and William Cameron Coup persuaded Barnum to come out of retirement to lend his name, know-how, and financial backing to the circus they had already created in Delavan, Wisconsin. The combined show was named "P.T. Barnum's Great Traveling Museum, Menagerie, Caravan, and Hippodrome". As described by Barnum, Castello and Coup "had a show that was truly immense, and combined all the elements of museum, menagerie, variety performance, concert hall, and circus", and considered it to potentially be "the Greatest Show on Earth", which subsequently became part of the circus's name.

Independently of Castello and Coup, James Anthony Bailey had teamed up with James E. Cooper to create the Cooper and Bailey Circus in the 1860s. The Cooper and Bailey Circus became the chief competitor to Barnum's circus. As Bailey's circus was outperforming his, Barnum sought to merge the circuses. The two groups agreed to combine their shows on March 28, 1881. Initially named "P.T. Barnum's Greatest Show On Earth, And The Great London Circus, Sanger's Royal British Menagerie and The Grand International Allied Shows United", it was eventually shortened to "Barnum and Bailey's Circus". Bailey was instrumental in acquiring Jumbo, advertised as the world's largest elephant, for the show.

After Jumbo died, Barnum donated his taxidermied remains to Tufts University on whose Board of Trustees Barnum served as one of Tufts' first trustees. The Barnum Museum of Natural History opened in 1884 on the Tufts campus and after his death in 1885, Jumbo became a prominent part of the display. To this day the Tufts athletic mascot is Jumbo and its athletic teams are referred to as the "Jumbos". Barnum died in 1891 and Bailey then purchased the circus from his widow. Bailey continued touring the Eastern United States until he took his circus to Europe. That tour started on December 27, 1897, and lasted until 1902.

Separately, in 1884, five of the seven Ringling brothers had started a small circus in Baraboo, Wisconsin. This was about the same time that Barnum & Bailey were at the peak of their popularity. Similar to dozens of small circuses that toured the Midwestern United States and the Northeastern United States at the time, the brothers moved their circus from town to town in small animal-drawn caravans. Their circus rapidly grew and they were soon able to move their circus by train, which allowed them to have the largest traveling amusement enterprise of that time. Bailey's European tour gave the Ringling brothers an opportunity to move their show from the Midwest to the eastern seaboard. Faced with the new competition, Bailey took his show west of the Rocky Mountains for the first time in 1905. He died the next year, and the circus was sold to the Ringling Brothers.

=== Ringling Bros. and Barnum & Bailey Circus ===
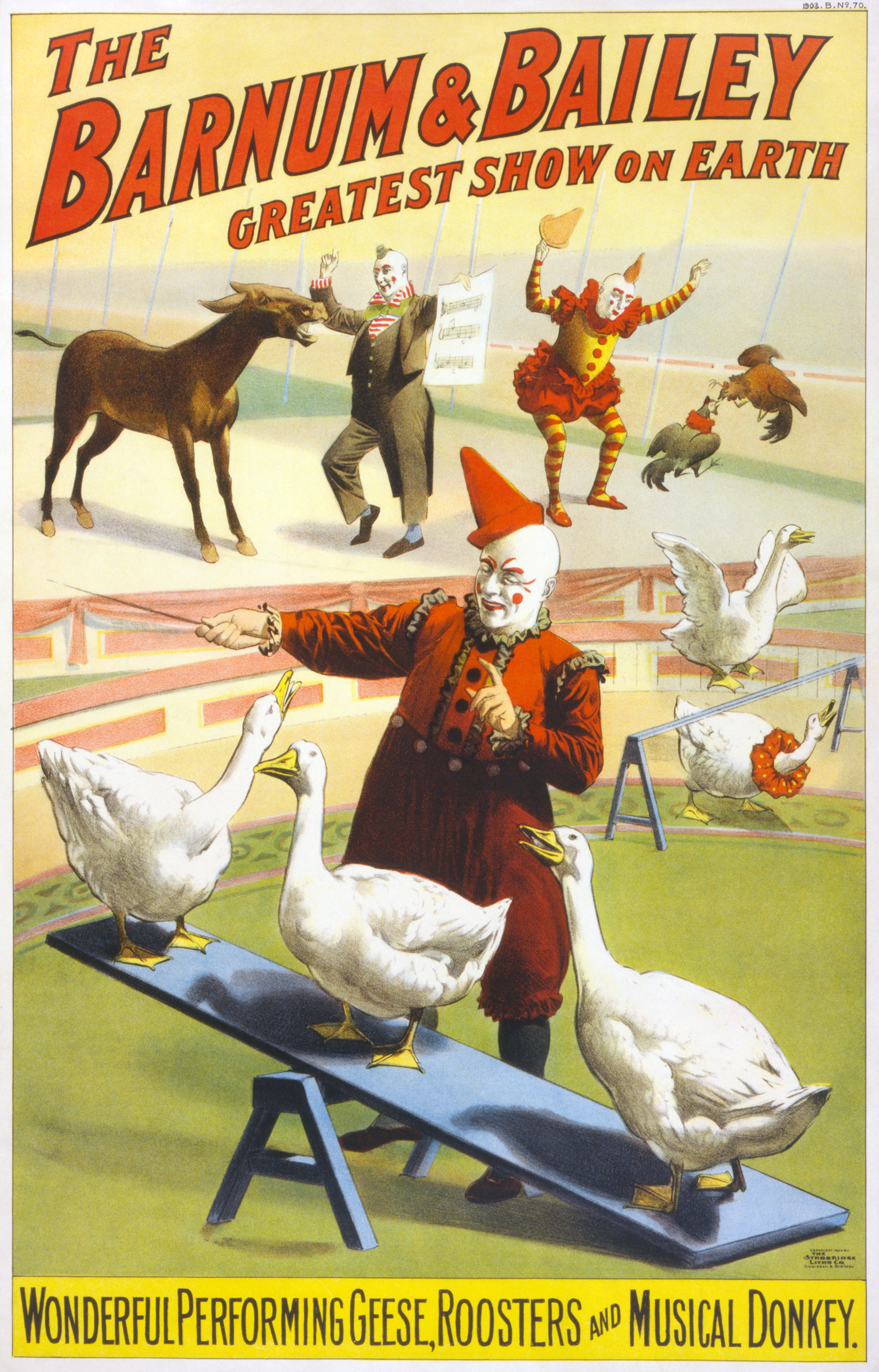
An advertisement for the Barnum & Bailey Circus, 1900

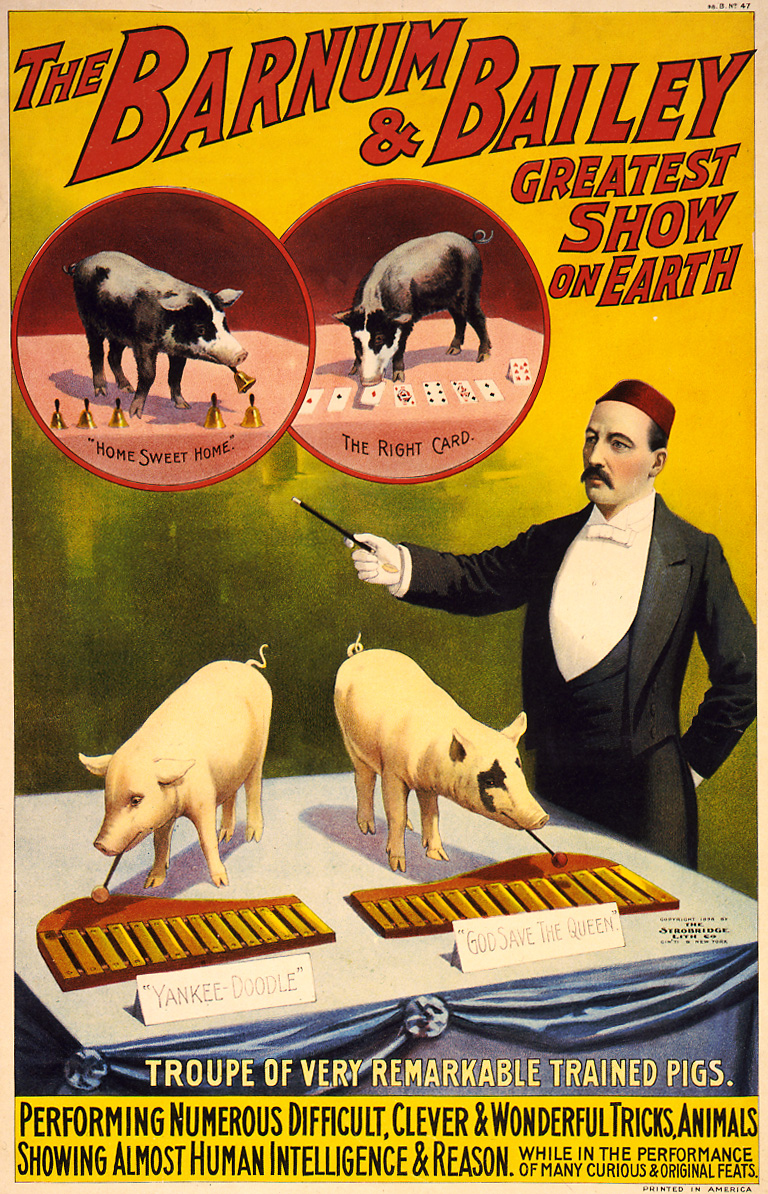
A poster from 1898, advertising a "troupe of very remarkable trained pigs"

The Ringlings purchased the Barnum & Bailey Greatest Show on Earth in 1907 and ran the circuses separately until 1919. By that time, Charles Edward Ringling and John Nicholas Ringling were the only remaining brothers of the five who founded the circus. They decided that it was too difficult to run the two circuses independently because of labour shortages and complications to rail travel brought about by American involvement in World War I, and on March 29, 1919, "Ringling Bros. and Barnum & Bailey Combined Shows" debuted in New York City. The posters declared, "The Ringling Bros. World's Greatest Shows and the Barnum & Bailey Greatest Show on Earth are now combined into one record-breaking giant of all exhibitions." Charles E. Ringling died in 1926, but the circus flourished through the Roaring Twenties.

John Ringling had the circus move its headquarters to Sarasota, Florida, in 1927.

In 1929, the American Circus Corporation signed a contract to perform in New York City. John Ringling purchased American Circus, the owner of five circuses, for $1,700,000 (equal to $31,875,000 today).

In 1938, the circus made a lucrative offer to Frank Buck, a well-known adventurer and animal collector, to tour as their star attraction and to enter the show astride an elephant. He refused to join the American Federation of Actors, stating that he was "a scientist, not an actor." Though there was a threat of a strike if he did not join the union, he maintained that he would not compromise his principles, saying, "Don't get me wrong. I'm with the working man. I worked like a dog once myself. And my heart is with the fellow who works. But I don't want some ... union delegate telling me when to get on and off an elephant." Eventually, the union gave Buck a special dispensation to introduce Gargantua the gorilla without registering as an actor.

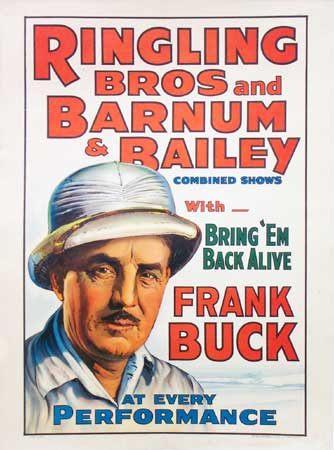
Frank Buck, star attraction, 1938

The circus suffered during the 1930s due to the Great Depression, but managed to stay in business. After John Nicholas Ringling's death, his nephew, John Ringling North, managed the indebted circus twice, the first from 1937 to 1943. Special dispensation was given to the circus by President Roosevelt to use the rails to operate in 1942, in spite of travel restrictions imposed as a result of World War II. Many of the most famous images from the circus that were published in magazine and posters were captured by American Photographer Maxwell Frederic Coplan, who traveled the world with the circus, capturing its beauty as well as its harsh realities.

North's cousin Robert Edward Ringling took over as president of the show in 1943 with North resuming the presidency of the circus in 1947.

=== Hartford circus fire ===
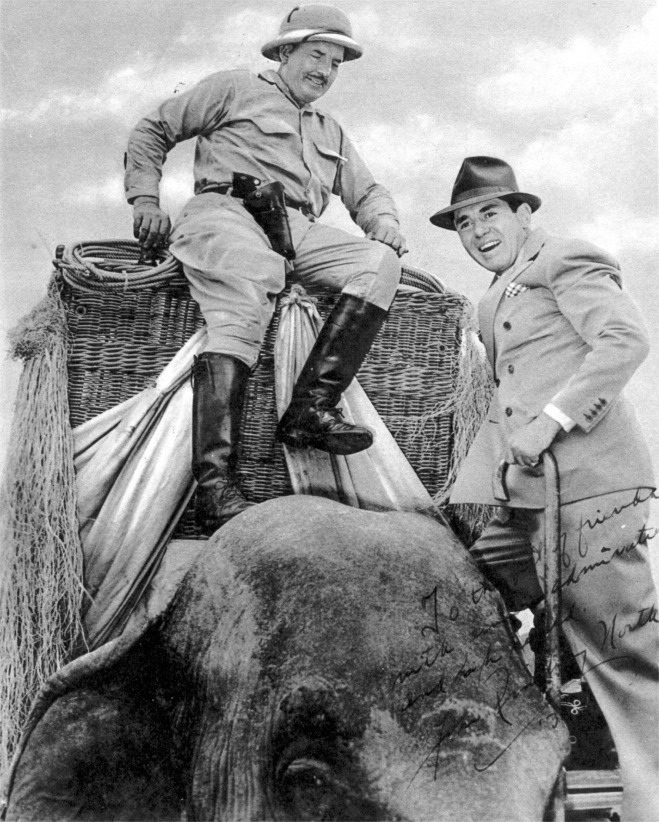
John Ringling North (right) and Frank Buck, who was the circus's featured attraction in 1938

On July 6, 1944, in Hartford, Connecticut, during an afternoon performance attended by some 8,000 people, the Big Top tent caught fire. At least 167 people were killed and many hundreds injured. Circus management was found to be negligent and several Ringling executives served sentences in jail. Ringling Brothers' management set aside all profits for the next ten years to pay the claims filed against the show by the City of Hartford and the survivors of the fire.

=== Feld family ===
The post-war prosperity enjoyed by the rest of the nation was not shared by the circus as crowds dwindled and costs increased. Public tastes, influenced by the movies and television, abandoned the circus, which gave its last performance under the big top in Pittsburgh, Pennsylvania, on July 16, 1956. An article in Life magazine reported that "a magical era had passed forever". In 1956, when John Ringling North and Arthur Concello moved the circus from a tent show to an indoor operation, Irvin Feld was one of several promoters hired to work the advance for select dates. Irvin Feld and his brother, Israel Feld, had already made a name for themselves marketing and promoting D.C. area rock and roll shows. In 1959, Ringling Bros. started wintering in Venice, Florida.

In late 1967, Irvin Feld, Israel Feld, and Judge Roy Mark Hofheinz of Texas, together with backing from Richard C. Blum, the founder of Blum Capital, bought the company outright from North and the Ringling family interests for $8,000,000 (equal to $77,245,509 today) at a ceremony at Rome's Colosseum. Irvin Feld immediately began making changes to improve the quality and profitability of the show. Irvin got rid of the freak show so as not to capitalize on others' deformations and to become more family oriented. He got rid of the more routine acts.

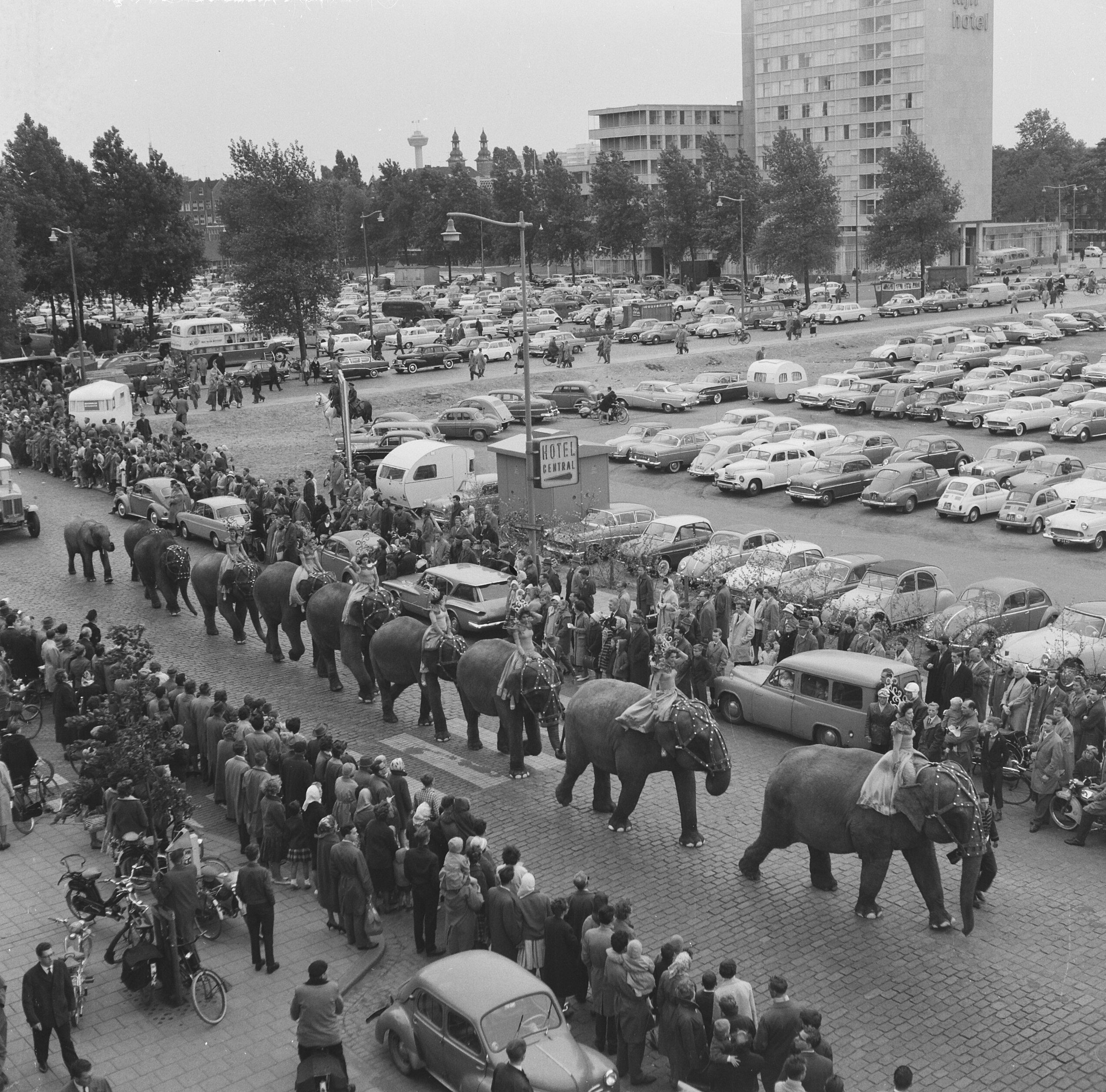
Circus Williams's elephants arriving in Rotterdam, 1961

In 1968, with the craft of clowning seemingly neglected and with many of the clowns in their 50s, he established the Ringling Bros. and Barnum & Bailey Clown College. Circus Williams, a circus in Europe was purchased for $2 million just to have its star animal trainer, Gunther Gebel-Williams, for the core of his revamped circus. Soon, he split the show into two touring units, Red and Blue, which could tour the country independently. The separate tours could also offer differing slates of acts and themes, enabling circus goers to view both tours where possible.. Also in 1968, Feld hired The King Charles Troupe, a unicycle club from The Bronx and the first ever African-American circus troupe, to perform unicycle basketball for 18 years with the circus. Performing unicyclists also included Ted Jorgensen.

The company was taken public in 1969. In 1970, Feld's only son Kenneth joined the company and became a co-producer. The circus was sold to the Mattel company in 1971 for $40,000,000 (equal to $317,995,070 today), with the Feld family retained as management.

After Walt Disney World opened near Orlando, Florida, in 1971, the circus attempted to cash in on the resulting tourism surge by opening Circus World theme park in nearby Haines City, which broke ground in April 1973. The theme park was expected to become the circus's winter home as well as to have the Clown College located there. Mattel placed the circus corporation up for sale in December 1973 despite its profit contributions, as Mattel as a whole had a $29.9 million loss (equal to $230,137,232 today) in 1972. The park's opening was delayed until February 1974.

Venture Out in America, Inc., a Gulf Oil recreational subsidiary, bought the combined shows in January 1974, and the opening was further pushed back to 1975. While the Circus Showcase for Circus World opened on February 21, 1974, Venture Out placed the purchase deal back into negotiations, and the opening of the complex was moved to early 1976.

By May 1980, the company expanded to three circuses by adding the one-ring International Circus Festival of Monte Carlo that debuted in Japan and Australia. The Felds bought the circus back in 1982 less Circus World. Irvin Feld died in 1984 and the company has since been run by Kenneth.

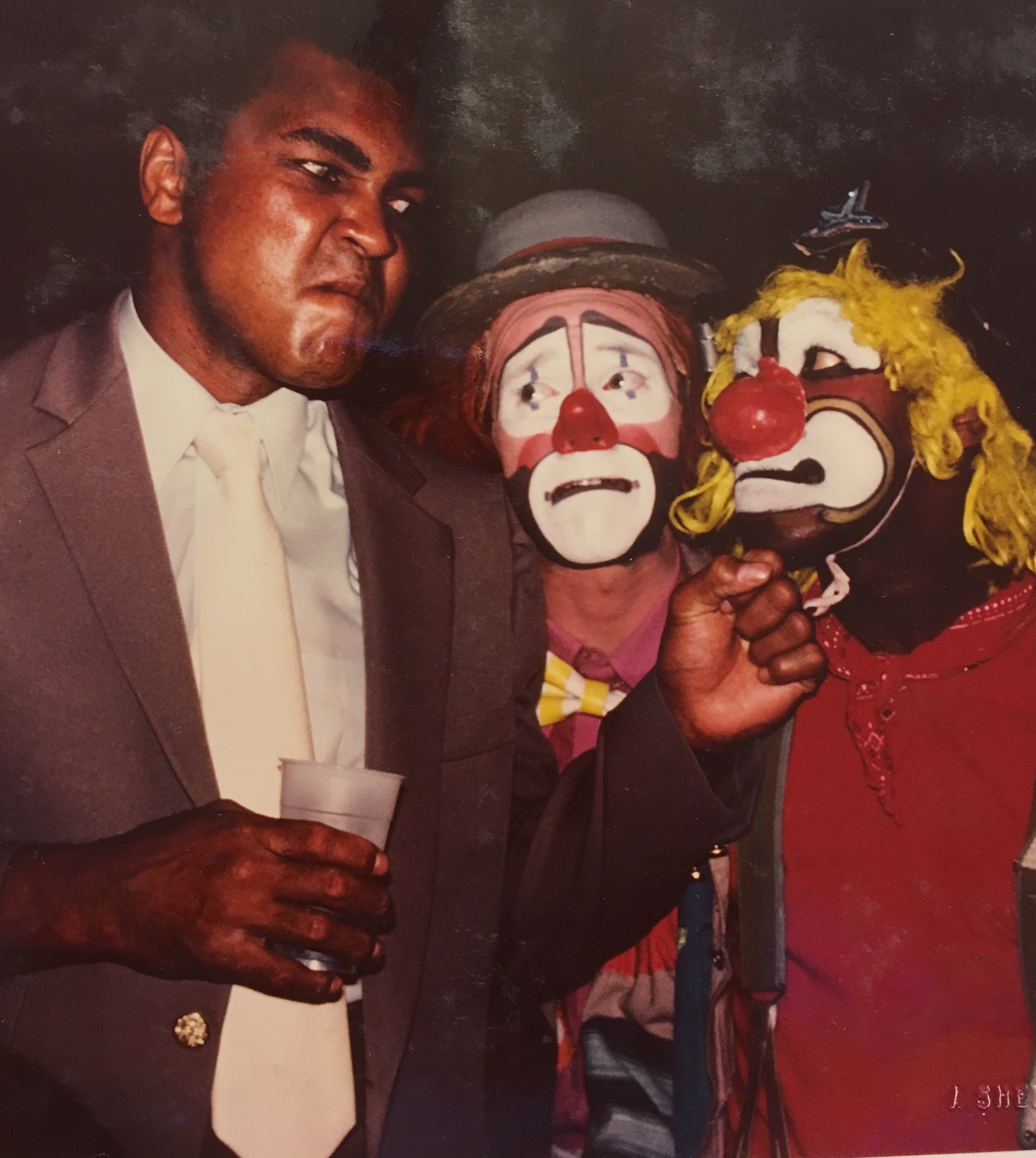
Muhammad Ali with clowns Charlie Frye and Skeeter Reece at a Ringling performance in 1980

In 1990, the Seminole Gulf Railway, who took over the rail line serving the Venice facility in 1987, could no longer support the show's train cars, which led the combined circus to move its winter base to the Florida State Fairgrounds in Tampa. In 1993, the clown college was moved from the Venice Arena to Baraboo, Wisconsin. In 1995, the company founded the Center for Elephant Conservation (CEC).

Clair George has testified in court that he worked as a consultant in the early 1990s for Kenneth Feld and the Ringling Brothers and Barnum & Bailey Circus. He was involved in the surveillance of Janice Pottker, a journalist who was writing about the Feld family, and of various animal rights groups such as PETA.

After three years in Baraboo, the clown college operated at the Sarasota Opera House in Sarasota until 1998 before the program was suspended. In February 1999, the circus company started previewing Barnum's Kaleidoscape, a one ring, intimate, upscale circus performed under the tent. Designed to compete with similar upscale circuses such as Cirque du Soleil, Barnum's Kaleidoscape was not successful, and ceased performances after the end of 2000.

Nicole Feld became the first female producer of Ringling Circus in 2004. In 2009, Nicole and Alana Feld co-produced the circus. In 2001, a group led by The Humane Society of the United States sued the circus over alleged mistreatment of elephants. The suit and a countersuit ended in 2014 with the circus winning a total of $25.2 million in settlements. In March 2015, the circus announced that all elephants would be retired in 2018 to the CEC, but Ringling accelerated the decision and retired the elephants in May 2016.

Eight months after it retired the elephants, it was announced in January 2017, that the circus would do 30 more performances, lay off more than 462 employees between March and May 2017 and then close. The circus cited steeply declining ticket sales associated with the loss of the elephants combined with high operating costs as reasons for the closure, along with animal cruelty concerns. On May 7, 2017, its "Circus Extreme" tour was shown for the last time at the Dunkin' Donuts Center in Providence, Rhode Island. The circus's last performance before the hiatus was its "Out of This World" tour at Nassau Veterans Memorial Coliseum in Uniondale, New York on May 21, 2017.

=== 2023 relaunch ===
In October 2021, Feld Entertainment Chairman and CEO Kenneth Feld and COO Juliette Feld Grossman announced that the circus would be relaunched in 2023, without animal performances. In early 2022, the circus began auditioning artists for a retooled circus. More than 1,000 acts applied, and auditions were held in Paris, Las Vegas, Ethiopia, and Mongolia.

In May 2022, Feld Entertainment announced that the circus would resume operations in the fall of 2023 with a tour of 50 cities. The circus said the new show would debut as a "multi-platform entertainment franchise".

On September 29, 2023, after a six-year hiatus, the relaunched circus kicked off at Brookshire Grocery Arena in Bossier City, Louisiana.

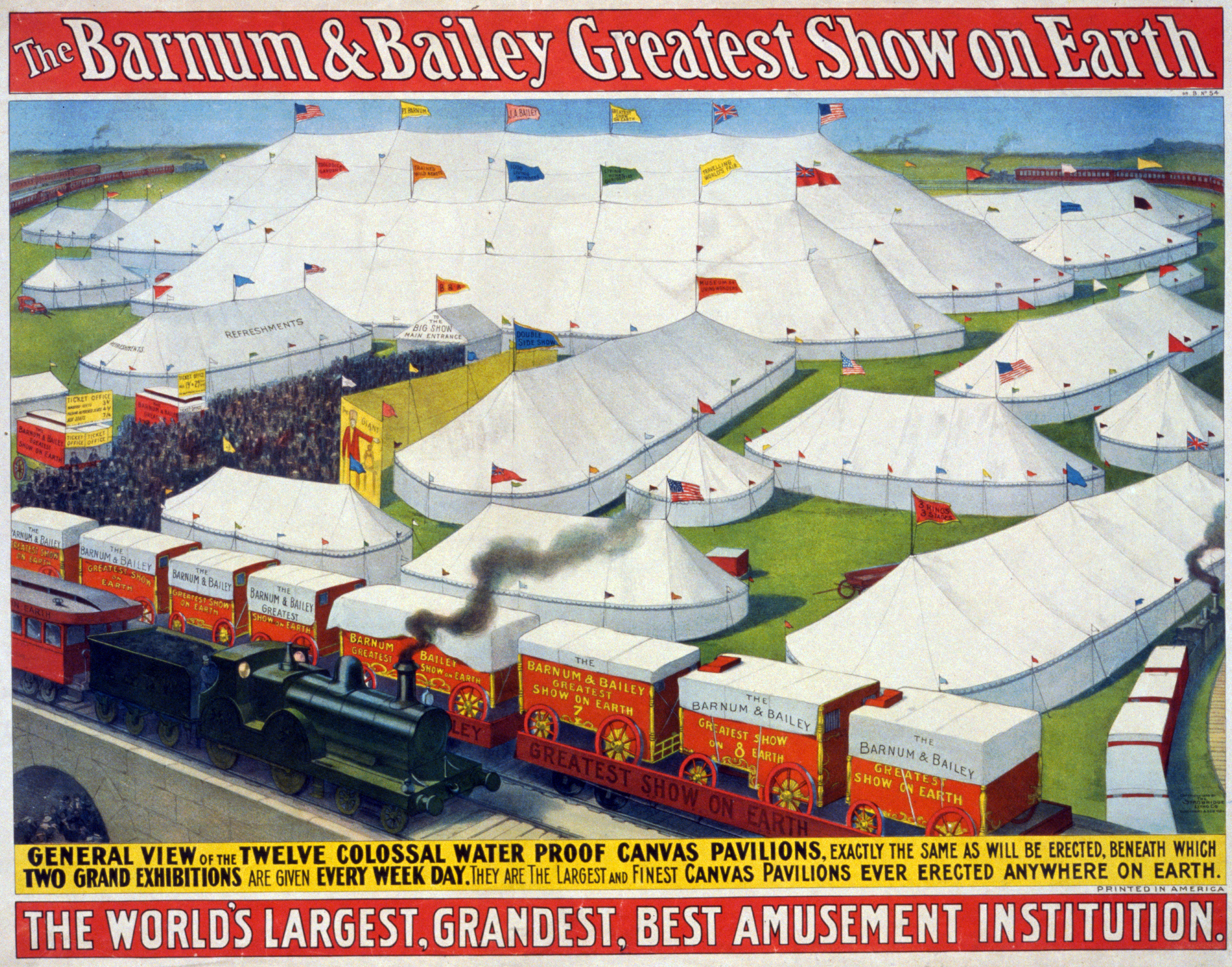
A Barnum & Bailey Greatest Show on Earth poster, 1899

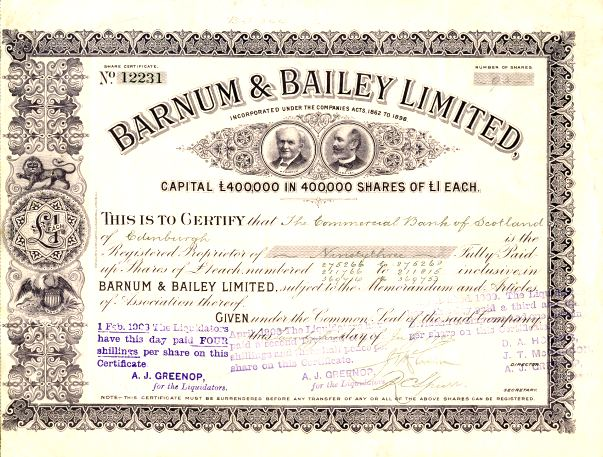
A Stock certificate for Barnum & Bailey, 1903

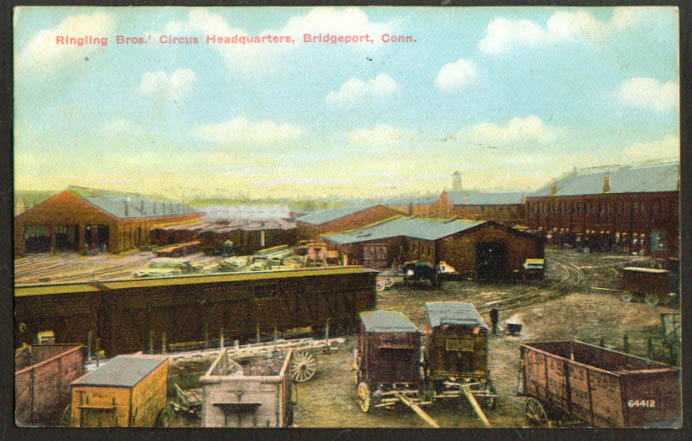
A Ringling bros Postage card, 1911

== Circus trains ==
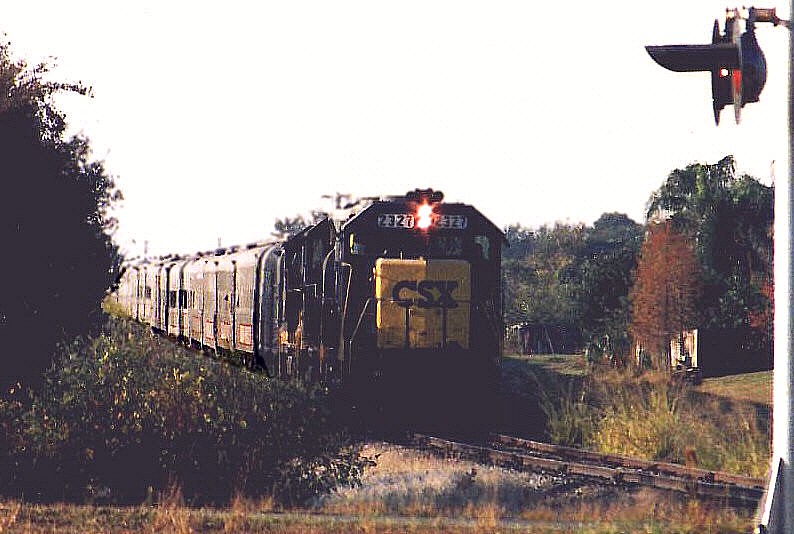
CSX locomotives pulling the circus train out of St. Petersburg, Florida

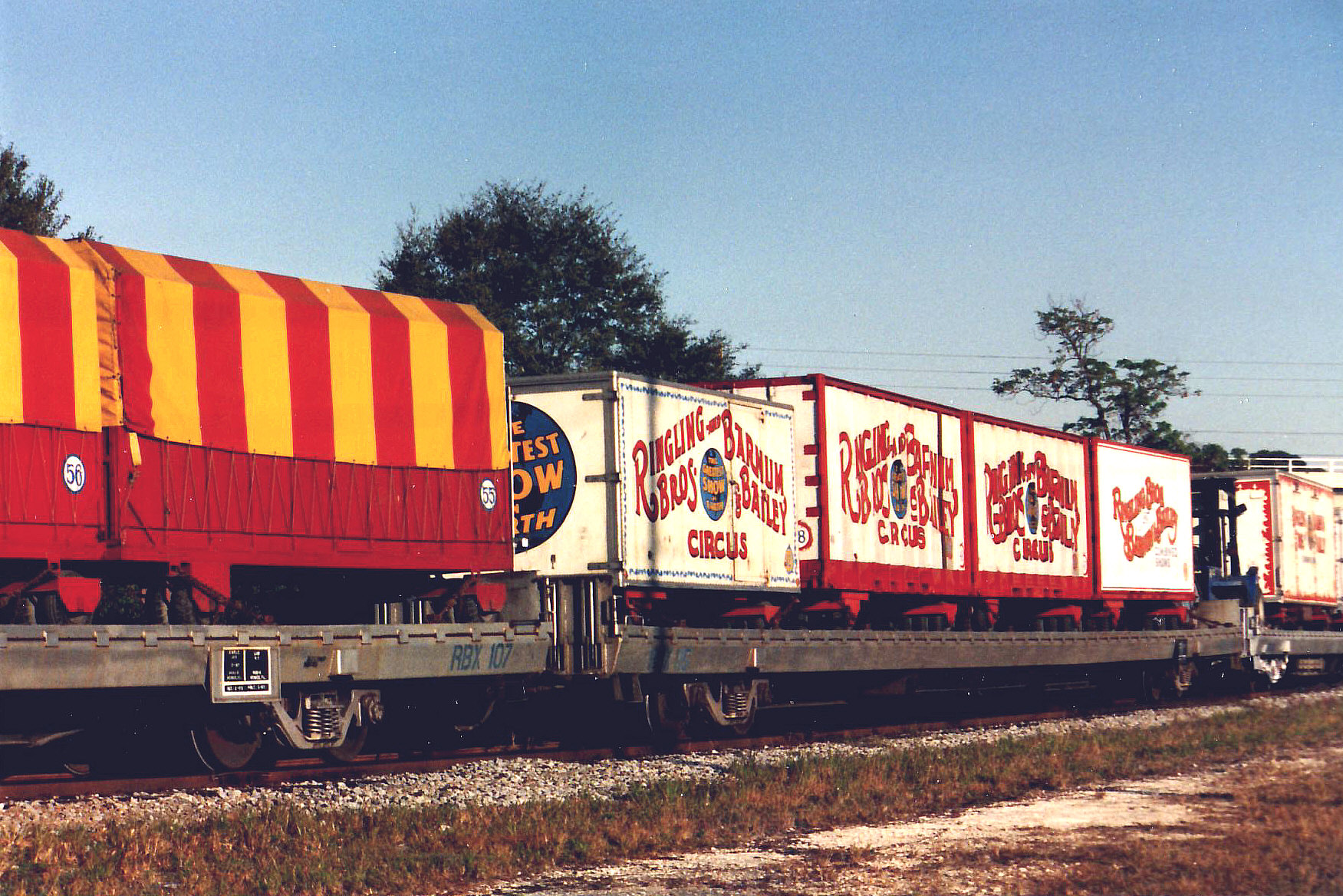
Circus train rolling through Safety Harbor, Florida

The circus maintained two circus train-based shows, one each on its Red Unit and Blue Unit trains. Each train was a mile long with roughly 60 cars: 36 passenger cars, 4 stock cars and 20 freight. Rolling stock belonging to the circus displayed the reporting mark "RBBX". The Blue and Red Tours presented a full three-ring production for two years each, taking off the month of December, visiting alternating major cities each year.

Each train presented a different "edition" of the show, using a numbering scheme that dates back to the circus's origins in 1871 – the first year of P.T. Barnum's show. The Blue Tour presented the even-numbered editions on a two-year tour, beginning each even-numbered year, and the Red Tour presented the odd-numbered editions on the same two-year tour, beginning each odd-numbered year.

In the 1950s, there was one gigantic train system comprising three separate train loads that brought the main show to the big cities. The first train load consisted of 22 cars and had the tents and the workers to set them up. The second section comprised 28 cars and carried the canvasmen, ushers and sideshow workers. The third section had 19 sleeping cars for the performers.

On January 13, 1994, eighteen cars of the circus train derailed while traveling between St. Petersburg and Orlando. Ringling estimated that 150 employees were on board at the time of the accident; fifteen received minor injuries, and clown Ceslee Conkling and elephant trainer Ted Svertesky were killed. The animals were not injured due to the nature of the derailment. The cars carrying the horses and elephants were at the front of the train because otherwise their weight could derail the train, and the other animals were carried at the back of the train. The NTSB's report on the accident concluded that the train derailed due to a fatigue crack in one of the train's wheels.

From 2003 to 2015, the circus also operated a truck-based Gold Tour presenting a scaled-back, single-ring version of the show designed to serve smaller markets deemed incapable of supporting the three-ring versions.

== Animal care and criticism ==
Many animal rights groups have criticized the circus for their treatment of animals over the years, saying that using them to perform is cruel and unnecessary.

In 2004, Ringling Bros. and Barnum & Bailey were investigated following the death of a lion who died from heat and lack of water while the circus train was traveling through the Mojave Desert. In 1998, the United States Department of Agriculture filed charges against Ringling Bros. for forcing a sick elephant to perform. Ringling paid a $20,000 fine.

In 2000, the American Society for the Prevention of Cruelty to Animals (ASPCA) and other animal groups sued the circus, alleging that it violated the Endangered Species Act by its treatment of Asian elephants in its circus. These allegations were based primarily on the testimony of a circus barn worker. After years of litigation and a six-week non-jury trial, the Court dismissed the suit in a written decision in 2009, finding that the barn worker did not have standing to file suit. (ASPCA v. Feld Entm’t, Inc., 677 F. Supp. 2d 55 (D.D.C. 2009)).

Meanwhile, the circus learned during the trial that the animal rights groups had paid the barn worker $190,000 to be a plaintiff in the lawsuit. The circus then sued the animal rights groups under the Racketeer Influenced and Corrupt Organizations Act in 2007, accusing the groups of conspiracy to harm its business and other illegal acts. In December 2012, the ASPCA agreed to pay the circus $9.2 million to settle its part of the lawsuit. The 14-year course of litigation came to an end in May 2014 when The Humane Society of the United States and a number of other animal rights groups paid a $16 million settlement to the circus' parent company, Feld Entertainment.

From 2007 to 2011, the United States Department of Agriculture conducted inspections of the circus's animals, facilities, and records, finding non-compliance with the agency's regulations. The allegations, as brought forth by PETA (People for the Ethical Treatment of Animals) included videotapes of the head elephant trainer and the animal superintendent backstage repeatedly hitting elephants with bullhooks just before the animals would enter the arena for performances. A tiger trainer was videotaped beating tigers during dress rehearsals.

An inspection report alleged that a female Asian elephant, Banko, was forced to perform at a show in Los Angeles despite a diagnosis of sand colic and observations that she appeared to be suffering abdominal discomfort. The inspection reports also cited splintered floors and rusted cages. Following these inspections and complaints filed with the USDA by PETA, the company agreed to pay a $270,000 fine, the largest civil penalty ever assessed against an animal exhibitor under the Animal Welfare Act.

In March 2015, Feld Entertainment announced it would stop using elephants in its shows by 2018, stating that the 13 elephants that were part of its shows would be sent to the circus's Center for Elephant Conservation, which at that time housed over 40 elephants. Feld stated that this action was not a result of the allegations by animal rights groups, but rather due to the patchwork of local laws regarding whether elephants could be used in entertainment shows. Some of those local laws referred to were bans against the use of bullhooks. Subsequently, the retirement was moved up to 2016.

Seven tigers, six lions and one leopard were part of a convoy to temporarily move the animals out of Florida ahead of Hurricane Irma on September 5, 2017. One of them, a 6-year-old Siberian tiger named Suzy who had previously starred in the Ringling Bros. and Barnum & Bailey Circus, escaped from a convoy of trucks transporting her from Florida to Memphis International Airport and was fatally shot by police after attacking a nearby dog.

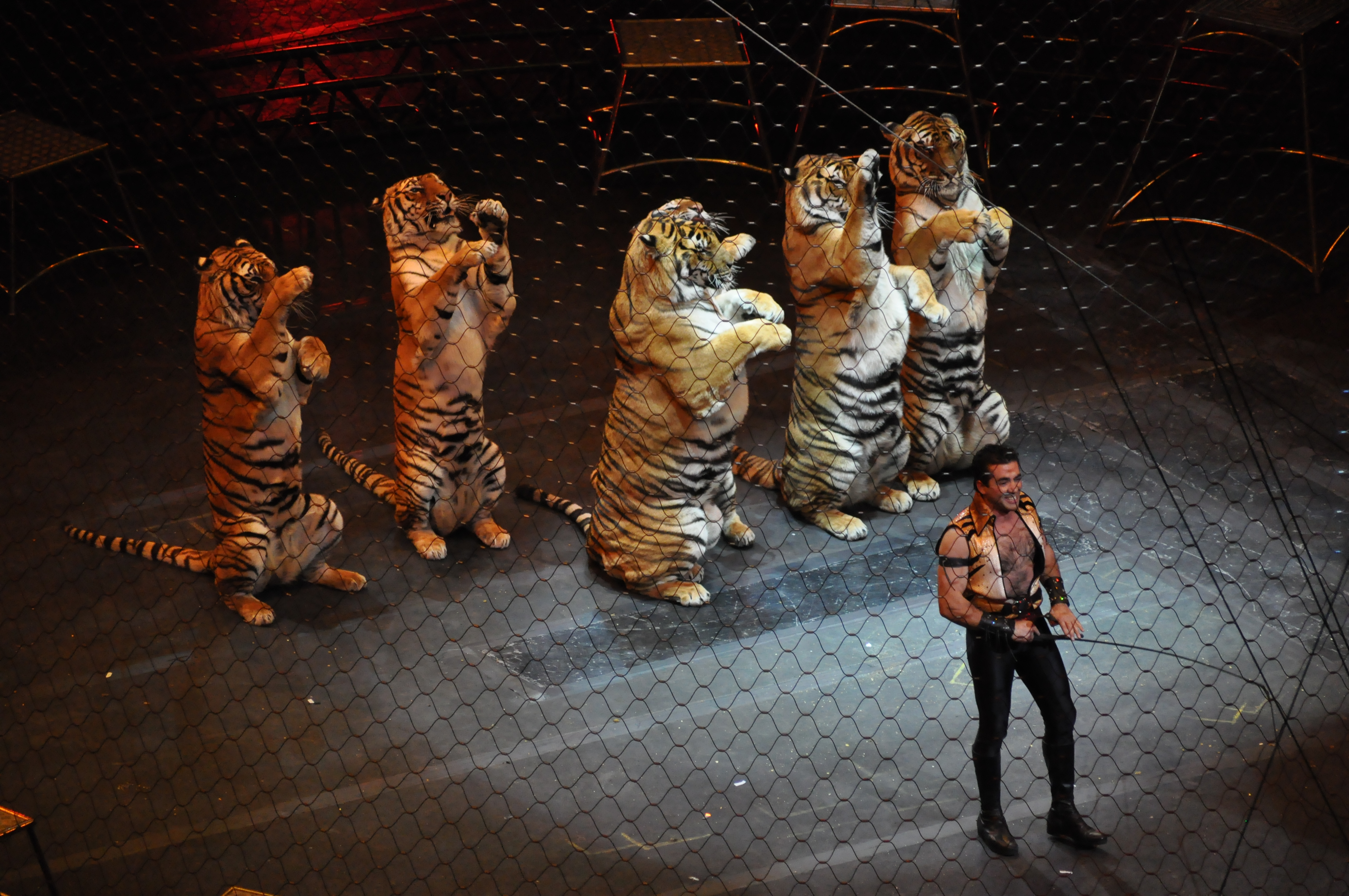
Daniel Raffo and his tigers in "Over the Top"

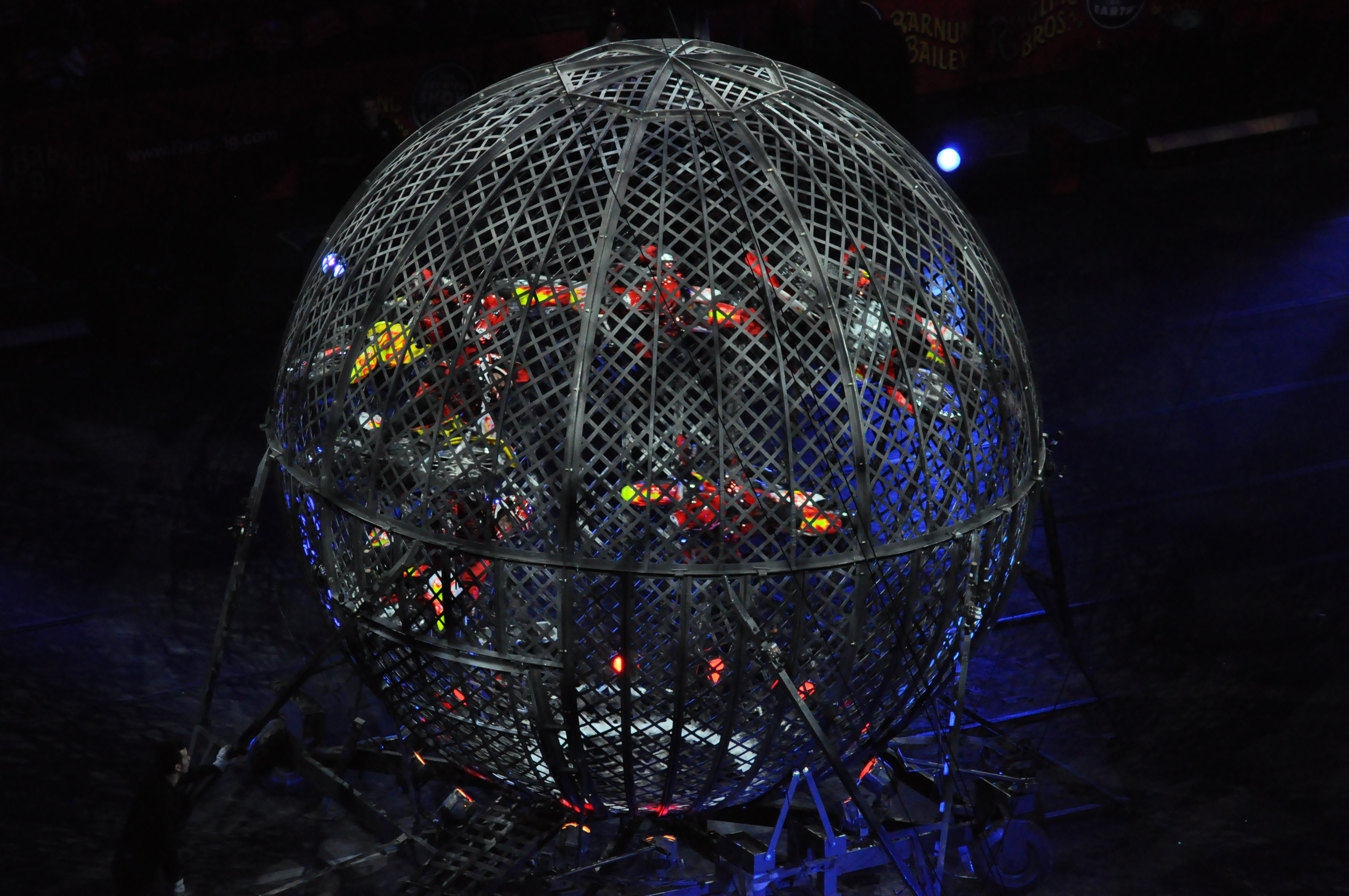
The Torres family performing in "Over the Top"

== Film ==
In 1952, Paramount Pictures released the Cecil B. DeMille production The Greatest Show on Earth, which traced the traveling show through the setup and breakdown of performances during the 1951 season, the show's 81st edition since 1871. The film starred Charlton Heston, Betty Hutton, James Stewart, and Emmett Kelly. After its 1952 release, the film was awarded two Academy Awards, including one for Best Picture. A television series of the same title, was inspired by the film, with Jack Palance in the role of Charlton Heston's character. Produced by Desilu Productions, the program ran on Tuesday evenings for thirty episodes on ABC in 1963–1964.

In August 2011, 20th Century Fox announced that a biographical musical drama film titled The Greatest Showman was in development. Michael Gracey was set to direct, with Jenny Bicks and Bill Condon as writers. Hugh Jackman plays P.T. Barnum, and produced the film, with Michelle Williams portraying Barnum's wife, Charity. Principal photography began in November 2016. The film was released on December 20, 2017.

== See also ==
- William Washington Cole, a Barnum and Bailey business partner
- Barnum and Bailey's Favorite
- John Robinson Circus
