= Center for Elephant Conservation =

Breeding farm and retirement facility

Coordinates: 28.2346°N 81.7642°W

CEC logo

The Center for Elephant Conservation (CEC) was a breeding farm and retirement facility for elephants in Polk City, Florida, operating from 1995-2021. The CEC was solely sponsored by Feld Entertainment, the holding company which operated the Ringling Bros. and Barnum & Bailey Circus from the 1960s until 2017.

== Role and location ==
The CEC was the largest Asian elephant gene pool outside of the Indian subcontinent since traditional zoos usually have, on average, only a handful of elephants. Parent company Feld Entertainment publicized the facility as a gathering place for researchers of elephant behavior and conservation. The center loans both elephants and semen to zoos and cooperative breeding programs around the world. Between the traveling circuses and the center, the herd consists of more than 70 elephants. When the center opened, it was home to 27 elephants, including four studs and six babies. As of 2010, there were a claimed 23 births at the center, most recently a female the staff has named April.

Although the facility was a largely undisturbed natural habitat in which elephants are permitted to graze and stroll, some elephants at the facility were kept confined and chained in cement barns. Photos of the facility and staff training newborn elephants became public after the death of a former Conservation Center employee, Sam Haddock. Outsiders are divided on what the center means for elephants, calling it, alternately, "a stark, sterile-looking place, with … little evident enrichment", "wonderful", "the leading elephant-breeder in the Americas", and an "elephant puppy mill".

In 2014, Feld Entertainment won $25.2 million in settlements from a number of animal-rights groups, including the Humane Society of the United States, ending a 14-year legal battle over unproven allegations that Ringling circus employees mistreated elephants.

The initial lawsuit was filed in 2000 by a former Ringling barn helper who was later found to have been paid at least $190,000 by the animal-rights groups that helped bring the lawsuit. The judge called him "essentially a paid plaintiff" who lacked credibility and standing to sue. The judge rejected the abuse claims following a 2009 trial.

== Health record ==
In 1999, the center failed a USDA inspection under the Animal Welfare Act due to its restraint policy. At least one case of tuberculosis was noted at this time.

An action over these issues was stated in a local court against the Center in June 2000. The action was brought by the American Society for the Prevention of Cruelty to Animals, the Animal Protection Institute, the Animal Welfare Institute, the Fund for Animals, and Tom Rider, a former employee of Ringling Bros. In late 2009, the suit was dismissed by the courts because it was ruled that the plaintiffs, ASPCA et al., as private citizens, were not allowed to bring suit against Feld Entertainment under the Endangered Species Act due to being "uninjured" by the acts in question. Although citizens' right to file suit under the act is stipulated in the act, the court did not allow it.

The court did not rule on the merits of the case, nor the video footage documenting severe hooking of elephants on Ringling show units. Various legal scholars have disputed the legal rigor of this ruling. Ringling Brothers and Barnum & Bailey publicists claim victory and have focused their defense on questioning the motives of whistle-blower Tom Rider and his relationship to animal welfare groups.

In 2003 and 2004, Conservation Center publicists announced that the Center had been given a clean bill of health by USDA inspectors.

In 2006, the Center was quarantined for a case of TB. Only one animal in the herd appears to have been affected.

Ringling Brothers asserts retired circus elephants living at the center have an average lifespan of up to 70 years, although they also list the oldest elephants to die at the facility as 55 and 62 years of age. A number of juvenile elephants have also died in Ringling possession, not at the facility, but while on tour with a Ringling Brothers show. It is likely elephants at Ringling's Florida Center may live longer than captive elephants in zoos, who live an average of 42 years, although not as long as wild elephants who, if protected from poaching, can typically live up to 65 or 70 years.

In 2021, the Center was permanently closed, its remaining elephants having been moved to White Oak Conservation.
