= George Wombwell =

British zoologist

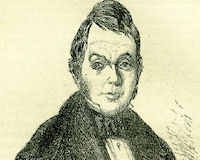
George Wombwell.

George Wombwell (24 December 1777 – 16 November 1850) was a menagerie exhibitor in Regency and early Victorian Britain. He founded Wombwell's Travelling Menagerie.

== Life and work ==
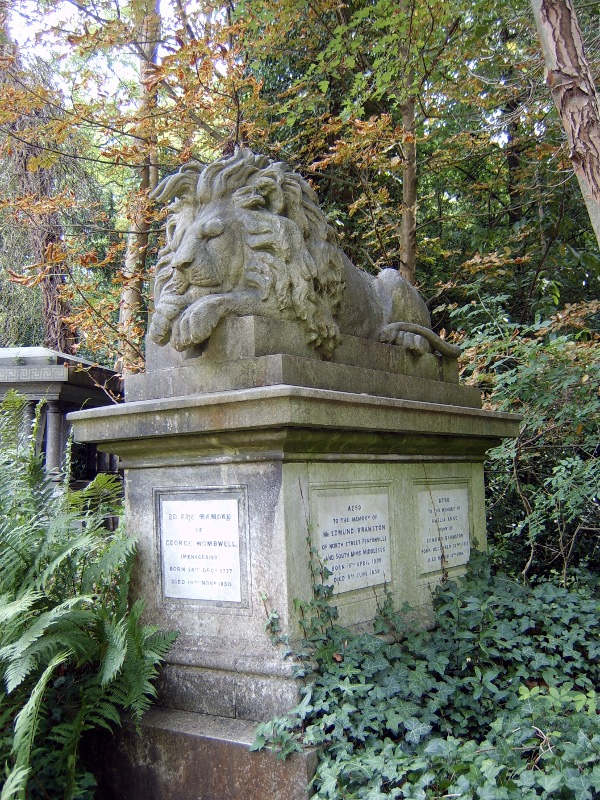
George Wombwell's tomb, Highgate Cemetery

George Wombwell was born at Duddenhoe End, near Saffron Walden, Essex. Around 1800 he moved to London and in 1804 became a shoemaker in Soho. However, when a ship from South America brought two boas to London docks, he bought them for £75 and began to exhibit them in taverns. He soon made a good profit.

Wombwell began to buy exotic animals from ships that came from Africa, Australia and South America, and collected a whole menagerie and put them on display. In 1810 he founded the Wombwell's Travelling Menagerie and began to tour the fairs of Britain. By 1839 it totalled fifteen wagons, and was accompanied by a brass band.

His travelling menagerie included elephants, giraffes, a gorilla, a hyena, kangaroo, leopards, 6 lions, llamas, monkeys, ocelots, onagers, ostriches, panthers, a rhino ("the real unicorn of scripture"), 3 tigers, wildcats and zebras. However, because many of the animals were from hotter climes, many of them died in the British climate. Sometimes Wombwell could profitably sell the body to a taxidermist or a medical school; other times he chose to exhibit the dead animal as a curiosity.

Wombwell bred and raised many animals himself, including the first lion to be bred in captivity in Britain; he named it William in honour of William Wallace. In 1825 Warwick, Wombwell, in collaboration with Sam Wedgbury and dog dealer Ben White's assistant Bill George, arranged a Lion-baiting between his docile lion Nero and six bulldogs. Nero refused to fight but when Wombwell released William, he mauled the dogs and the fight was soon stopped.

Over the years, Wombwell expanded three menageries that traveled around the country. Wombwell was a regular exhibitor at the annual Knott Mill Fair in Manchester, a venue he sometimes shared with Pablo Fanque's circus. He was invited to the royal court on five occasions to exhibit his animals, three times before Queen Victoria. In 1847 the Queen Victoria noted the bravery of the "British Lion Queen", the nickname of Ellen Chapman who appeared with lions, leopards and tigers. Chapman married Wombwell's business rival George Sanger in 1850.

On one occasion Prince Albert summoned him to look at his dogs who kept dying and Wombwell quickly noticed that their water was poisoning them. When the prince asked what he could do in return for this favour, Wombwell said, "What can you give a man who has everything?" However, Wombwell requested some oak timber from the recently salvaged Royal George. From this he had a coffin fashioned for himself, which he then proceeded to exhibit for a special fee.

Wombwell frequented Bartholomew Fair in London and even developed a rivalry with another exhibitor, Atkins. Once when he arrived at the fair, his elephant died and Atkins put up a sign "The Only Live Elephant in the Fair". Wombwell simply put up a scroll with the words "The Only Dead Elephant in the Fair" and explained that seeing a dead elephant was an even a rarer thing than a live one. The public, realising that they could see a living elephant at any time, flocked to see and poke the dead one. Throughout the fair Atkins' menagerie was largely deserted, much to his disgust.

Wombwell maintained strong links with his birthplace in north-west Essex and donated a number of animals from his travelling menageries to what he regarded as his local museum Saffron Walden Museum Among the most notable was the lion Wallace, one of the earliest lions successfully bred in captivity in Britain, which had toured widely with Wombwell’s menagerie before its death in 1838 and was subsequently preserved for museum display. The acquisition of Wallace was recorded by contemporary observers as a major addition to the museum’s early collections, and the specimen remains on public display there. Wallace later achieved wider cultural fame as the inspiration for Stanley Holloway’s comic monologue Albert and the Lion.

George Wombwell died in 1850 and was buried in his Royal George coffin in Highgate Cemetery, under a statue of his lion Nero.

The book George Wombwell (1777 - 1850): Volume One recalls the lion and dog fight in Warwick with well researched evidence, but questions whether it ever actually took place. George Wombwell (1777 - 1850): Volume Two covers Wombwell's life as the most famous showman, from his arrival in London around 1800 to his death in 1850.

== In fiction ==
In the Sherlock Holmes short story The Adventure of the Veiled Lodger the lion tamer, Ronder, is described thus: "Ronder, of course, was a household word. He was the rival of Wombwell".

In Elizabeth Gaskell’s novel Cranford, chapter 12, Miss Matty remembers Wombwell coming to town in her youth, and that she got to see an elephant.

== See also ==
- Lion-baiting
- Joseph Nicholds
