= William C. Coup =

American businessman (1836–1895)

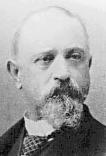
- Born: William Cameron Coup; August 4, 1836; Mount Pleasant, Indiana
- Died: March 4, 1895 (aged 58); Jacksonville, Florida

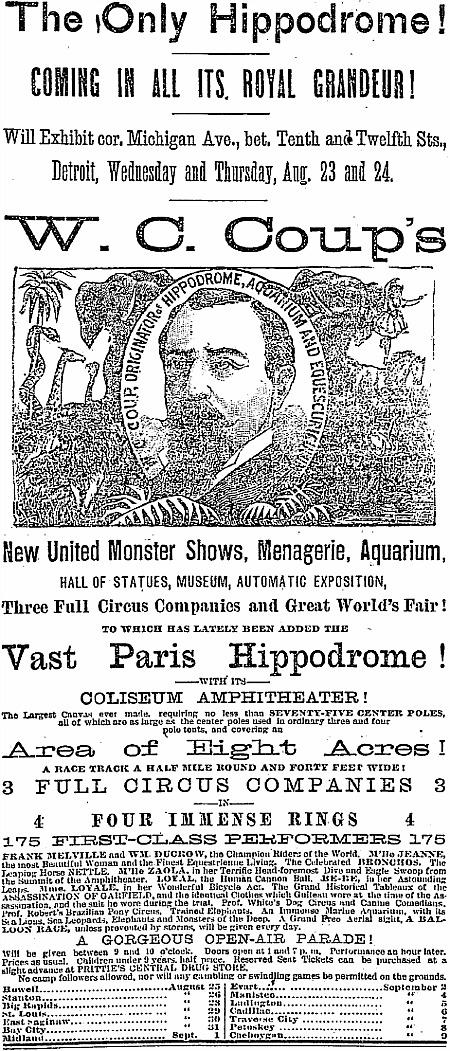

William Cameron Coup (August 4, 1836 – March 4, 1895) was a Wisconsin businessman who partnered with P. T. Barnum and Dan Castello in 1870 to form the "P. T. Barnum's Museum, Menagerie and Circus". Previously, Barnum had a museum at a fixed location in New York City and the traveling circus allowed him to bring his curiosities to more paying customers. Coup's innovations were the circus train to transport the materials from town to town. He also came up with the concept of adding a second ring in 1872 and a third ring to the circus in 1881 to allow more people to view the events.

== Biography ==
He was born in 1837 in Mount Pleasant, Martin County, Indiana. His father purchased a tavern, which was not what William wished to do with his life. He worked in a country newspaper office as a "devil". However, this was not to his liking either. Coup went to see a show and decided to apprentice himself to the show. In 1853, he joined E. F. & J. Mabie Circus, where he secured sideshow privileges. Between 1866 and 1869, he had similar privileges with the Yankee Robinson Circus. He and Dan Castello formed a partnership that had a show travel by boat in 1869, visiting the ports of the Great Lakes. The show was a success.

Dan Castello suggested he work with P. T. Barnum. In 1870, Castello, Coup and Barnum created "P. T. Barnum’s Grand Traveling Museum, Menagerie, Circus and Hippodrome" in New York City. Coup started to use rail transportation for the circus in 1872, against Barnum's judgement.

In 1874, Coup built the New York Hippodrome as a permanent amusement building. This fatigued him, and in 1875 he ended his partnership in the circus and moved to Europe.

In the second quarter of 1876, he returned to the US and formed a new partnership with Charles Reiche to build the New York Aquarium, which opened on October 11, 1876. After a disagreement about opening on Sunday with Reiche, he sold his part at a loss. He then organized "The Equescurriculum" traveling show, which was enlarged yearly until 1879, when it became a consolidated circus as "The New United Monster Shows". In 1883, he established the Chicago Museum in the building then known as McCormick Hall. From 1884 to 1890, Coup was involved with Wild West shows and trained animal exhibitions. He lost most of his equipment in a train wreck near Cairo, Illinois in 1887. He developed a train-based traveling museum called Enchanted Rolling Palaces in 1891.

He died in Jacksonville, Florida on March 4, 1895.

== Circuses ==
- W. C. Coup's Circus (1885–1889)
- W. C. Coup's Rolling Palaces
- Coup's Equescurriculum
- W. C. Coup's New United Monster Shows
- Coup's 10 Consolidated Shows
