= Thomas Jarman =

English composer (1776–1861)

Thomas Jarman (1776–1861) was an English composer, chiefly of hymn tunes.

Jarman was born 21 December 1776 in Clipston, Northamptonshire. His father was a tailor and Baptist lay preacher.

Like his father, Jarman began his career as a tailor. After teaching himself music, Jarman changed career to work as a choir leader and composer, beginning at the local Baptist church. Under his guidance, the choir travelled to nearby locales. Around 1840, Jarman moved to Leamington, Warwickshire, where he was in charge of the music at the local Methodist church, and remained for approximately seven years before returning to Clipston.

From the beginning of the 1800s to 1860, Jarman published 17 collections of songs, hymns, and anthems, including Sacred Music, accounting for over 600 total songs.

Jarman died on 19 February 1861 in Clipston, where he was also buried.
