= Disney Theatrical Group =

Stage production division of Walt Disney Studios

Buena Vista Theatrical Group Ltd.

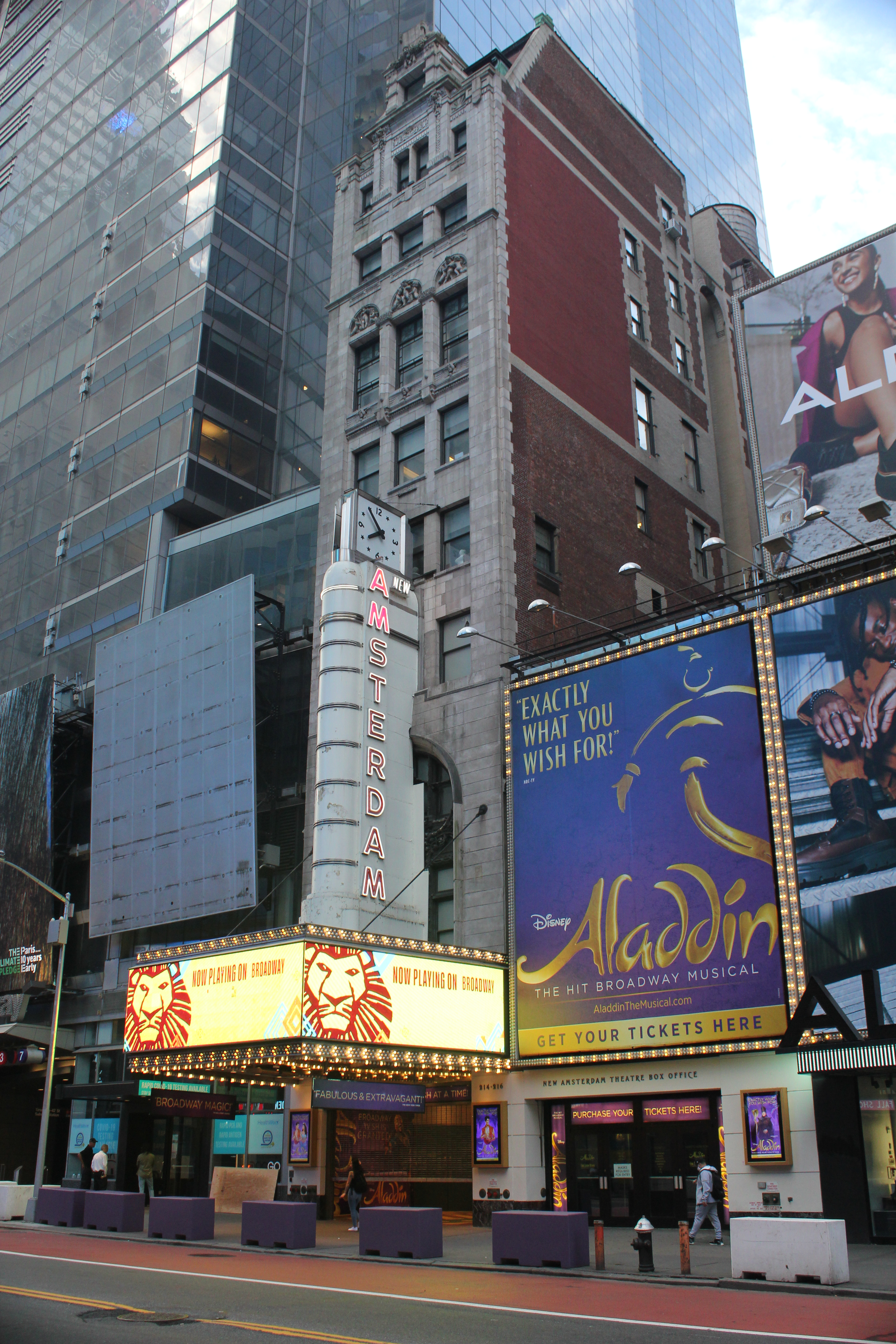
- New Amsterdam Theatre in New York City
- Trade name: Disney Theatrical Group
- Type: Subsidiary
- Industry: Theater
- Founded: November 23, 1999; 26 years ago
- Founders: Peter Schneider; Thomas Schumacher
- Headquarters: New Amsterdam Theatre, New York City, New York, United States of America
- Key people: Anne Quart (Executive Producer); Andrew Flatt (Managing Director)
- Products: Musicals; Plays
- Production output: 24 (2021)
- Brands: Disney on Ice; Disney Live!; Disney on Broadway; Disney on Broadway on Tour
- Services: Licensing
- Revenue: $600 million (2015)
- Parent: Walt Disney Studios
- Divisions: Buena Vista Theatrical Productions; Disney Live Family Entertainment; Disney Theatrical Productions; Disney Theatrical Licensing
- Website: waltdisneystudios.com

Buena Vista Theatrical Group Ltd., doing business as the Disney Theatrical Group, is the live show, stageplay and musical production arm of The Walt Disney Company. The company is led by Thomas Schumacher, Anne Quart, and Andrew Flatt, and is a division of Walt Disney Studios, forming a part of Disney Entertainment, one of the three major business segments of The Walt Disney Company.

== Background ==
Starting in 1949, Ice Capades started adding Disney's segment to their performances. Costumes from those shows were used at the opening of Disneyland in 1955, with some performers hired away for Disney. With the characters a hit at the 1964 New York World's Fair, Walt Disney wanted another outlet for "live" characters. Disneyland put on Disney on Parade, a self-produced live arena show, starting in 1969. After several years, Card Walker shut down the show as it was not making enough profit.

Soon after Mattel/Feld Productions' 1979 purchased the Ice Follies And Holiday on Ice, Inc., Feld approached Disney with a proposal to create a Disney show on ice. Thus Walt Disney's World on Ice premiered in 1981. Disney Studio co-produced "Largely New York" with Kenneth Feld, owner of Feld Entertainment, that premiered on May 1, 1989 at St. James Theatre.

On February 8, 1993, Disney incorporated Walt Disney Theatrical Productions, Limited with Ron Logan as president to produce Beauty and the Beast: A New Musical, which opened at the Palace Theater on April 18, 1994. In 1997, DTP reopened New Amsterdam with King David. Peter Schneider was promoted to Disney Studios president in January 1999, while Thomas Schumacher was promoted to president of Walt Disney Feature Animation and Walt Disney Theatrical Productions while both are made co-presidents of Disney Theatrical.

Walt Disney Imagineering created Disney Fair, a $30-million U.S. traveling attraction that took up 5 acres. The fair started its 15 city 15-month tour at Puyallup, Washington in September 1996. With poor attendance, the fair was pulled after a few stops. Disney Entertainment Projects (Asia Pacific) Inc., a new Disney Asian Pacific subsidiary, selected a renamed fair called DisneyFest as its first project. The 1,000-ton show was transported by ship to Singapore. The festival opened on October 30, 1997 there during the year-end holiday season for a three-month period.

== History ==
=== Buena Vista Theatrical Group ===
Buena Vista Theatrical Group Ltd. was the name of Disney Theatrical Productions as of November 23, 1999 with Disney Theatrical Productions becoming its first division. In January 2000, the formation of the group along with Hyperion Theatricals, Disney's second production division, to oversee Hyperion and Disney Theatrical Productions (DTP) was announced. Hyperion's first production was Aida and all other non-Disney animation based productions were placed under Hyperion. In September 2000, all three US DTG shows, both Hyperion and DTP, were placed under the "Disney on Broadway" banner, then under "Disney on Broadway on Tour" when the shows went on national tour.

Schneider's promotion to studio chair left Schumacher as the only president of DTG in January 2000. Schneider left Disney Studio in June 2001 to form his own theater production company partly funded by Disney. In 2003, Music Theatre International became licensing agent for Disney musicals and plays for the school performances.

=== Disney Theatrical Group ===
After May 2007, Buena Vista Theatrical Group changed its trade name to Disney Theatrical Group. DTG's Disney Live Family Entertainment signed a 10-year agreement with Feld Entertainment for Disney on Ice, Disney Live and other Disney productions in August 2008.

In 2010, Disney Theatrical Group launched its free Disney Musicals in Schools outreach program in New York City. Disney Musicals in Schools allows participating schools to get free performance rights, professional teaching artists and ShowKit materials to one of seven 30-minute Disney musical specifically written for elementary schools. By the end of 2017, the program was available in 18 cities having added 5 more cities, including the first international city London, that year.

On October 31, 2010, the group closed its Glendale, California office and cut staff in a DTG reorganization. In April 2013, Disney Studios initiated a 5% layoffs across all unit including DTG as the Disney conglomerate moves towards a reorganization later in the year. On April 28, 2014, the Group was an honoree at the Actors Fund Annual Gala. Disney India launched its Live Entertainment operations in 2015 with the production of Beauty and the Beast musical to be shown from October to December in Mumbai and Delhi.

No word before or after Disney's acquisition of 21st Century Fox about Fox Stage Productions' status post acquisition. However, the unit's head, executive vice president Cohen, who was also executive vice president of legal affairs, was laid off immediately after the Disney acquisition of 21st Century Fox in March 2019. On July 3, 2019, Fox Stage Productions was moved into Disney Theatrical Group as Buena Vista Theatrical division with all top executives leaving at that time.

In March 2020, The New York Times stated that 'A trade association representing producers and theater owners, said the 41 Broadway houses would remain shuttered at least through June 7'. Which puts the Disney Theatrical Group's Frozen performances on hold until possibly June 2020. On May 14, DTG announced that the Frozen musical would close permanently.

On September 28, 2023, The New York Times published an article noting significant leadership changes in the subsidiary, where Thomas Schumacher now holds the title of Chief Creative Officer, while Anne Quart has become the EVP and Executive Producer, and Andrew Flatt has become the EVP and Managing Director.

== Units ==
- Disney Theatrical Productions is the primary production arm of Disney Theatrical Group. This subsidiary has been responsible for the production of many different Broadway, Off-Broadway, the West End, and regional productions including Beauty and the Beast, The Lion King, The Hunchback of Notre Dame, Mary Poppins, Tarzan, The Little Mermaid, Newsies, Aladdin, Pinocchio, Frozen, Hercules, Winnie the Pooh: The New Musical Adaptation, and The Greatest Showman. The Group also produces touring productions of their shows.
- Disney Theatrical Licensing is DTG's show licensing arm which licenses its shows for performance by local school and community theatres via its agent, Musical Theatre International (MTI). Shows like Beauty and the Beast, Aida, and High School Musical are licensed. Disney also licenses special versions of shows for performance by younger children. Some of these shows include titles like Beauty and the Beast Jr., Aladdin Jr., The Lion King Jr., Mulan Jr., or Mary Poppins Junior. In October 2016, Freaky Friday premiered as a licensed theatrical production in Washington, DC.
- Disney Live Family Entertainment, which incorporates Disney on Ice ice shows and Disney Live, produced by Feld Entertainment.
  - Walt Disney Special Events Group is responsible for live character promotional shows and events.
- New Amsterdam Development Corp.
  - long-term lease of New Amsterdam Theatre
- New Amsterdam Theatrical Productions, Inc.
- Walt Disney Theatrical Worldwide, Inc.
- Buena Vista Theatrical Ventures, Inc.
- Buena Vista Theatrical Merchandise, LLC

=== Buena Vista Theatrical ===
Buena Vista Theatrical, formerly Fox Stage Productions, is a theatrical production company of Disney Theatrical Group.

Previously, 20th Century Fox licensed their property for theatrical adaptations including 9 to 5, Young Frankenstein and Big. In 1970, All About Eve was adapted as Applause musical on Broadway with Margo played by Lauren Bacall. Fox had become vexed by many of these fizzling adaptation attempts.

Fox Stage Productions was formed in June 2013 which included the retaining of Isaac Robert Hurwitz as a consultant. In August 2013, 20CF started a theatrical joint venture with a trio of producer-executives, both film and theater, Broadway producer Kevin McCollum, film producer John Davis and Tom McGrath. McCollum would handle day-to-day operations of the joint venture while The joint venture was Fox contributing 50% and the trio 50%. The trio of individual would do productions outside the venture. The development slate based on Fox films would consist of nine to 12 musicals. Hurwitz was hired in July 2015 as senior vice president of Fox Stage Productions reporting to the division head Bob Cohen.

Fox Stage licensed out Anastasia, both the 1956 feature and the 1997 animated version, to Stage Entertainment, 50 Church Productions, The Shubert Organization, Judith Ann Abrams Productions, Broadway Asia/Umeda Arts Theater, Seoul Broadcasting System, LD Entertainment, Blumegreenspan, Silva Theatrical Group, in association with Hartford Stage for a musical that debut on April 24, 2017, at Broadhurst Theatre on Broadway. A Working Girl musical adaptation with Cyndi Lauper writing the music was announced by Fox in 2017.

No word before or after Disney's acquisition of 21st Century Fox about Fox Stage Productions' status post acquisition. However, the unit's head, executive vice president Cohen, who was also executive vice president of legal affairs, was given a laid off notice after the Disney acquisition of 21st Century Fox in March 2019. On July 3, 2019, Fox Stage Productions was moved into Disney Theatrical Group as Buena Vista Theatrical division with all executives, including Cohen, Connor Brockmeier and SVP Hurwitz, leaving at that time. Instead of a production company on Working Girl, the musical adaptation was switched to a license production by Aged in Wood Productions since Disney took over ownership.

==== Productions ====
- All About Eve (spring 2018) on West End by Sonia Friedman Productions and Fox Stage Productions
- The Diary of a Wimpy Kid (developmental production April 16-June 5, 2016) Children's Theatre Company, Minneapolis
- Mrs. Doubtfire (2021)
- The Devil Wears Prada (musical) produced by Kevin McCollum, Fox Stage Productions and Rocket Entertainment; slated director: Anna D. Shapiro; music by Sir Elton John, lyrics by Shaina Taub and a book by Paul Rudnick
- After Life (summer 2021) by Jack Thorne at the National Theatre in London. The play is based on the Japanese film of the same name by Hirokazu Kore-eda. The play was co-produced by the National Theatre and Headlong with Buena Vista in the Dorfman auditorium.

=== Hyperion Theatricals ===
Hyperion Theatricals was Buena Vista Theatrical Group secondary production division assign all non-Disney animation based productions. Hyperion shared its name with a Disney publishing label, which was named after the Silver Lake street that was Disney's first local address. The new production unit would focus on more traditional Broadway fare.

Hyperion Theatricals was formed in January 2000 along with Buena Vista Theatrical Group Ltd., Disney's theatrical oversight company. Producers and heads of Disney Theatricals Peter Schneider and Thomas Schumacher were assigned to run Hyperion. Hyperion's first production was Aida with the in development Hoopz and all other non-Disney animation based productions were placed under Hyperion. Hoopz, a Harlem Globetrotters based musical by Savion Glover, Reg E. Gaines, and Kenny Leon, was in work shop phase in second quarter 2000.

In September 2000, Aida was placed with Disney Theatrical Productions shows under the "Disney on Broadway" banner, then under "Disney on Broadway on Tour" when the show went on national tour starting April 6, 2001. Hoopz was then hedged as to whether or not it would be released as a Hyperion or Disney Theatrical production.

==== Aida ====
Based on the opera by Giuseppe Verdi, it tells the story of a Nubian slave who falls in love with an Egyptian captain. It was written by Elton John and Tim Rice. It began previews on February 25, 2000, and officially opened on Broadway at the Palace Theatre on March 23, 2000. Aida closed on September 5, 2004, and ran for a total of 30 previews and 1852 performances. The Broadway production won four Tony Awards, including Best Actress (Heather Headley), Best Scenic Design, Best Lighting Design and Best Music. Since its run on Broadway, it has had a U.S. national tour and productions around the world.
