= Bob Menendez =

American politician and criminal (born 1954)

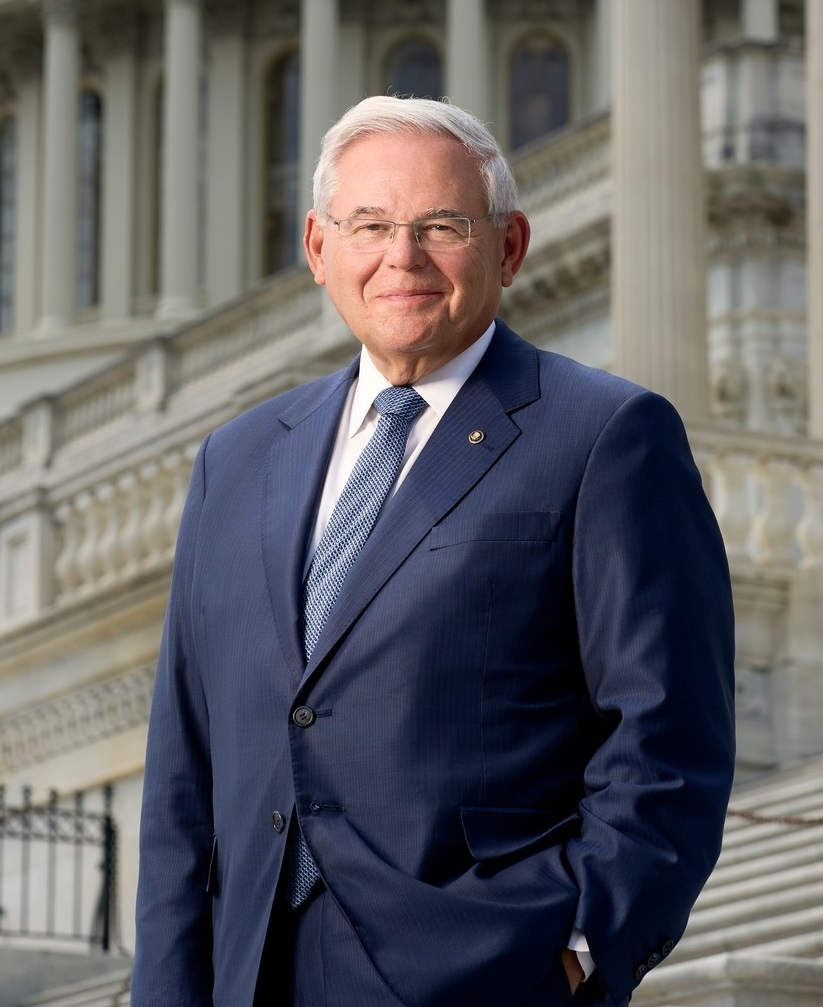
- Official portrait, 2022

United States Senator from New Jersey
- In office January 17, 2006 – August 20, 2024
- Preceded by: Jon Corzine
- Succeeded by: George Helmy
Committee positions
Chair of the Senate Foreign Relations Committee
In office February 3, 2021 – September 22, 2023
Preceded by	Jim Risch
Succeeded by	Ben Cardin
In office February 1, 2013 – January 3, 2015
Preceded by	John Kerry
Succeeded by	Bob Corker
Ranking Member of the Senate Foreign Relations Committee
In office February 6, 2018 – February 3, 2021
Preceded by	Ben Cardin
Succeeded by	Jim Risch
In office January 3, 2015 – April 2, 2015
Preceded by	Bob Corker
Succeeded by	Ben Cardin
Chair of the Democratic Senatorial Campaign Committee
In office January 3, 2009 – January 3, 2011
Leader	Harry Reid
Preceded by	Chuck Schumer
Succeeded by	Patty Murray

Member of the U.S. House of Representatives from New Jersey's 13th district
- In office January 3, 1993 – January 16, 2006
- Preceded by: Frank Joseph Guarini
- Succeeded by: Albio Sires
House positions 1999–2006
Chair of the House Democratic Caucus
In office January 3, 2003 – January 16, 2006
Leader	Nancy Pelosi
Preceded by	Martin Frost
Succeeded by	Jim Clyburn
Vice Chair of the House Democratic Caucus
In office January 3, 1999 – January 3, 2003
Leader	Nancy Pelosi
Preceded by	Barbara B. Kennelly
Succeeded by	Jim Clyburn

Member of the New Jersey Senate from the 33rd district
- In office March 4, 1991 – January 3, 1993
- Preceded by: Christopher Jackman
- Succeeded by: Bernard Kenny

Member of the New Jersey General Assembly from the 33rd district
- In office January 12, 1988 – March 4, 1991
- Preceded by: Jose Arango; Ronald Dario
- Succeeded by: Louis Romano

Mayor of Union City
- In office May 20, 1986 – November 15, 1992
- Preceded by: Arthur Wichert
- Succeeded by: Bruce Walter

Personal details
- Born: Robert Menendez; January 1, 1954 (age 72) New York City, New York, U.S.
- Party: Democratic
- Spouses: Jane Jacobsen (m. 1976; div. 2005); Nadine Arslanian (m. 2020)
- Children: Alicia; Rob
- Education: Saint Peter's University (BA); Rutgers University, Newark (JD)
- Nickname: Gold Bar Bob
- Menendez's voice Menendez on the repeal of the 2002 authorizations for use of military force against Iraq; Recorded March 16, 2023
- Criminal information
- Convictions: Bribery (2 counts); Wire fraud (3 counts); Extortion (3 counts); Obstruction of justice; Being a public official acting as a foreign agent; Conspiracy (7 counts) (Note: Conspiracy to act as a foreign agent; Conspiracy to commit bribery; Conspiracy to commit wire fraud; Conspiracy to commit extortion; Conspiracy to commit obstruction of justice (3 counts))
- Penalty: 11 years in prison

Details
- Date apprehended: September 22, 2023
- Imprisoned at: FCI Allenwood Low

Robert Menendez (/mɛˈnɛndɛz/; born January 1, 1954) is an American former politician and lawyer who represented New Jersey in the United States Senate from 2006 until his resignation in 2024. A member of the Democratic Party, he previously represented New Jersey's 13th congressional district in the United States House of Representatives from 1993 to 2006. His political career ended after he was convicted in a political corruption case in 2024, making him the first sitting member of Congress convicted of conspiracy to act as a foreign agent.

In 1974, Menendez was elected to the Union City School District's Board of Education. He studied political science at Saint Peter's University and graduated from Rutgers Law School. In 1986, he was elected mayor of Union City. While continuing to serve as mayor, he was elected in 1988 to represent the state's 33rd district in the New Jersey General Assembly and moved to the New Jersey Senate in 1991 upon winning the special election for the 33rd Senate district. The next year, Menendez won a seat in the House of Representatives. In January 2006, Menendez was appointed by Governor Jon Corzine to fill his vacated Senate seat. He was elected to a full six-year term in November and reelected in 2012 and 2018. Menendez chaired the United States Senate Committee on Foreign Relations from 2013 to 2015 and from 2021 to 2023.

Menendez was indicted on federal corruption charges in 2015; the jury was unable to reach a verdict, and the charges were dropped in 2018. In 2018, the United States Senate Select Committee on Ethics "severely admonished" Menendez for accepting gifts from donor Salomon Melgen without obtaining committee approval, failing to disclose certain gifts, and using his position as a senator to advance Melgen's interests.

In September 2023, Menendez was again indicted on federal corruption charges that he aided and provided sensitive information to the government of Egypt. The following month, he was charged with conspiracy to act as a foreign agent of the Egyptian government for accepting bribes in exchange for promoting Egypt's opposition to the Grand Ethiopian Renaissance Dam (GERD) on the Blue Nile and for trying to convince the U.S. State Department to adopt Egypt's stance on this issue. A superseding indictment in January 2024 accused Menendez of also working for the government of Qatar. In March 2024, Menendez was indicted for obstruction of justice. In July 2024, a jury found him guilty of all charges. Menendez resigned from the Senate in August 2024 and was sentenced to 11 years imprisonment in January 2025. He has maintained his innocence and vowed to appeal the verdict. As of October 2026, Menendez was incarcerated at the minimum-security federal prison in Allenwood, Pennsylvania (FCI Allenwood Low).

== Early life ==
Menendez was born on January 1, 1954, in New York City to Cuban immigrants who had left Cuba a few months earlier, in 1953. His father, Mario Menéndez, was a carpenter, and his mother, Evangelina, was a seamstress. The family subsequently moved to New Jersey, where he grew up in an apartment in Union City. He attended Union Hill High School, where his speech teacher, Gail Harper, helped him develop as a public speaker. Menendez has said, "My mother and Miss Harper made me understand the power of education, what it means to put a premium on learning and working hard." While at Union Hill, Menendez became the student body president. His father, Mario Menéndez, was reportedly a "compulsive gambler" who died by suicide on June 1, 1978, after deciding not to pay gambling debts.

Menendez became the first in his family to go to college, attending Saint Peter's College in Jersey City, where he was a member of the Lambda Theta Phi fraternity. He graduated with a B.A. in political science and earned his Juris Doctor degree from Rutgers Law School in 1979. Menendez was admitted to the New Jersey bar in 1980 and became a lawyer in private practice.

== Early political career ==
=== Union City politics (1974–1992) ===
At the start of his career, Menendez was an aide to Union City mayor and state senator William V. Musto. In 1974, he was elected to the Union City Board of Education, the youngest candidate ever to win election to the board. In 1982, he unsuccessfully challenged Musto for mayor.

In the 1984 presidential election and 1985 state elections for governor and General Assembly, the Republican Party carried Hudson County, with crucial support from Jersey City mayor Gerald McCann. To build on their gains in the urban, normally Democratic county, Republicans made a significant investment in the 1986 municipal elections. In Union City, Republicans funded an "Alliance Civic Association" (ACA) ticket for city council, led by Republican Assemblyman Ronald Dario. His running mates were two Republicans, Manny Alcobar and Charles Velli, and two Democrats, Menendez and future mayor Bruce Walter.

The ACA swept the council elections with 57% of the vote, beating the reform slate "Transformation '86" and the incumbent "Union City Together" ticket. The Together party, which included Musto's wife, Commissioner Rhyta Musto, represented the remnants of Musto's political machine. Although Republicans had formed and funded the ACA ticket on the premise that the new council would elect Dario mayor, Menendez and Walter convinced Alcobar to switch his vote to Menendez.

=== New Jersey legislature (1987–1992) ===
In November 1987, Menendez was elected to represent New Jersey's 33rd district in the General Assembly. He also continued to serve as mayor until 1992. He held both offices until March 1991, when he moved from the Assembly to the New Jersey Senate upon winning the special election following the death of Christopher Jackman.

== U.S. House of Representatives (1993–2006) ==
=== Elections ===
In 1992, incumbent Democratic U.S. Congressman Frank Guarini, of New Jersey's 14th congressional district, retired after redistricting. The district had been renumbered as the 13th district and reconfigured as a Latino-majority district. Menendez decided to run in the primary—the real contest in this heavily Democratic district—and defeated Robert Haney Jr., 68%–32%. He defeated New Jersey Superior Court Judge Fred J. Theemling Jr. in the general election with 64% of the vote. After that, he was reelected every two years with at least 71% of the vote until he was appointed to the U.S. Senate in January 2006.

=== Tenure ===
Menendez, who was described as very close to Republicans on foreign policy, voted for the failed Kosovo Resolution, authorizing the use of military force against Yugoslavia in the Kosovo War. He was an early advocate of preventing Iran from obtaining nuclear capabilities, sponsoring the Iran Nuclear Proliferation Prevention Act of 1998, which passed the House but failed to pass the Senate.

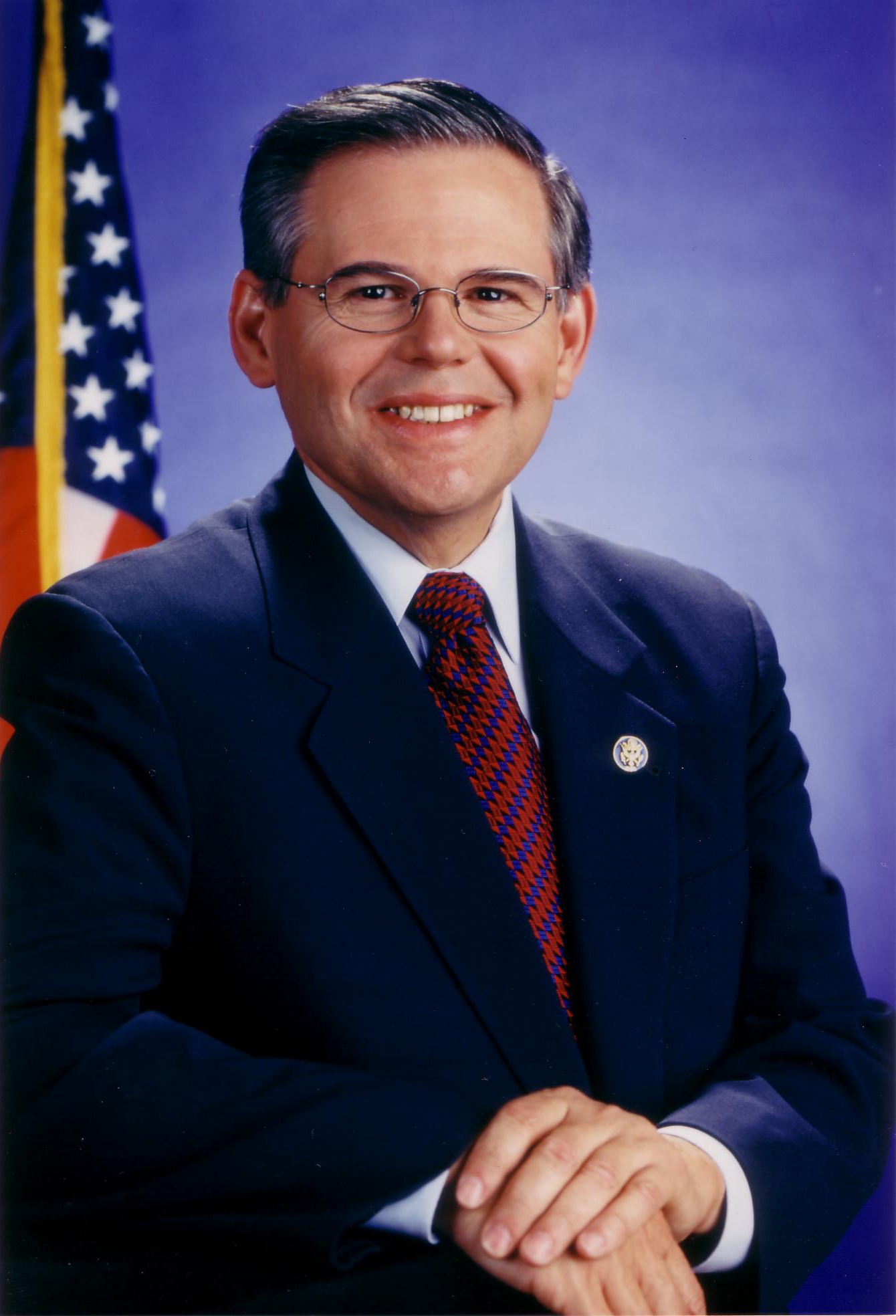
Representative Bob Menendez during the 109th Congress

Menendez voted for Authorization for Use of Military Force Against Terrorists, authorizing the President to use military force in Afghanistan in response to the 9/11 terrorist attacks. In 2002, Menendez voted against the Iraq Resolution to authorize the invasion of Iraq.

Menendez voted against the United Nations Reform Act of 2005, cutting U.S. funding to the U.N. by 50% over three years, and sponsored the Tsunami Orphans and Unaccompanied Children Act of 2005 to assist victims of the 2004 Indian Ocean earthquake and tsunami.

Menendez voted for the PATRIOT Act in 2001, and in 2006 for its reauthorization.

In the 105th Congress, Menendez voted for the Gramm-Leach-Bliley Act, repealing provisions of the Glass-Steagall Act of 1933 that limited investment banks from acquiring insurance companies or other commercial banks, and voted for the Commodity Futures Modernization Act of 2000. After the 2001 Enron scandal, Menendez voted with 333 other House members for the Sarbanes–Oxley Act.

Although he had sometimes been portrayed as the political boss of Hudson County, he strongly dislikes this appellation, particularly because, according to an anonymous close source quoted in the December 11, 2005 Union City Reporter, "there is no boss of Hudson County". According to a 2005 New York Times op-ed, "Since entering politics as a corruption-fighting mayor of Union City, N.J., Mr. Menendez has become a proponent of business as usual. He has long been an entrenched de facto leader of the Hudson County Democratic machine."

In September 2006, just a few weeks before the 2006 Senate elections, the U.S. Attorney's Office in New Jersey, headed by Chris Christie, began investigating a rental deal with North Hudson Community Action Corporation, subpoenaing records from them. Some Democrats criticized the investigation, particularly the timing of the investigation and news leaks, as politically motivated. No charges were brought and the case was closed in 2011 after Christie became the governor of New Jersey.

== U.S. Senate (2006–2024) ==
In January 2006, Governor Jon Corzine appointed Menendez to fill the remaining year in Corzine's Senate term, from which Corzine resigned after being elected governor of New Jersey two months before. While several others had been mentioned, Menendez was the early favorite among pundits for Governor-elect Corzine's choice. Corzine's decision to appoint Menendez got the support of several Latino groups, including the National Association of Latino Elected and Appointed Officials. Menendez was the sixth Latino to serve in the United States Senate.

In 2015, Menendez was ranked No. 1 on The Hudson Reporter's annual Power List of the "Fifty Most Powerful Political Figures in Hudson County".

=== Elections ===
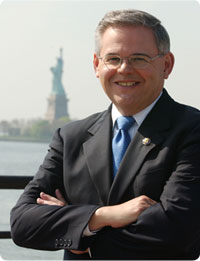
Official portrait, 2013

==== 1996 ====
When incumbent U.S. Senator Bill Bradley decided to retire in August 1995, Menendez made known his intention to run in the 1996 election for the seat, but eventually dropped out of the race and endorsed Robert Torricelli, the Democrat representing New Jersey's 9th congressional district. Similarly, in 1999, when the state's other U.S. Senator, Frank Lautenberg, announced his planned retirement, Menendez again decided not to run, with the Democratic nomination for the 2000 race going to Goldman Sachs CEO Jon Corzine, who won the general election.

==== 2006 ====
In the midterm elections held on November 7, near the end of his one-year appointment, Menendez ran to retain his Senate seat. He defeated Republican Thomas Kean Jr., incumbent minority whip in the New Jersey Senate, and son of former state governor Thomas Kean, with 53% of the vote to Kean's 45%.

Menendez was endorsed by several newspapers including The New York Times, The Philadelphia Inquirer, The Star-Ledger, and The Record.

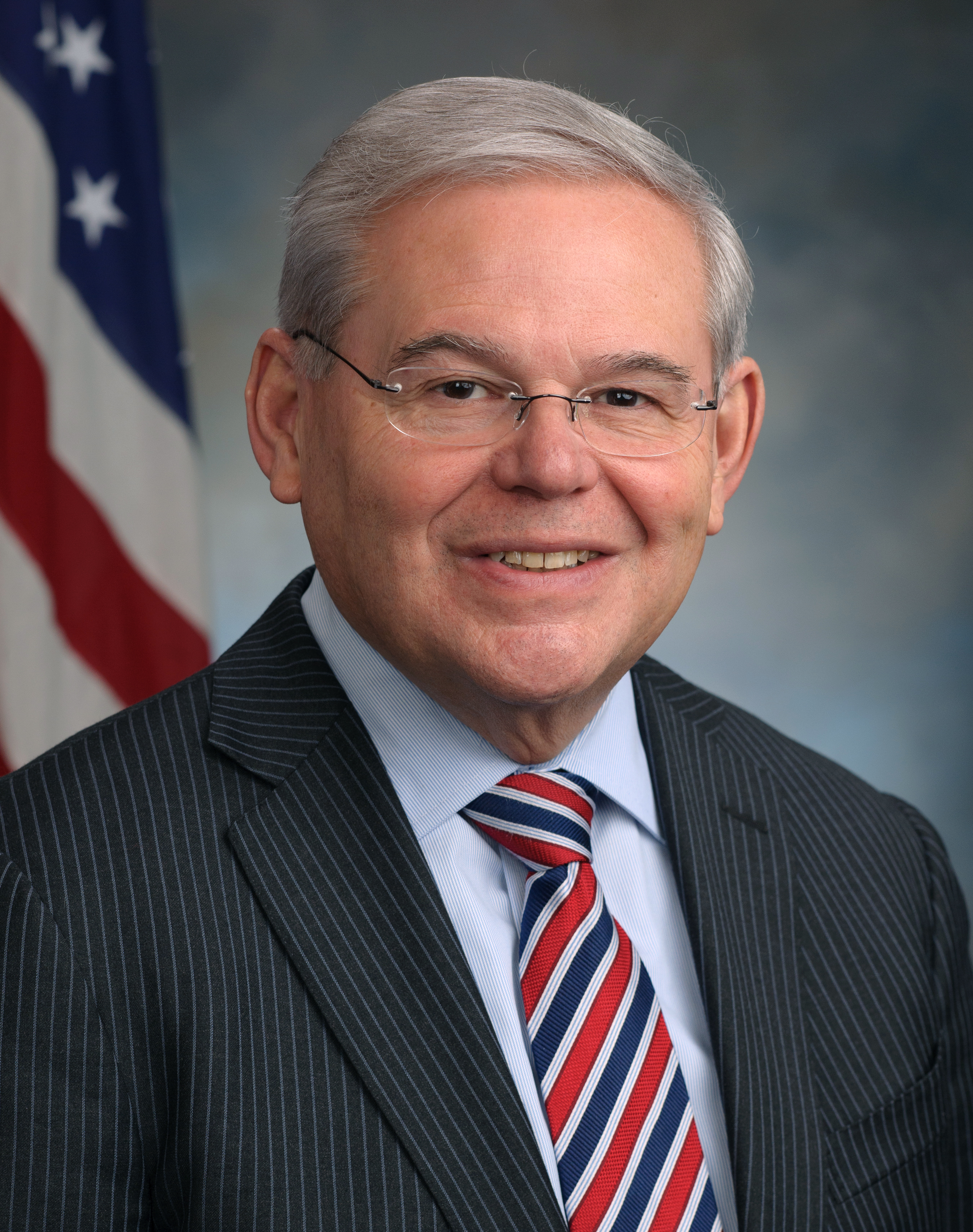
Official portrait, 2015

==== 2012 ====
Menendez ran for reelection to a second full term and defeated Republican Joe Kyrillos on November 6, with 58% of the vote to Kyrillos's 39%.

==== 2018 ====
Menendez ran for reelection to a third full term and defeated Republican Bob Hugin on November 6, with 54% of the vote to Hugin's 42%.

==== 2024 ====
In January 2024, Menendez was charged with corruption for promoting the interests of Qatar while receiving various illicit gifts such as cash, gold bars, and a Mercedes-Benz automobile. On March 21, he announced that he would not run in the Democratic primary due to his indictment on federal corruption charges. He did not rule out running as an independent. On June 3, Menendez officially filed to run as an independent. He told the Associated Press that despite running as an independent he would not leave the Democratic Party. But on July 23, upon his criminal conviction, Menendez announced his resignation from the Senate altogether.

=== Committee assignments ===
As of July 2019, Menendez served on the United States Senate Committee on Banking, Housing, and Urban Affairs; the United States Senate Committee on Finance; and the United States Senate Committee on Foreign Relations.

- Committee on Banking, Housing, and Urban Affairs
- Committee on Finance
- Committee on Foreign Relations (suspended chair)

=== Caucus memberships ===
- Armenian Caucus
- Congressional Autism Caucus
- Senate Taiwan Caucus
- International Conservation Caucus
- Human Rights Caucus
- Narcotics Abuse and Control Caucus
- Friends of the Irish National Caucus
- Afterschool Caucuses
- Congressional Hispanic Caucus

=== Tenure ===
On January 6, 2021, Menendez was participating in the certification of the 2021 United States Electoral College vote count when Trump supporters attacked the U.S. Capitol. After rioters breached the Capitol, he was evacuated to an undisclosed location with other senators. He called the attack "anarchy" and "a sad day for our democracy". After the Capitol was secure and Congress reconvened, Menendez voted to certify the election. Menendez blamed Trump and Republicans who supported Trump's baseless claims of voter fraud for inciting the attack. He also called for an investigation into white supremacy in the military.

==== Immigration ====
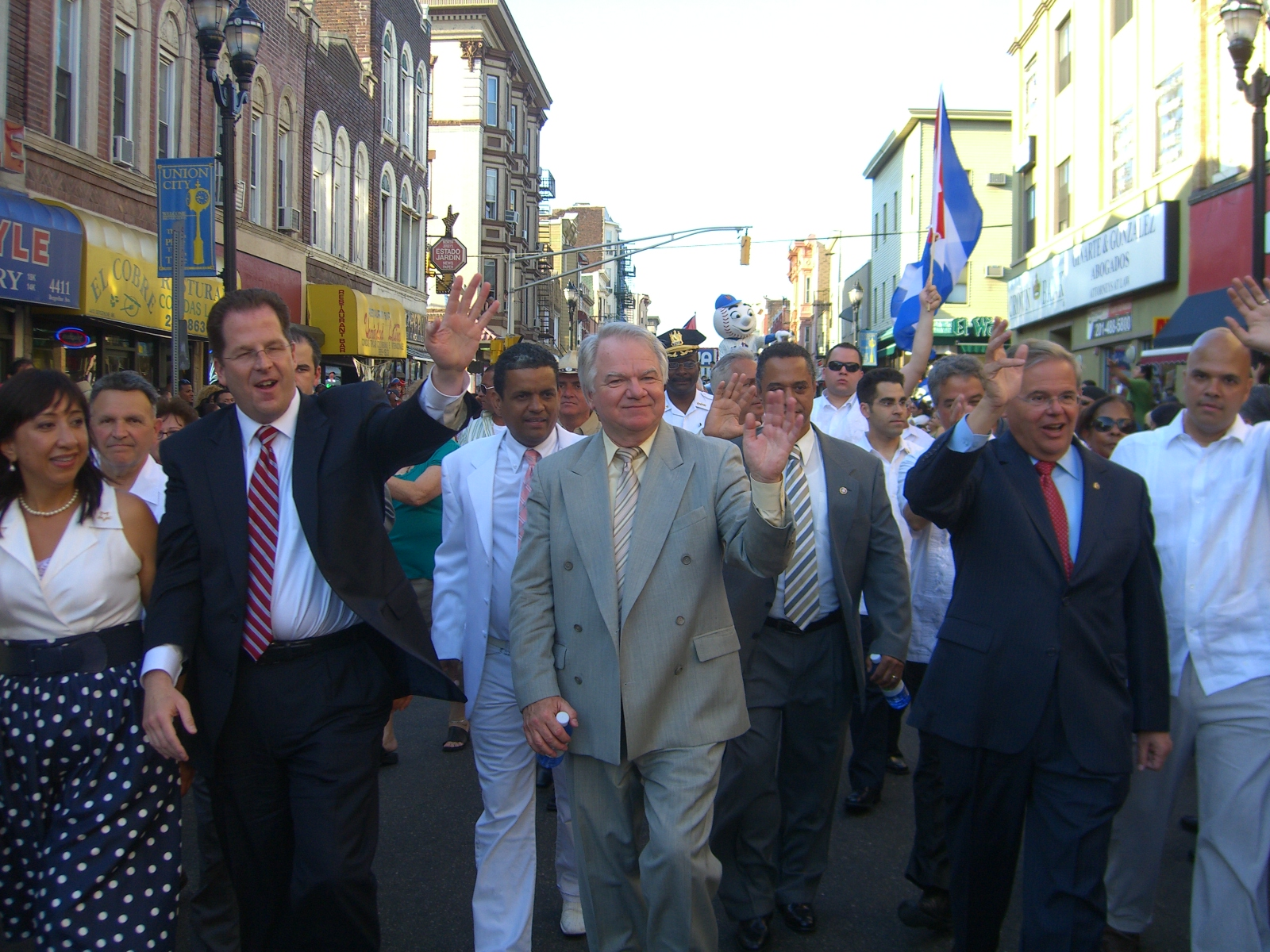
Menendez (second from right) marching in the 2010 North Hudson Cuban Day Parade with Union City Mayor Brian P. Stack (second from left)

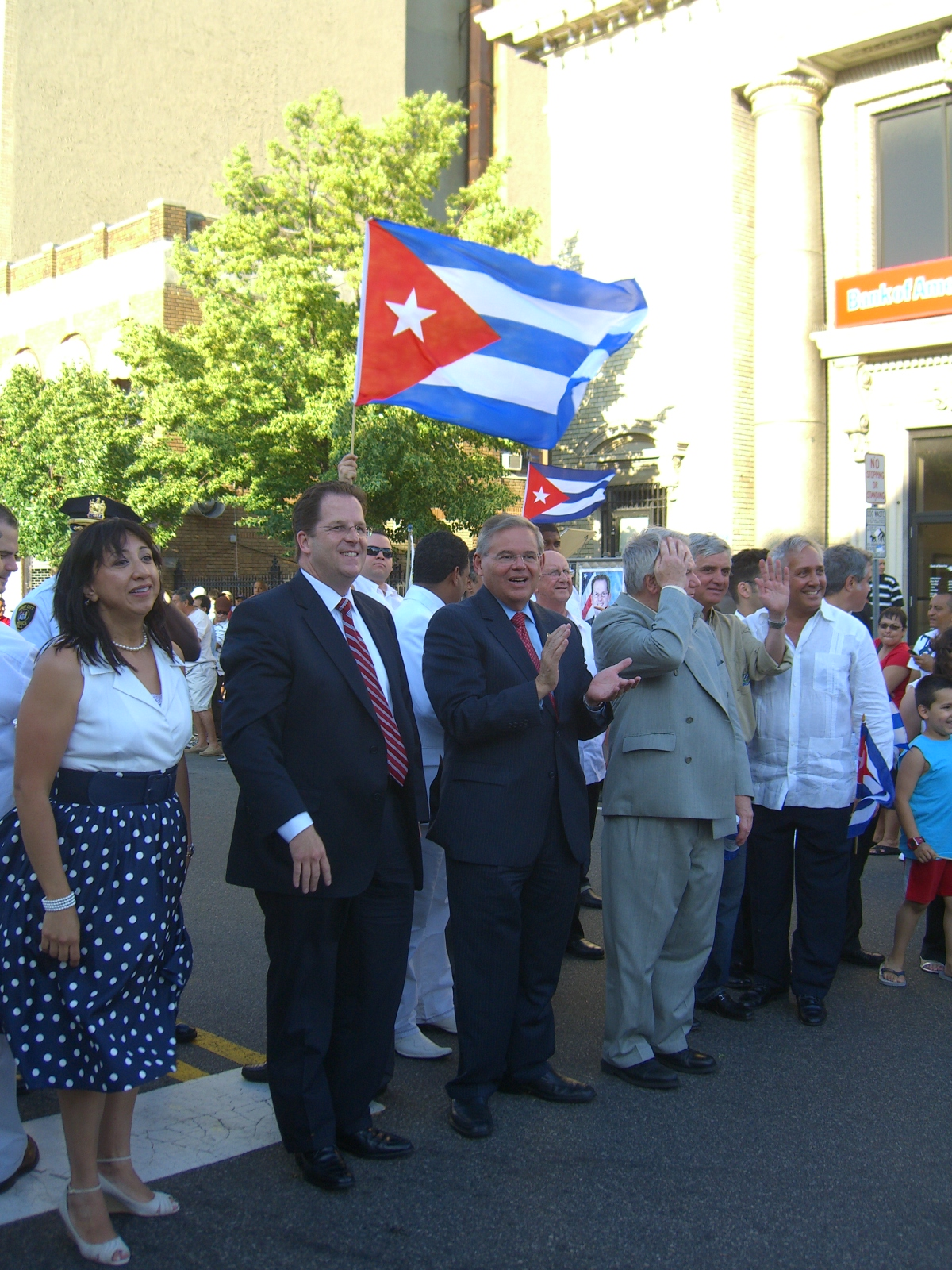
Menendez marching in the 2010 Cuban Day Parade at Union City's northern border with West New York

Menendez is an "aggressive advocate" of immigration reform, calling it the "civil rights issue of our time". He has introduced multiple pieces of legislation in attempts to overhaul what he calls our "failed immigration system". Menendez introduced the Comprehensive Immigration Reform Act of 2011, but it died in the Senate Judiciary Committee. In 2009, he introduced the Orphans, Widows, and Widowers Protection Act, granting a pathway to citizenship for the undocumented widowers and orphans of deceased U.S. citizens.

Menendez is a strong supporter of the DREAM Act, saying, "Children should not be punished for the actions of their parents. These kids have grown up as Americans, worked hard in school and now they want to serve our country in the military or pursue a college education. This is the only home many of them have known and they should be encouraged to pursue the American dream." He voted for the DREAM Act in 2007 and was a cosponsor along with 31 other senators in the Act's failed passage in 2010.

Menendez voted against denying legal status to illegal immigrants convicted of domestic violence, crimes against children and crimes relating to the illegal purchase or sale of firearms, but voted to establish a six-month to 20-year ban for undocumented immigrants seeking citizenship who had been convicted for the same crimes along with obstruction of justice, human trafficking and the participation of criminal gang activity.

Menendez supported the Comprehensive Immigration Reform Act of 2006 and Comprehensive Immigration Reform Act of 2007, voting for both bills. He voted against Senate Amendment 1151, declaring English the national language of the Federal government of the United States. He voted to continue federal funding for declared "sanctuary cities".

He voted for the Secure Fence Act of 2006, building 700 miles (1,100 km) of physical barriers and expanding surveillance at the Mexico–U.S. border, and supported Senate Amendment 4775, which would have appropriated $1.8 billion for the construction of 370 miles (600 km) of triple-layered fencing, and 461 miles (742 km) of vehicle barriers along parts of the Southwest.

On January 28, 2013, Menendez was a member of a bipartisan group of eight senators that announced principles for comprehensive immigration reform (CIR). In 2014 the National Council of La Raza (America's largest Latino advocacy organization) recognized Menendez for his work in supporting immigration reform as a member of the "Gang of Eight".

==== Agriculture ====
In June 2019, Menendez and 18 other Democratic senators sent USDA Inspector General Phyllis K. Fong a letter requesting that she investigate USDA instances of retaliation and political decision-making and asserted that not conducting an investigation would mean these "actions could be perceived as a part of this administration's broader pattern of not only discounting the value of federal employees, but suppressing, undermining, discounting, and wholesale ignoring scientific data produced by their own qualified scientists".

==== Disaster relief ====
In April 2018, Menendez was one of five Democratic senators to sign a letter to FEMA administrator Brock Long calling on FEMA to enter an agreement with the United States Department of Housing and Urban Development that would "stand up the Disaster Housing Assistance Program and address the medium- and longer-term housing needs" of evacuees of Puerto Rico in the aftermath of Hurricane Maria. The senators asserted that "FEMA's refusal to use the tools at its disposal, including DHAP, to help these survivors is puzzling – and profoundly troubling" and that hundreds of hurricane survivors were susceptible to being left homeless in the event that FEMA and HUD continued not to work together.

==== Environment ====
Menendez introduced legislation that would incentivize the conversion of vehicles to run on natural gas; the bill did not make it out of committee in its first incarnation and failed to receive 60 votes required to pass in 2012.

In February 2019, in response to reports of the EPA intending to decide against setting drinking water limits for perfluorooctane sulfonic acid (PFOS) and perfluorooctanoic acid (PFOA) as part of an upcoming national strategy to manage the aforementioned class of chemicals, Menendez was one of 20 senators to sign a letter to Acting EPA Administrator Andrew R. Wheeler calling on the agency "to develop enforceable federal drinking water standards for PFOA and PFOS, as well as institute immediate actions to protect the public from contamination from additional per- and polyfluoroalkyl substances (PFAS)".

In June 2019, Menendez was one of 44 senators to introduce the International Climate Accountability Act, legislation that would prevent President Trump from using funds in an attempt to withdraw from the Paris Agreement and directing the Trump administration to develop instead a strategic plan for the United States that would allow it to meet its commitment under the Paris Agreement.

==== Education ====
Menendez sponsored the Student Non-Discrimination Act, expanding Title IX of the Education Amendments Act to LGBT students, and the Safe Schools Improvement Act of 2011, which would also amend the Higher Education Act of 1965. He voted for the Matthew Shepard and James Byrd Jr. Hate Crimes Prevention Act in 2009, saying, "When someone is harassed, assaulted or killed simply because of the type of person they are, it's a crime against an entire community and our nation's values." In 2012, Menendez received a 94% rating from the Human Rights Campaign.

During a press conference about the Teachers and First Responders Back to Work Act, Menendez claimed that New Jersey was facing a $10.5 billion shortfall in its 2012 fiscal budget that would lead to cuts in state spending on education. PolitiFact rated this statement "false" because the 2012 budget was balanced and increased education funding.

==== LGBT policy ====
Menendez voted for the Defense of Marriage Act (DOMA) as a congressman in 1996; on December 18, 2011, he came out in support of, and co-sponsored, the Respect for Marriage Act, which would repeal DOMA. Menendez also voted for the U.S. military's Don't ask, don't tell as a congressman, and co-sponsored the DADT repeal act in 2010.

In 1999, Menendez voted against a proposed amendment that would have banned adoption in Washington D.C. by same-sex couples and other persons not related by blood or marriage. The amendment failed with 213 votes in favor and 215 votes against.

Of gay rights, Menendez has said, "Two people who want to be committed to each other should be able to enter into marriage, and they should receive the benefits that flow from that commitment."

==== Gun policy ====
Menendez has an "F" rating from the NRA Political Victory Fund and a "F−" rating from the Gun Owners of America due to his support of gun law reform. Specifically, he supports universal background checks and a ban on assault weapons.

In January 2019, Menendez was one of 40 senators to introduce the Background Check Expansion Act, a bill that would require background checks for either the sale or transfer of all firearms, including all unlicensed sellers. Exceptions to the bill's background check requirement included transfers between members of law enforcement, loaning firearms for either hunting or sporting events on a temporary basis, providing firearms as gifts to members of one's immediate family, firearms transferred as part of an inheritance, or giving a firearm to another person temporarily for immediate self-defense.

In June 2019, Menendez was one of four senators to cosponsor the Help Empower Americans to Respond (HEAR) Act, legislation that would ban suppressors being imported, sold, made, sent elsewhere, or possessed and grant a silencer buyback program as well as include certain exceptions for current and former law enforcement personnel and others. The bill was intended to respond to the Virginia Beach shooting, where the perpetrator used a .45-caliber handgun with multiple extended magazines and a suppressor.

==== Health care ====
In December 2018, Menendez was one of 42 senators to sign a letter to Trump administration officials Alex Azar, Seema Verma, and Steve Mnuchin arguing that the administration was improperly using Section 1332 of the Affordable Care Act to authorize states to "increase health care costs for millions of consumers while weakening protections for individuals with pre-existing conditions". The senators requested the administration withdraw the policy and "re-engage with stakeholders, states, and Congress".

In January 2019, during the 2018–2019 United States federal government shutdown, Menendez was one of 34 senators to sign a letter to Commissioner of Food and Drugs Scott Gottlieb recognizing the efforts of the FDA to address the effect of the government shutdown on the public health and employees while remaining alarmed "that the continued shutdown will result in increasingly harmful effects on the agency's employees and the safety and security of the nation's food and medical products".

==== Foreign affairs ====
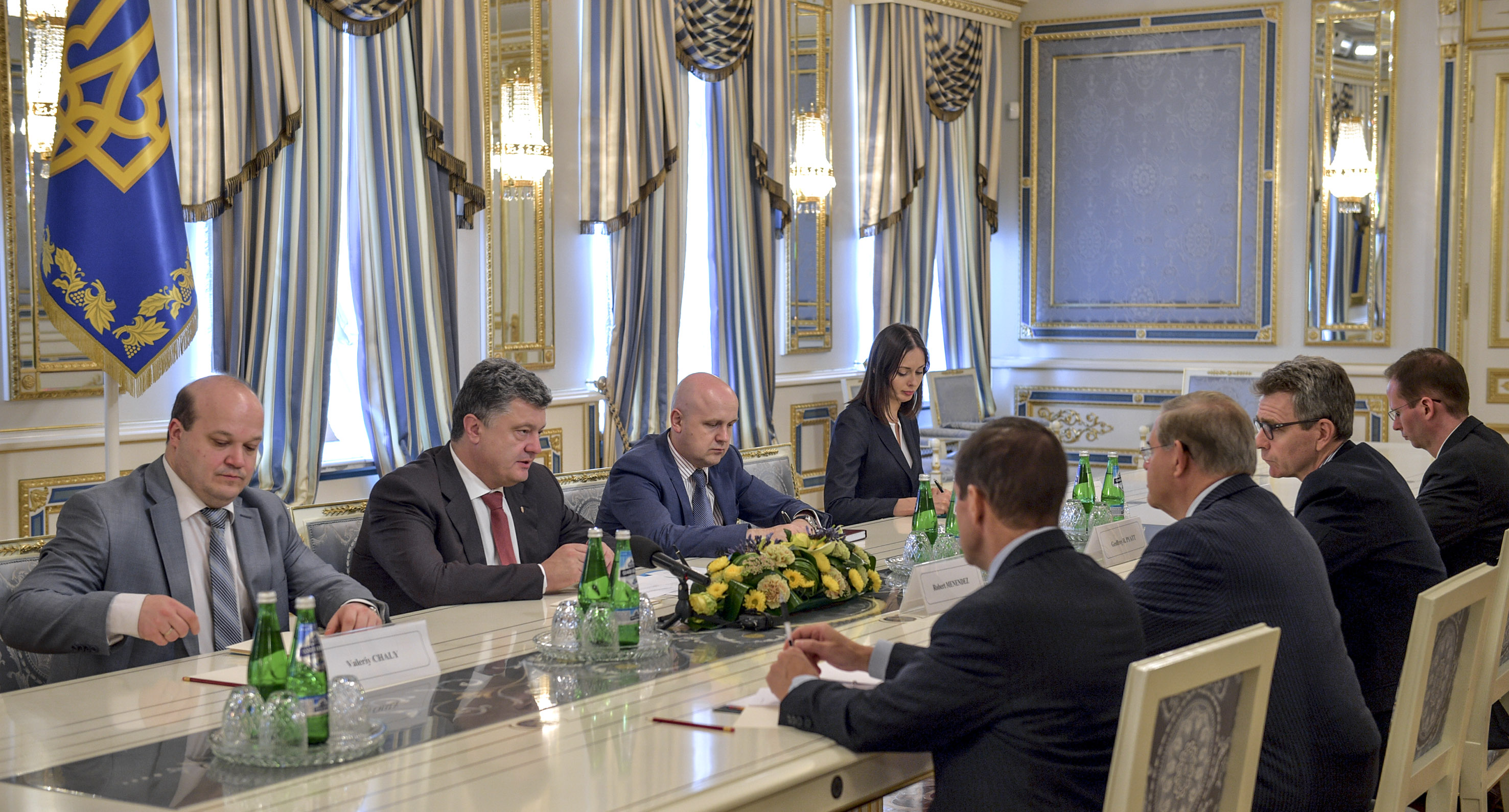
Menendez with Ukrainian President Petro Poroshenko, Kyiv, Ukraine, September 2014

Menendez holds that the success of America's foreign policy is "inextricably linked to the health of her domestic democracy", stating in the January 19, 2021, confirmation hearings of Secretary-designate Antony Blinken that public servants and senators have a "duty to stand up for democracy, for the constitution, and for the rule of law". He identified chief concerns as "rebuilding alliances, restoring American leadership in international institutions, and addressing complex global challenges like climate change, migration, pandemics like COVID-19". He identifies the "core American values" as "democracy, human rights, and the rule of law", upon which foreign policy should be recentered.

In February 2006, Menendez cosponsored legislation with Senator Hillary Clinton to make it illegal for foreign governments to buy U.S. port operations. The legislation was a direct response to Dubai Ports World's efforts to purchase Peninsular and Oriental Steam Navigation Company (P&O) of the United Kingdom, which operates six major U.S. ports. Menendez said, "Our ports are the front lines of the war on terrorism. They are both vulnerable targets for attack and venues for smuggling and human trafficking. We wouldn't turn the Border Patrol or the Customs Service over to a foreign government, and we can't afford to turn our ports over to one either."

Former undercover FBI agent Robert Eringer wrote in his 2008 book Ruse: Undercover with FBI Counterintelligence that Cuban diplomats approached him to infiltrate Cuban exile organizations. He said that the Cuban government believed Menendez and Representatives Ileana Ros-Lehtinen and Lincoln Díaz-Balart were receiving illicit payments from such organizations, and that it wanted to identify the source of the payments in order to "expose and humiliate" the three Congress members.

In October 2009, Menendez sent a strongly worded letter of protest to Cyprus President Dimitris Christofias, criticizing him for his praise of the Cuban government. Christofias, the leader of AKEL, Cyprus's communist party, from 1988 to 2009 and president from 2008 to 2013, had paid a state visit to Cuba in September 2009 for the opening of Cyprus's new embassy and, in his speech, made several anti-American embargo references, and spoke of the "common struggle of Cyprus and Cuba". In his letter to Christofias, Menendez wrote, "you cannot claim human rights violations by Turkey in your country and then ignore such violations in Cuba. Second, you cannot call for property rights for Greek Cypriots and then deny them on Cuba. Finally, you cannot take issue with the militarization of northern Cyprus and then ignore the state security apparatus that oppresses the Cuban people."

In December 2010, Menendez voted for the ratification of New Start, a nuclear arms reduction treaty between the U.S. and the Russian Federation obliging both countries to have no more than 1,550 strategic warheads or 700 launchers deployed during the next seven years along with providing a continuation of on-site inspections that halted when START I expired the previous year. It was the first arms treaty with Russia in eight years.

On August 18, 2015, Menendez announced his opposition to the nuclear deal with Iran, saying, "President Obama continues to erroneously say that this agreement permanently stops Iran from having a nuclear bomb, Let's be clear: What the agreement does is to recommit Iran not to pursue a nuclear bomb, a promise they have already violated in the past."

In March 2017, Menendez co-sponsored the Israel Anti-Boycott Act (S.270), which made it a federal crime, punishable by a maximum sentence of 20 years imprisonment, for Americans to encourage or participate in boycotts against Israel and Israeli settlements in the occupied Palestinian territories if protesting actions by the Israeli government.

In 2018, Menendez urged Vice President Mike Pence to enter talks with Ecuador about withdrawing its asylum for Julian Assange. His letter, signed by nine other senators, alleged that it was Assange's goal to "undermine democratic processes globally". In March 2018, Menendez voted against Bernie Sanders's and Chris Murphy's resolution that would end U.S. support for the Saudi Arabian-led intervention in Yemen. But Menendez criticized Saudi Arabia's war in Yemen, saying, "The Saudi Coalition bears significant responsibility for the magnitude of human suffering and scale of destruction in Yemen. Seventy-five percent of the population is in need of humanitarian assistance and more than 8 million are on the brink of famine." Noting concerns with the language after voting for Bob Corker's resolution naming the Saudi crown prince "responsible" for the murder of Jamal Khashoggi, he said, "regardless of all of my other concerns about language is the central essence of what the chairman is going to do. I think it's incredibly important for the Senate to speak on that issue and hopefully speak with one voice."

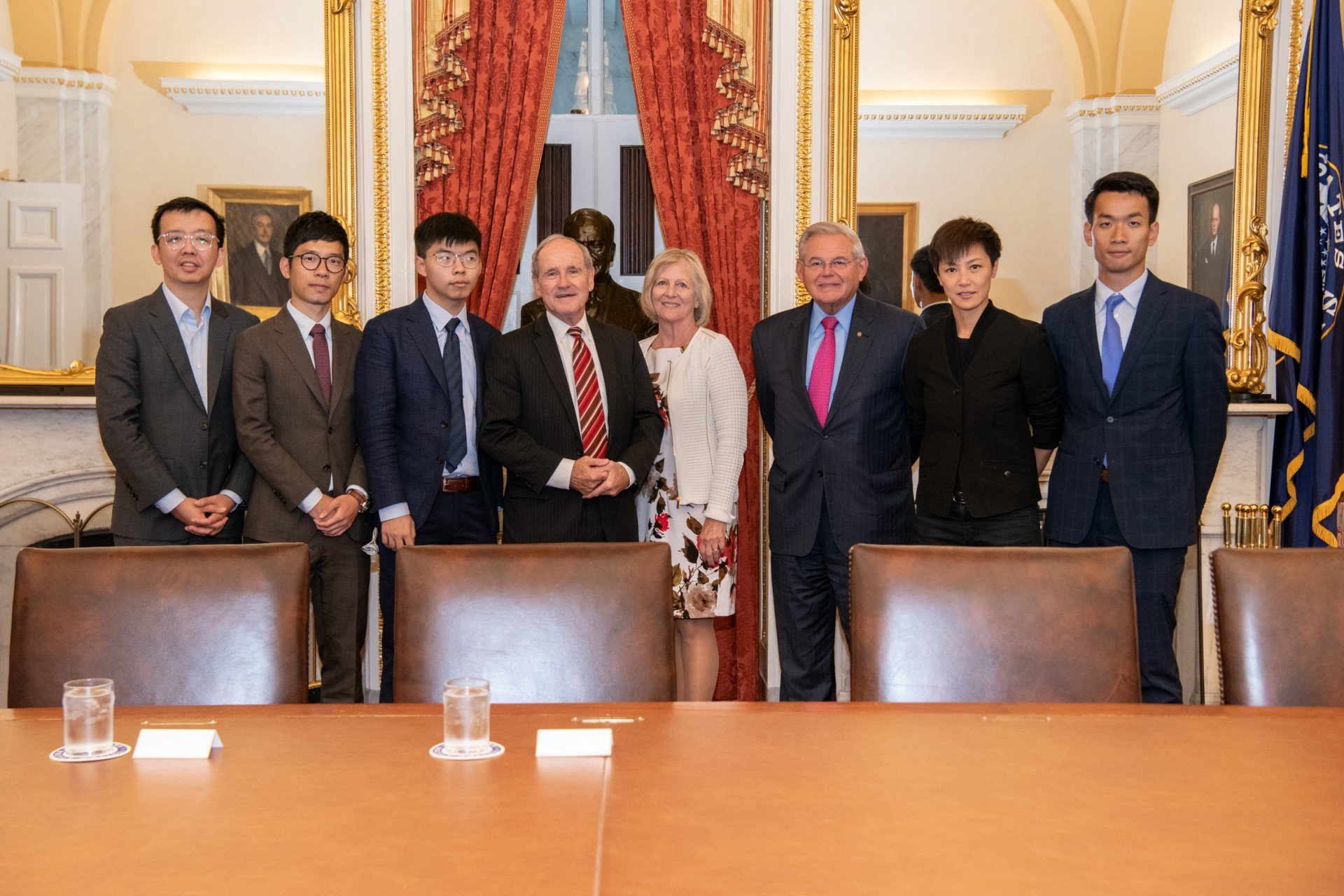
Menendez with Hong Kong activists who became prominent figures in the 2019–2020 Hong Kong protests

Menendez condemned the genocide of the Rohingya Muslim minority in Myanmar and called for a stronger response to the crisis.

Menendez raised the issue of Xinjiang re-education camps and called China's persecution of Uyghurs "beyond abhorrent", adding, "The President needs to have a clear and consistent approach to China, and not turn a blind eye as a million Muslims are unjustly imprisoned and forced into labor camps by an autocratic regime."

In January 2019, Menendez opposed Trump's planned withdrawal of U.S. troops from Syria and Afghanistan as a threat to U.S. national security.

In April 2019, Menendez was one of 34 senators to sign a letter to Trump encouraging him "to listen to members of your own Administration and reverse a decision that will damage our national security and aggravate conditions inside Central America", asserting that Trump had "consistently expressed a flawed understanding of U.S. foreign assistance" since becoming president and that he was "personally undermining efforts to promote U.S. national security and economic prosperity" by preventing the use of Fiscal Year 2018 national security funding. The senators argued that foreign assistance to Central American countries created less migration to the U.S. by helping to improve conditions in those countries.

In June 2019, Menendez called for the immediate release of Ukrainian journalist Stanislav Aseyev, who was being held in custody by militants from the so-called Donetsk People's Republic.

In October 2019, Menendez stated his opposition to the Turkish invasion of the Kurdish areas in Syria.

Menendez called for the Trump administration to immediately suspend U.S. military aid to Azerbaijan, sent through Pentagon's "building partner assistance program". According to critics, the aid could be used in the Nagorno-Karabakh conflict between Azerbaijan and Armenia. In September 2020, Menendez tweeted: "I strongly condemn Azerbaijan's attack on Nagorno Karabakh, yet another act of aggression supported by Turkey." He co-signed a letter stating: "We have been very critical of U.S. security assistance to Azerbaijan given the country's human rights record and aggression in the region. Earlier this year, at Senator Menendez's request, the Government Accountability Office agreed to conduct a review of security assistance to the country to ensure that it aligns with U.S. interests; this violence indicates that it does not."

In September 2022, during a Senate Foreign Relations Committee hearing, Menendez criticized the Biden administration for hesitating to impose sanctions on the governments of Sudan and Ethiopia, where many atrocities and war crimes were committed in the Tigray War.

==== Senate Foreign Relations Committee ====
Menendez became chair of the Foreign Relations Committee after John Kerry's confirmation as Secretary of State in January 2013. His "Syria force resolution" was praised by President Obama and others. Menendez has supported taking a "hard line" on Iran.

==== Foreign affairs legislation sponsored ====
- Organization of American States Revitalization and Reform Act of 2013 (S. 793; 113th Congress) – Menendez introduced this bill on April 24, 2013. The bill would require the Secretary of State to develop a multiyear strategy to bolster the Organization of American States (OAS) and improve the OAS's processes for managing its budget and personnel. The act would require the Secretary to provide quarterly briefings to Congress on the progress of implementing that strategy.
- Support for United States-Republic of Korea Civil Nuclear Cooperation Act – Menendez introduced this bill, which would authorize the President to extend the term of the "Agreement for Cooperation between the Government of the United States of America and the Government of the Republic of Korea Concerning Civil Uses of Atomic Energy" to a date no later than March 19, 2016. The bill passed the Senate on January 27, 2014, and the House on January 28, 2014.
- Ukraine Freedom Support Act of 2014 (S. 2828), was introduced by Menendez to the 113th Congress on September 16, 2014, to address pro-Russian unrest in Ukraine. It was co-sponsored by 14 other senators. President Obama signed the bill into law on December 18, 2014.
- Defending Ukraine Sovereignty Act of 2022. In light of the prelude to the 2022 Russian invasion of Ukraine, this legislation gave Ukraine $500 million "to assist the country in meeting its defense needs". The bill also reimposed sanctions on Russia.

==== Other issues ====
On September 28, 2006, Menendez voted for the Military Commissions Act.

On June 12, 2007, Menendez endorsed Hillary Clinton for president and was given the position of National Campaign Co-chair. He made numerous media appearances in support of her campaign.

In 2009, Menendez succeeded Senator Chuck Schumer of New York as chair of the Democratic Senatorial Campaign Committee. Menendez's tenure, which followed two straight election cycles of dramatic Democratic gains, was marked by a more troubled Democratic outlook. Critics of Menendez pointed out the surprising Democratic loss in the 2010 Massachusetts Senate special election that followed the death of Ted Kennedy; Menendez's lower-key, more cautious management style; and problems caused by retirements in Indiana and elsewhere. Others, such as Schumer, defended Menendez's performance, citing the negative political climate.

A group of New Jersey citizens launched an effort to recall Menendez in early 2010. Although Article 1, Paragraph 2(b) of the New Jersey Constitution expressly authorizes such a recall, state officials fought the effort in court. On March 16, 2010, a State Appeals court ruled that the recall petition could proceed. Menendez said he was surprised that a group claiming to be true to the Constitution was trying, in his words, "to undermine it". He appealed the ruling. Legal experts have debated the constitutionality of a state recall of a federal officeholder. On November 18, 2010, the New Jersey Supreme Court found that the New Jersey provision violated the U.S. Constitution.

In 2010, The Wall Street Journal reported that Menendez had written to Federal Reserve Chairman Ben Bernanke, asking him to approve an acquisition that would rescue from the prospect of receivership a New Jersey bank, First Bank Americano, operated by Menendez donors. It was discovered that "eight of 15 directors, including the bank's chairman and vice-chairman, have been contributors to Menendez or his political action committee". Former federal bank regulator William K. Black called the letter "grotesquely inappropriate" and said that "the letter crossed an unofficial line by asking regulators to approve an application instead of simply asking that it be given consideration". An aide to Menendez said that political contributions did not influence his decision to write the letter. A highly critical Federal Deposit Insurance Corporation report found that the institution had engaged in unsafe or unsound banking practices, including operating without adequate supervision by its board of directors, excessive delinquent or bad loans, inadequate earnings, and insufficient coverage of its assets.

On January 5, 2012, Menendez blocked Judge Patty Shwartz, an Obama administration nominee, to a federal judgeship, drawing speculation that the block was placed because of Shwartz's relationship with the head of the public corruption unit for New Jersey's federal prosecutor, who had investigated Menendez during his 2006 campaign. Menendez denied personal motivation for the block. He has long contended that the corruption investigation was politically motivated. The investigation was closed in late 2011 with no charges filed.

On December 12, 2012, it was reported that Menendez's office had an unpaid intern volunteering who had let his visitor visa expire and was a registered sex offender. The Bureau of Immigration and Customs Enforcement had been aware of the man as early as October 2012 but according to the Associated Press, the U.S. Department of Homeland Security (DHS) instructed their agents not to arrest the man until after Election Day. Menendez denied knowing about the allegation of the directive to delay the arrest and only recently learned of the arrest. According to two federal officials who spoke anonymously because they were not authorized to discuss the case, the intern was arrested in front of his New Jersey home on December 6, 2012.

In May 2014, Menendez received an award for Political Courage at a gala organized by the American Friends of Likud, where he reaffirmed the strong alliance between the U.S. and Israel and said, "several thousands of years of history lead to an undeniable conclusion: the reestablishment of the State of Israel in modern times is a political reality with roots going back to the time of Abraham and Sarah and historical texts and artifacts". He rejected movements to boycott Israel.

Menendez became an outspoken advocate of the People's Mujahedin of Iran (MEK) after it was delisted.

Menendez spearheaded a nonbinding resolution in July 2018 "warning President Trump not to let the Russian government question diplomats and other officials". The resolution states the United States "should refuse to make available any current or former diplomat, civil servant, political appointee, law enforcement official or member of the Armed Forces of the United States for questioning by the government of Vladimir Putin". It passed 98–0.

In April 2019, Menendez was one of 41 senators to sign a bipartisan letter to the housing subcommittee praising the United States Department of Housing and Urban Development's Section 4 Capacity Building program as authorizing "HUD to partner with national nonprofit community development organizations to provide education, training, and financial support to local community development corporations (CDCs) across the country" and expressing disappointment that Trump's budget "has slated this program for elimination after decades of successful economic and community development." The senators hoped the subcommittee would support continued funding for Section 4 in Fiscal Year 2020.

Menendez has pushed for a complete tax deduction for state and local taxes (SALT). Most of the benefits of such a policy would benefit the wealthiest taxpayers.

=== Implication in child prostitution scandal ===
In November 2012, the conservative political news and opinion website Daily Caller published allegations that Menendez had contact with underage prostitutes in the Dominican Republic. The allegations were promoted by Republican Party operatives, who arranged for ABC News and the Daily Caller to interview two women who accused Menendez of patronizing prostitutes. ABC News and other news organizations such as The New York Times and the New York Post declined to publish the allegations, viewing them as unsubstantiated and lacking credibility. One accuser stated that she had been paid to falsely implicate Menendez and had never met him. The Daily Caller said this woman was not interviewed for its story. Menendez's office called the allegations "manufactured" by a "right-wing blog" as a politically motivated smear. On March 18, 2013, Dominican police announced that three women had said they had been paid $300–$425 each to lie about having had sex with Menendez.

== Corruption charges and conviction ==
=== 2006 ethics complaint ===
On August 27, 2006, two Republican state lawmakers filed an ethics complaint against Menendez, alleging he broke conflict-of-interest rules when renting property to a nonprofit agency that receives federal funds. Menendez helped the agency win designation as a Federally Qualified Health Center in 1998. That designation allowed it to receive additional federal grants. Menendez allies said that the organization in question, the North Hudson Community Action Corp., which provides social services and health care to the poor and was founded in 1960, had received federal funding for years before Menendez was in Congress, and receives its funding based on mathematical formulas. Menendez said that he rented the property out below market value because "he was supportive of its work". The total rent collected over nine years was over $300,000.

=== 2015 indictment ===
External videos
- Q&A interview with former U.S. attorney Randall Eliason on the Menendez indictment and trial, September 17, 2017, C-SPAN

In January 2013, Federal Bureau of Investigation (FBI) agents raided the office of Florida ophthalmologist Salomon Melgen, a close friend and major donor to Menendez. Later that month, a federal grand jury in Miami began investigating Menendez for his role in advocating for Melgen's business interests. It was revealed over the following months that Menendez had paid Melgen nearly $59,000 for two private flights to the Dominican Republic in 2010. This raised questions about whether the flights violated Senate Ethics Committee rules. It was also found that Melgen's company had contributed more than $950,000 to Menendez's 2012 reelection campaign. Melgen's home was raided again on October 22 but he still refused to cooperate with investigators.

On April 1, 2015, the United States Department of Justice indicted Menendez and Melgen in United States v. Menendez (3d Cir. 2016). The charges against Menendez included bribery, fraud, and making false statements. According to the indictment, Menendez asked top State Department officials to pressure the Dominican Republic's government to enforce a port-security contract that would benefit Melgen's company while at the same time Melgen was promising to give $60,000 to Menendez's campaign. Prosecutors also charged that Menendez acted as Melgen's "personal senator", helping obtain visas for several of Melgen's girlfriends. In return, Menendez was accused of accepting a range of gifts from Melgen, including trips on Melgen's private jet, three nights at a five-star Paris hotel, a round of golf at a private club in West Palm Beach, and access to an exclusive Dominican resort—some of which Menendez allegedly failed to report on financial disclosure forms. Melgen also donated a substantial amount of money to Menendez's political campaigns, and prosecutors said that $750,000 of those contributions were tied to personal benefits Menendez accepted.

After his indictment, Menendez voluntarily stepped down as ranking member of the Foreign Relations Committee. His trial began on September 6, 2017, before Judge William H. Walls of the United States District Court for the District of New Jersey. On November 16, 2017, Walls declared a mistrial due to the jury's inability to reach a verdict on any charges. On January 31, 2018, the Justice Department announced it was dropping all charges against Menendez. The case was strongly shaped by McDonnell v. United States, the 2016 Supreme Court decision to vacate the corruption conviction of former Virginia Governor Bob McDonnell, which narrowed the legal definition of public corruption and made it harder for prosecutors to prove that a political official engaged in bribery. Melgen was convicted of 66 counts of health-care fraud and in February 2018 was sentenced to 17 years in prison; President Trump commuted his sentence in January 2021.

In April 2018, the United States Senate Select Committee on Ethics "severely admonished" Menendez in a letter, writing:

The Committee has found that over a six-year period you knowingly and repeatedly accepted gifts of significant value from Dr. Melgen without obtaining required Committee approval, and that you failed to publicly disclose certain gifts as required by Senate Rule and federal law. Additionally, while accepting these gifts, you used your position as a Member of the Senate to advance Dr. Melgen's personal and business interests. The Committee has determined that this conduct violated Senate Rules, federal law, and applicable standards of conduct. Accordingly, the Committee issues you this Public Letter of Admonition and also directs you to repay the fair market value of all impermissible gifts not already repaid.

=== 2023 indictment ===
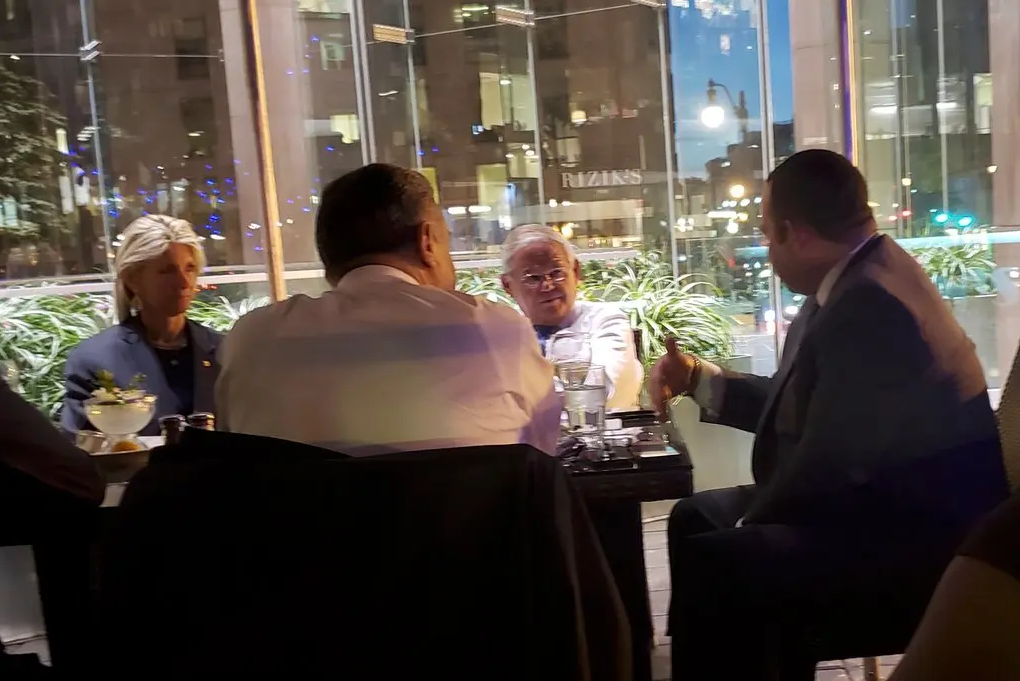
Menendez was surveilled and photographed by FBI agents at Morton's The Steakhouse in Washington, DC in May 2019.

Beginning in late 2022, questions were raised about whether Menendez or his wife accepted allowable gifts from an Edgewater, New Jersey, halal meat provider and whether an Egyptian firm received unwarranted favorable treatment. Subpoenas unrelated to the latter firm were issued in May 2023 to Nicholas Sacco, the mayor of North Bergen, New Jersey, and others. Investigators found $480,000 in cash and more than $100,000 worth of gold bars at Menendez's home. On September 22, 2023, federal prosecutors in Manhattan charged five people, including Menendez and his wife Nadine, with corruption in a new indictment.

One of the allegations was that Menendez "provided sensitive U.S. Government information and took other steps that secretly aided the Government of Egypt". Another was that he used his position to pressure prosecutors in New Jersey who were involved in the cases of his friends Fred Daibes and Jose Uribe in exchange for financial gifts from the two men. According to the Senate Historical Office, Menendez is the first sitting senator to be indicted on two unrelated criminal matters. After the indictment, he gave up his position as chair of the Senate Foreign Relations Committee.

Over the following days, Democratic Party politicians such as New Jersey Governor Phil Murphy, New Jersey General Assembly Speaker Craig Coughlin, and numerous U.S. senators called for Menendez's resignation. Menendez said: "It is not lost on me how quickly some are rushing to judge a Latino and push him out of his seat. I am not going anywhere." Senate Majority Leader Chuck Schumer said that Menendez "has a right to due process and a fair trial". Representative Andy Kim responded that given Menendez's refusal to resign, he would run in the Democratic primary for Menendez's seat in the 2024 United States Senate election in New Jersey. On November 15, 2023, Murphy's wife, Tammy Murphy, announced that she was running for Menendez's Senate seat. On March 24, 2024, she suspended her campaign.

On October 13, 2023, prosecutors filed new charges that Menendez "provided sensitive U.S. Government information and took other steps that secretly aided the Government of Egypt" and failed to register as an agent of a foreign power for over four years. Senator John Fetterman called on the Senate to expel Menendez.

In a superseding indictment filed on January 2, 2024, prosecutors alleged that Menendez made positive comments about Qatar in order to help a New Jersey real estate developer secure millions in funding from a member of the Qatari royal family. In exchange, Menendez allegedly received gifts including cash, gold, designer watches, and Formula One tickets.

On March 5, 2024, Menendez and his wife were charged with obstruction of justice after prosecutors alleged that his attorneys had lied about payments two businessmen made on his wife's house and car. Menendez claims the payments were loans he later repaid, but prosecutors claim they were bribes. The indictment came the week after one of the businessmen, Jose Uribe, pleaded guilty to charges of fraud and bribery.

=== Trial, conviction, and sentencing ===
United States v. Menendez
- Court: United States District Court for the Southern District of New York
- Full case name: United States of America v. Robert Menendez
- Citation: 1:23-cr-00490

Court membership
- Judge sitting: Sidney H. Stein

Jury selection for Menendez's trial began on May 13, 2024. On June 4, an FBI agent testified about surveillance she had conducted against Menendez in May 2019 at Morton's The Steakhouse in Washington, D.C., where Menendez and his wife, Nadine, were dining with three others, including an Egyptian official. Agents also testified about a search they performed of a safe deposit box in New Jersey Nadine Menendez used, in which they found $80,000 in cash. The defense noted that Menendez himself had never accessed the safety deposit box.

On June 6, the prosecution called former New Jersey attorney general Gurbir Grewal to the stand. Grewal told the court that in September 2019 Menendez invited him to a meeting at Menendez's office in Newark, at which Menendez complained about Grewal's office's treatment of Hispanic defendants in a trucking insurance fraud investigation; when Menendez made clear he was referring to an ongoing case, Grewal ended the meeting and left.

Closing arguments took place on July 9 and 10. Jury deliberations began on July 12. On July 16, the jury convicted Menendez of all charges, including bribery, extortion, honest services fraud, obstruction of justice, and conspiracy. Sentencing was originally scheduled for October 29, but was delayed to January 29, 2025.

On January 29, 2025, Menendez was sentenced to 11 years in prison. The start of his sentence was delayed to June 6, 2025, so he could attend his wife's trial for bribery and corruption charges in March. Outside the court, Menendez stated the "process is political and it's corrupted to the core [...] I hope President Trump cleans up the cesspool and restores the integrity to the system."

On April 21, 2025, Menendez's wife Nadine was found guilty by a jury in her federal bribery trial. The jury returned a verdict of guilty on all counts. Among the 15 counts were obstruction of justice and conspiring to make her husband an agent of Egypt. Egypt had granted Wael Hana's company, IS EG Halal, a monopoly on halal meat imports to Egypt, and the company was used to funnel bribes to Robert and Nadine Menendez.

Menendez's reporting date was then pushed back to June 17, 2025, to allow him to attend his stepdaughter's wedding. This was the final delay granted, with the judge stating that no further postponements would be allowed. Menendez began serving his sentence on June 17, 2025. He was originally incarcerated at the Federal Correctional Institution, Schuylkill, before being transferred to FCI Allenwood Low on July 1, 2025.

On September 11, 2025, Nadine Menendez was sentenced to 4½ years in prison and three years of supervised release. She was ordered to report to prison on July 10, 2026.

== Awards and honors ==
West New York, New Jersey, which borders Menendez's childhood hometown of Union City to the north, renamed Public School No. 3 in his honor; it is now known as Robert Menendez Elementary School. The renaming ceremony was held on December 4, 2013. Following Menendez's conviction in July 2024, West New York officials agreed to revert the school to its previous name in time for the upcoming school year. In 2021, President of Greece Katerina Sakellaropoulou awarded Menendez the Grand Cross of the Order of Honour for "his contribution to the deepening of Greek-US relations and the promotion of peace and cooperation in the wider region". Menendez also received the Grand Cross of the Order of Makarios III from President of Cyprus Nicos Anastasiades for "his contribution to promoting human rights, the rule of law, and democracy". In 2014, Prime Minister of Spain Mariano Rajoy awarded Menendez the Grand Cross of The Order of Isabella the Catholic for "his dedication to Spain and the Hispanic community and his excellent work in developing the links between Spain and the United States".

- Greece:
  - Grand Cross of the Order of Honour
  - Star for Merit and Honour (Ministry of National Defence commendation)
- Cyprus:
  - Grand Cross of the Order of Makarios III
- Spain:
  - Grand Cross of The Order of Isabella the Catholic

== Personal life ==
In 1976, Menendez married Jane Jacobsen, a teacher for the Union City Board of Education and Union City Public Schools. They had two children: Alicia Menendez, an MSNBC television commentator/host, and Rob Menendez, who worked as the Commissioner of the Port Authority of New York and New Jersey and was elected to Congress in New Jersey's 8th congressional district in 2022 as a Democrat. Menendez and Jacobsen divorced in 2005. He has four grandchildren.

Later, Menendez dated Gwendolyn Beck, an author who later ran for Congress. In 2010, he brought her to the White House for a state dinner.

In December 2013, Menendez proposed to his girlfriend, Alicia Mucci, in the Capitol rotunda. Some sources say they married that month, but many others indicate that they never married.

He began a relationship with Nadine Arslanian in 2018. Reports conflict as to whether they had an "on-again, off-again relationship" for most of the year or met in December 2018 at the IHOP in Union City.

On the night of Wednesday, December 12, 2018, Arslanian was driving in Bogota, New Jersey when she struck and killed pedestrian Richard Koop, who was crossing the street after being dropped off by a ride-share across the street from his home. Police at the scene interviewed Arslanian, who said the victim "jumped on my windshield", but she was not tested for sobriety, given a summons or taken into custody. Police blamed the accident on the pedestrian and it received little media coverage.

In October 2019, Menendez and Arslanian traveled to India, where he proposed to her at the Taj Mahal. They married in October 2020. She has two children from a prior marriage, and was divorced in 2005. In September 2023, Arslanian was indicted on federal bribery charges alongside Menendez. Arslanian's 2018 car incident resurfaced in the federal indictment, where prosecutors alleged Menendez interfered with the prosecution of a New Jersey businessman in exchange for a Mercedes to replace his wife's damaged car.

As of 2009, Menendez lived in Hoboken. In 2011, he lived in North Bergen, and in 2014 he moved to Paramus. In 2018, he moved to Harrison, and in 2020 he moved into his new wife's home, in Englewood Cliffs.

Since February 2025, Menendez's daughter, Alicia, has co-hosted MSNBC's 7pm ET weekday newscast.

== Electoral history ==
=== New Jersey Assembly ===
1987 New Jersey's 33rd State Assembly district Democratic primary election
Party	Candidate	Votes	%	+%
Democratic	Bernard Kenny Jr.	10,132	33%	
Democratic	Robert ("Bob") Menendez	9,788	32%	
Democratic	Leonard Altamura	5,493	18%	
Democratic	Sixto Macias	5,147	17%	

1987 New Jersey's 33rd State Assembly district election
Party	Candidate	Votes	%	+%
Democratic	Bernard Kenny Jr.	18,810	30%	
Democratic	Robert ("Bob") Menendez	18,446	29%	
Republican	Angelo Valente	12,888	20%	
Republican	Jose Arango	12,638	20%	
"Pride-Responsibility"	Michael Dapuzzo	557	1%	
"Pride-Responsibility"	Wanda Morales	312	<1%	

1989 New Jersey's 33rd State Assembly district election
Party	Candidate	Votes	%	+%
Democratic	Bernard Kenny Jr. (inc.)	24,294	34%	
Democratic	Robert ("Bob") Menendez (inc.)	23,767	34%	
Republican	Ann Clark	11,738	17%	
Republican	Antonio Miguelez	10,800	15%	

=== State Senate ===
1991 New Jersey's 33rd State Senate district election
Party	Candidate	Votes	%	+%
Democratic	Robert ("Bob") Menendez	19,151	69%	
Republican	Carlos Munoz	8,652	31%	

=== House ===
1992 New Jersey's 13th congressional district Democratic primary
Party	Candidate	Votes	%	+%
Democratic	Robert ("Bob") Menendez	24,245	68%	
Democratic	Robert Haney Jr.	11,409	32%	

New Jersey's 13th congressional district: 1992
Party	Candidate	Votes	%	±%
Democratic	Robert ("Bob") Menendez	93,670	64%	
Republican	Fred J. Theemling Jr.	44,529	31%	
Stop Tax Increases	Joseph D. Bonacci	2,363	2%	
Libertarian	Len Flynn	1,539	1%	
Communist	John E. Rummel	1,525	1%	
Socialist Workers	Jane Harris	1,406	1%	
Majority		49,141	33%	

New Jersey's 13th congressional district: 1994
Party	Candidate	Votes	%	±%
Democratic	Robert ("Bob") Menendez	67,688	71%	+7
Republican	Fernando A. Alonso	24,071	25%	−6
We the People	Frank J. Rubino Jr.	1,494	2%	N/A
Politicians Are Crooks	Herbert H. Shaw	1,319	1%	N/A
Socialist Workers	Steven Marshall	895	1%	N/A
Majority		43,617	46%	+13

New Jersey's 13th congressional district Democratic primary: 1996
Party	Candidate	Votes	%	+%
Democratic	Robert ("Bob") Menendez	34,685	93%	
Democratic	Christopher Curioli	2,685	7%	

New Jersey's 13th congressional district: 1996
Party	Candidate	Votes	%	±%
Democratic	Robert ("Bob") Menendez	115,459	79%	+8
Republican	Carlos E. Munoz	24,427	17%	−8
Independent	Herbert H. Shaw	2,136	1%	0
Independent	Mike Buoncristiano	2,094	1%	N/A
Independent	William P. Estrada	720	<1%	N/A
Independent	Rupert Ravens	637	<1%	N/A
Majority		91,032	62%	+16

New Jersey's 13th congressional district: 1998
Party	Candidate	Votes	%	±%
Democratic	Robert ("Bob") Menendez	70,308	80%	+1
Republican	Theresa de Leon	14,615	17%	0
Independent	Richard S. Hester, Sr.	1,276	1%	N/A
Independent	Richard G. Rivera	872	1%	N/A
Independent	Susan Anmuth	752	1%	N/A
Majority		55,693	63%	+1

New Jersey's 13th congressional district: 2000
Party	Candidate	Votes	%	±%
Democratic	Robert ("Bob") Menendez	117,856	79%	−1
Republican	Theresa de Leon	27,849	19%	+2
Independent	Claudette C. Meliere	2,741	2%	N/A
Independent	Dick Hester	562	<1%	N/A
Independent	Herbert H. Shaw	357	<1%	N/A
Majority		90,007	60%	−3

New Jersey's 13th congressional district: 2002
Party	Candidate	Votes	%	±%
Democratic	Robert ("Bob") Menendez	72,605	78%	−1
Republican	James Geron	16,852	18%	−1
Green	Pat Henry Faulkner	1,195	1%	N/A
Anti-Corruption Doctor	Esmat Zaklama	740	1%	N/A
Pro Life Conservative	Dick Hester	732	1%	N/A
Politicians are Crooks	Herbert H. Shaw	573	1%	N/A
Majority		55,753	60%	0

New Jersey's 13th congressional district Democratic primary: 2004
Party	Candidate	Votes	%	+%
Democratic	Robert ("Bob") Menendez	33,622	87%	
Democratic	Steven Fulop	4,851	13%	

New Jersey's 13th congressional district: 2004
Party	Candidate	Votes	%	±%
Democratic	Robert ("Bob") Menendez	121,018	76%	−2
Republican	Richard W. Piatkowski	35,288	22%	+4
Pro Life Conservative	Dick Hester	1,282	1%	N/A
Politicos son Corruptos	Herbert H. Shaw	1,066	1%	0
Socialist Workers	Angela L. Lariscy	887	1%	0
Majority		85,730	54%	−6

Write-in and minor candidate notes: In 1992, Donald K. Stoveken as an America First Populist received 682 votes. In 2000, Alina Lydia Fonteboa received 233 votes and Kari Sachs received 168 votes. In 2002, a candidate listed only as "Independent (The American Party)" received 34 votes; also, Herbert Shaw's full party name was "Politicians are Crooks – Politicos son Corruptos" (shortened for display purposes above).

=== Senate ===
2006 New Jersey United States Senate Democratic primary election
Party	Candidate	Votes	%	+%
Democratic	Robert ("Bob") Menendez (inc.)	159,604	84%	
Democratic	James Kelly Jr.	30,340	16%	

2006 United States Senate election in New Jersey
Party	Candidate	Votes	%	±%
Democratic	Robert ("Bob") Menendez (inc.)	1,200,843	53.3	+3.1
Republican	Thomas Kean Jr.	997,775	44.3	−2.8
Libertarian	Len Flynn	14,637	0.7	+0.4
Marijuana	Edward Forchion	11,593	0.5	n/a
Independent	J.M. Carter	7,918	0.4	+0.2
Independent	N. Leonard Smith	6,243	0.3	n/a
Independent	Daryl Brooks	5,138	0.2	n/a
Socialist Workers	Angela Lariscy	3,433	0.2	+0.1
Socialist	Gregory Pason	2,490	0.1	+0.0
Majority		203,068	9.0	
Turnout		2,250,070		
Democratic hold		Swing	3.26	

2012 United States Senate election in New Jersey
Party	Candidate	Votes	%	±%
Democratic	Robert ("Bob") Menendez (incumbent)	1,783,943	58.4%	+5.1%
Republican	Joseph Kyrillos	1,220,605	39.9%	−4.4%
Libertarian	Kenneth R. Kaplan	14,802	0.5%	−0.2%
Green	Ken Wolski	13,874	0.5%	+0.5%
Others		23,511	0.8%	−1.0%
Majority				
Turnout		3,056,735		

2018 Democratic primary results by county: Menendez: 70–80% Menendez: 60–70% Menendez: 50–60% McCormick: 50–60% McCormick: 60–70%

2018 Democratic primary results
Party	Candidate	Votes	%
Democratic	Bob Menendez (incumbent)	262,477	62.3
Democratic	Lisa McCormick	158,998	37.7
Total votes		421,475	100.0

2018 United States Senate election in New Jersey
Party	Candidate	Votes	%	±%
Democratic	Bob Menendez (incumbent)	1,711,654	54.01%	−4.86%
Republican	Bob Hugin	1,357,355	42.83%	+3.46%
Green	Madelyn Hoffman	25,150	0.79%	+0.32%
Libertarian	Murray Sabrin	21,212	0.67%	+0.17%
Independent	Natalie Rivera	19,897	0.63%	N/A
Independent	Tricia Flanagan	16,101	0.51%	N/A
Independent	Kevin Kimple	9,087	0.29%	N/A
Independent	Hank Schroeder	8,854	0.28%	N/A
Total votes		'3,169,310'	'100.0%'	N/A
Democratic hold				

== See also ==
- List of Hispanic and Latino Americans in the United States Congress
- Trump–Ukraine scandal
- Eric Adams case, George Santos case, and Donald Trump cases; contemporary 2020s federal political corruption cases.

== Explanatory notes ==
U.S. House of Representatives
Preceded by Jim Saxton	Member of the U.S. House of Representatives from New Jersey's 13th congressional district 1993–2006	Succeeded by Albio Sires
Party political offices
Preceded by Barbara Kennelly	Vice Chair of the House Democratic Caucus; 1999–2003	Succeeded by Jim Clyburn
Preceded by Martin Frost	Chair of the House Democratic Caucus; 2003–2006	Succeeded by Jim Clyburn
Preceded by Jon Corzine	Democratic nominee for U.S. Senator from New Jersey (Class 1); 2006, 2012, 2018	Succeeded by Andy Kim
Preceded by Chuck Schumer	Chair of the Democratic Senatorial Campaign Committee; 2009–2011	Succeeded by Patty Murray
U.S. Senate
Preceded by Jon Corzine	U.S. Senator (Class 1) from New Jersey; 2006–2024; Served alongside: Frank Lautenberg, Jeffrey Chiesa, Cory Booker	Succeeded by George Helmy
Preceded by John Kerry	Chair of the Senate Foreign Relations Committee; 2013–2015	Succeeded by Bob Corker
Preceded by Bob Corker	Ranking Member of the Senate Foreign Relations Committee; 2015	Succeeded by Ben Cardin
Preceded by Ben Cardin	Ranking Member of the Senate Foreign Relations Committee; 2018–2021	Succeeded by Jim Risch
Preceded by Jim Risch	Chair of the Senate Foreign Relations Committee; 2021–2023	Succeeded by Ben Cardin
U.S. order of precedence (ceremonial)
Preceded by Bill Bradley as Former U.S. Senator	Order of precedence of the United States as Former U.S. Senator	Succeeded by Ben Cardin as Former U.S. Senator
