= Janice Pottker =

Janice Pottker is a Potomac, Maryland, author. She has a Ph.D. in sociology from Columbia University. She has lectured for the Smithsonian Institution, for the Franklin D. Roosevelt Presidential Library and Museum and for the Corcoran Gallery of Art.

== Controversy ==
Around 1990, she wrote an article for Regardie's, a magazine that covered the Washington business area, about Feld Entertainment. The CEO of Feld, Kenneth Jeffrey Feld paid Clair George and his assistant Robert Eringer $2.3 million to have them and their associates wiretap, bug and spy on Pottker.

== Publications ==
- Sex Bias in the Schools. Fairleigh Dickinson University Press. 1977. ISBN 0-8386-1464-7.
- Born to Power: Heirs to America's Leading Businesses. Barron's. 1992. ISBN 0812014561.
- Celebrity Washington: Who They Are, Where They Live, and Why They're Famous. Writer's Cramp Books. 1995. ISBN 0964598302.
- Janet and Jackie: the Story of a Mother and Her Daughter, Jacqueline Kennedy Onassis. St. Martin's Press. 2001. ISBN 0312266073.
- Sara and Eleanor: The Story of Sara Delano Roosevelt and Her Daughter-in-Law, Eleanor Roosevelt. St. Martin's Press. 2004. ISBN 0312303408.
