= Robert Eringer =

American journalist

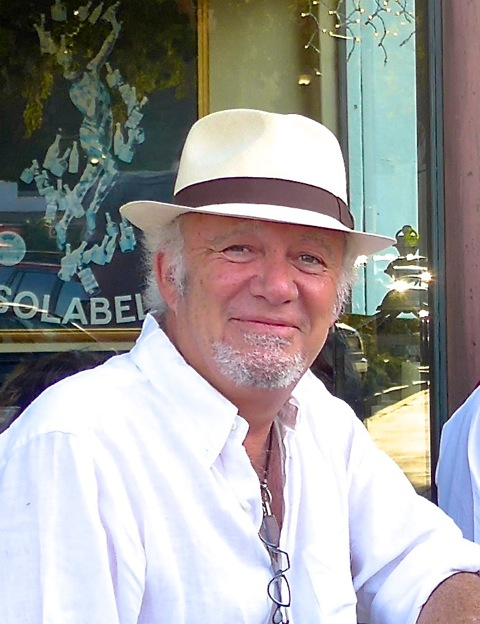
- Born: Robert Henry Eringer; October 5, 1954 (age 72)
- Citizenship: United States
- Occupation: Investigative journalist
- Writing career
- Years active: 1977–present
- Genre: Counterintelligence
- Website: RobertEringer.com

Robert Eringer (born October 5, 1954) is an American author, investigative journalist and private-sector counterintelligence operative. Salon magazine described Eringer as an "obscure journalist" with ties to Clair George, the former deputy director of Operations of the CIA. Eringer freelanced for the FBI's Foreign Counter-Intelligence Division to assist with the apprehension of Edward Lee Howard, an ex-CIA officer who defected to the Soviet Union in 1985. In this ruse, Eringer commissioned Howard to write the Spy's Guide to Central Europe. Eringer describes his assignments for the FBI, which also included keeping tabs on Ira Einhorn, in his book Ruse: Undercover with FBI Counterintelligence (2008).

== Career ==
In 1976, "Bilderberg File: The Men Who Rule the World?" was published in the UK magazine, Verdict, commencing Eringer's journalism career. Research for the book that later followed, The Global Manipulators (1980), led to professional relationship with Dr. Carroll Quigley, the author of Tragedy and Hope (1966), and Eringer sat-in on Quigley's Western Civilizations course at Georgetown University in 1976. In 1978, Eringer completed coursework at the University Southern California (London, UK) in International Relations. The graduate-level program included field-trips to places such as the U.S. Army Russian Institute in Garmisch, Germany, which led to his writing a feature article, "U.S. agents learn ropes at 'school of spies'" (1986), for the Toronto Star. Subsequent undercover journalism led to damaging exposé magazine articles to the Liberty Lobby, "The Force of Willis Carto" was published in Mother Jones and he went undercover to expose Ku Klux Klan (klavern) activity in Europe for The Sunday People.

== Controversies ==
=== Pottker et al. v Feld et al. ===
As a Washington D. C. based literary agent and book consultant in the 1990s, Eringer found himself working a controversial assignment for Clair George, a former deputy director of Operations of the CIA who was convicted on one count and later pardoned in the Iran-Contra scandal. In 1990, a celebrity journalist, Janice Pottker, published an 11,000 word article about the Feld family in Regardie's magazine. Upon reading, Kenneth Feld (Ringling Bros. and Barnum & Bailey Circus) took umbrage to her portrayal of his parents and hired Clair George as a consultant to mitigate damages that the proposed book might cause the family and business. George in turn, assigned Eringer (1993–95) to distract the author by encouraging her to write about other topics. Pottker suspects that the unauthorized Feld family biography became an untouchable topic in literary circles, but two of Pottker's books, Crisis in Candyland (1995) and Celebrity Washington (1996), were published during this time period.(p3) In 1999, Pottker sued for $60 million, claiming, "invasion of privacy, fraud and infliction of mental distress." Citing ongoing litigation, Feld Entertainment refrained from commenting for the May 4, 2003, 60 Minutes feature and the outcome of Pottker et al. v. Feld et al. appears to be unresolved or sealed as of October 2014. However, Pottker informed the St. Petersberg Times that she has "no plans to write about Feld or Ringling Bros. ever again."

On January 18, 2004, the St. Petersburg Times retrospectively reported that Janice Pottker had filed a complaint against the Feld family, Clair George, and Robert Eringer in 1999, seeking $120 million for invasion of privacy, interference in business relationships, infliction of emotional distress, fraud, conspiracy and breach of contractual obligations. Pottker filed the lawsuit after discovering that Ken Feld and Clair George paid Eringer to "...to steer her away from stories on Feld..." and prevent Pottker's proposed book, "Highwire" an unauthorized biography of Irvin Feld and the Feld family from being published. "I interviewed this man once in 1988, and I feel as if he's been stalking me ever since," Pottker said of Kenneth Feld.

=== Monaco ===
Eringer vacationed in the Principality of Monaco throughout the 1980s and wrote Monaco Cool (1992), while living in Monaco for two years (1988–89). He returned to reside in Monaco on behalf of a private intelligence client in 1994 and 1995. In late 1999, Prince Albert II, the hereditary prince, commissioned Eringer for a report on a Monaco-based Russian businessman named Alexey Fedorichev; (Note: In July 1998, Vladimir Putin travelled from Moscow to the south of France to conduct important meetings when he was named head of the FSB.) subsequently, the reigning monarch, Prince Rainier III, declined to allow Fedorichev to invest in ASM, Monaco's football club. While completing ongoing counterintelligence activities for the FBI, Eringer's additional intelligence reports on Russian activities in Monaco led to a full-time retainer on June 16, 2002, as Prince Albert's intelligence adviser. (Note: According to Eringer, Graham Alan Pedder Smith (born March 13, 1940 Scotland) is closely related to numerous firms, including a Monaco based firm Sotrama, which are associated with Vladimir Putin and Putin's close friends. Smith and his close associate Markus M. Hasler often operated through FIBEKO TREUHANDANSTALT. Smith is married to Isolde Reinhilde Smith and they reside at Asperguat, 9492 Eschen, Liechtenstein. Graham Smith was removed from the (UK) Institute of Chartered Accountants in 1992 for failing to cooperate with an inquiry because of his irregularities during the collapse of London United Insurance (LUI).) (Note: Eringer explained that he had met with persons close to Putin during the 1990s including retired KGB colonel Igor Prelin (Russian: Игорь Николаевич Прелин; born 1937) and former KGB chief Vladimir Kryuchkov.)

==== Power struggle in the Monarchy ====
Upon ascension in 2005, Prince Albert II announced that Monaco would shed W. Somerset Maugham's moniker of, "a sunny place for shady people." In his accession speech, the Prince declared that he would fight with all of his strength to ensure that money-laundering and Monaco would no longer be synonyms in the common vernacular. The declaration caused an expansion of Eringer's scope of responsibilities, the Prince commissioned Eringer to create and direct Monaco's first intelligence service. One of the Monaco Intelligence Service's (MIS) early recommendations was to deny the renewal of Sir Mark Thatcher's residency card due to a troubling background check. In addition to investigations, Eringer's MIS established inter-governmental liaison relationships with twenty foreign intelligence services, including the CIA and the (UK) Secret Intelligence Service.

Prince Albert II's original anti-corruption cabinet appointments (December 2005) did not last long. As described by Nice RendezVous, MIS vetted Cabinet Director, Jean-Luc Allavena was dismissed in November 2006, and replaced in favor of the serving General Secretariat, Georges Lisimachio. An attempt to dismiss Eringer was made in 2006; however, Prince Albert asked him to remain, limiting his scope of operations to international intelligence liaison relationships. MIS was funded without incident throughout 2007, but Eringer's invoice for Quarter 1, 2008, went unpaid, calls and correspondence went unanswered for the remainder of the year.

Eringer filed a lawsuit for €340,000 in unpaid wages and severance in 2009, initially Monaco lawyers denied his employment, but after 100 pages of supporting evidence were presented to the court, the lawyers were forced to rescind their denial. The Palace of Monaco portrayed the court case as a blackmail attempt to "exploit the US judicial system to generate publicity to forward his extortionist agenda" by a "shakedown artist". Eringer has been described as having mythomania by Stéphane Bern, the author of Grace Kelly (2007), criticized for promoting conspiracy theories and called a "false spy". In 2011, it was reported that Eringer was writing an "anti-Monaco" blog.

==== Results of Monaco litigation ====
Lawyers for the Palace of Monaco publicly called Eringer a shakedown artist when he originally sued for $60,000 to recover back-wages and expenditures. Eringer however, had already filed a thirty-four page declaration, detailing his duties and findings with the Superior Court of California, County of Santa Barbara (Case No., 1339892), on October 5, 2009.

The Superior Court of California ruled that "because all of Eringer's services were governmental, employing him was not a commercial act exempt from FSIA immunity." According to a court judgment filed on July 10, 2013, the U.S. District Court of Appeals for the Ninth Circuit affirmed the district court's original ruling. The court determined that "according to his own attorneys and affidavit, Eringer's assignments" for the Principality were "not the type of employment private parties can undertake" and therefore fell within the Foreign Sovereign Immunities Act of 1976 (FSIA).

In 2011, Eringer was ordered by the Tribunal de grande instance de Paris to remove defamatory illustrations, photographs, and blog posts of and about Prince Albert II, lawyer Thierry Lacoste, chief of administration and accountant Claude Palmero, and chief of police André Muhlberger from his blog. In September 2012, the French justice system found Eringer guilty of criminal defamation and insult.

Ultimately, the two parties sued each other to a standstill, Eringer's suit to recover wages and expenses against the Prince and Principality is moot under the Foreign Sovereign Immunities Act of 1976 (FSIA) and Monaco's defamation and insult suit is moot under the SPEECH Act.

=== Noncompliance with California Department of Alcoholic Beverage Control ===
Eringer's Santa Barbara-based bar, Bo Henry's Cocktail Lounge, closed for five days in March 2015 due to alcoholic beverage sales to a minor. A first offense in the bar's history, Eringer was not present at the time and chose a suspension over the $200.00 fine to impress upon employees and customers that serving minors would not be tolerated.

== Publications ==
=== Books ===
- The Global Manipulators: The Bilderberg Group... the Trilateral Commission... Covert Power Groups of the West. Bristol (UK): Pentacle Books (1980). ISBN 0906850045. OCLC 26551991.
- The Conspiracy Peddlers: A Review of the Conspiracy Media in the United States. Mason, Mich.: Loompanics Unlimited (1981). OCLC 12645504.
- Strike for Freedom!: The Story of Lech Walesa and Polish Solidarity. New York: Dodd, Mead & Co. (1982). OCLC 8669408. ISBN 0396080650.
- Monaco Cool. Silver Spring, Md.: Enigma Books (1992) ISBN 0910155232.
- Zubrick's Rock: A Novel. National Press Books (1995). OCLC 31709762. ISBN 1882605217.
- Crinkum, Crankum: A Novel. Silver Spring, Md.: Enigma Books (1998). ISBN 0910155356. OCLC 37331715.
- Lo Mein. Mt. Pleasant, S.C.: Corinthian Books (2000). OCLC 45015211. ISBN 1929175140.
- Parallel Truths. Mt. Pleasant, S.C.: Corinthian Books (2000). OCLC 45761737. ISBN 1929175167.
- Spookaroonie. Mt. Pleasant, S.C.: Corinthian Books (2001). ISBN 9781929175277. OCLC 48669475.
- Granny's Lost Her Marbles. Bartleby Press. (2003). Humor. ISBN 0910155526.
- The Battle for Dung Hill. Bartleby Press (2003). Humor. ISBN 0910155518.
- Gone Berserk: Runturing in Reykjavik. Bartleby Press (2003). Humor. ISBN 0910155542.
- My Summer Vacation: A Weekend in Jersey. Bartleby Press (2003). Humor.ISBN 0910155550.
- An Ear in Provence: Listening to the French. Bartleby Press (2003). Humor. ISBN 0910155534.
- Ruse: Undercover with FBI Counterintelligence. Nebraska: Potomac Books (2008). OCLC 755573094. ISBN 1597973173.
- Reunion-Sunset Romance, Two Novellas. Earthshine Editions (2010). ISBN 0984587713.
- Cloak & Corkscrew: Where CIA Meets Hollywood. Earthshine Editions (2011). OCLC 793306788. ISBN 098458773X.
- Three Stories. Earthshine Editions (2012). ISBN 0984587756.
- Into Art. Earthshine Editions (2012). ISBN 0984587748.
- Montecito Madness. Earthshine Editions (2013). OCLC 870884951.ISBN 0984587772.
- Folie a Deux (autobiography). Earthshine Editions (2013). ISBN 0984587780.
- My Story. Earthshine Editions (2013). ISBN 0984587799.
- The Spymaster & Me. Earthshine Editions (2013). ISBN 0984587764.
- Motional Blur: A Novel. New York: Skyhorse Publishing (2016). ISBN 978-1510711143. OCLC 958962862.

=== Interviews ===
- "Secret Agent Man: No Wonder Miles Copeland’s Kids Formed the Police." Interview with Miles Copeland, Jr. Rolling Stone, no. 465 (January 16, 1986), pp. 20+.
- "Interview With the Antiterrorist." Interview with Mitchell L. WerBell III. SAGA (magazine) (1986), pp. 6-9.
