= Ruse (book) =

Ruse: Undercover with FBI Counterintelligence
- Author: Robert Eringer
- Genre: Creative nonfiction, autobiography
- Published: 2008
- Media type: Hardcover
- Pages: 215
- ISBN: 9781597973175
- OCLC: 755573094
- Dewey Decimal: 327.1273 B
- LC Class: HV
- Preceded by: An Ear in Provence: Listening to the French
- Followed by: Reunion-Sunset Romance, Two Novellas

Ruse is an autobiographical account written by investigative journalist and FBI counterintelligence operative, Robert Eringer. Ruse covers the author's covert interactions with CIA defector, Edward Lee Howard in the late years of his life. The primary objective is to convince Howard to travel outside of Russia, to a jurisdiction where he could be arrested and extradited. Eringer's cover as a literary agent also allows him to gain the confidence of the 23 year fugitive, Unicorn Killer (Ira Einhorn). Frustrated with extradition negotiations, the FBI approved Eringer's plan to keep tabs on Einhorn in case that he would attempt to flee from France during extradition negotiations. Activities described in Ruse also expose Cuban intelligence (DGI) operatives in Washington D.C., and preemptively exposed a Cuban plot to disenfranchise Senator Bob Menendez. When allegations were made against the Senator in 2012, a short passage from Ruse, reported in The Record in 2008, caused Alex Seitz-Wald (Salon) to Tweet his theory.

== Summary ==
The author's cover as a book agent served to open communications with fugitives who wished to capitalize on their memoirs. Instead of just publishing these books, Robert Eringer approached the FBI with his plan to "ruse" these fugitives and attempt to bring them to justice. Set between the end of the Cold War and September 11, 2001, Ruse is an account of Eringer's involvement in the efforts of the rendition of Unicorn Killer (Ira Einhorn) and CIA defector Edward Lee Howard. Howard died with operations on hold, due to diplomatic concerns. Einhorn was arrested and is serving a life sentence. The Edward Lee Howard operation produced intelligence of interest in the Aldrich Ames double-agent case. The book includes candid statements from Russian operatives, during the period when Russia's security services were transitioning to the FSK and FSB.

== Senator Menendez conspiracy ==
In 2014, The Washington Post quoted from Ruse concerning unfounded allegations that Senator Menendez had underpaid a pair of unnamed prostitutes while on vacation in the Dominican Republic. The passage from Ruse was first picked up by Elizabeth Llorente, of The Record in Bergen County, NJ in early 2008. It appears that both Eringer and Menendez commented for the article at that time. In 2014, Menendez asked for an investigation into whether the plot originated with Cuban Intelligence.

== Approach ==
The book is written in three parts, "Hoodwinking Howard", "Conning the Cubans", "Bamboozling Beelzebub" and a short epilogue,"Blackmail, Vodka and Threat to Kill". Ruse is documented with dates and photographs of meetings and correspondence. On April 20, 1994, shortly after the arrest of Aldrich Ames, Eringer entered the country to meet with CIA defector Edward Lee Howard under conditions that Russia would consider espionage and with the knowledge that the FBI would disavow any connection to himself, or the operation.
