= Irvin Feld =

American businessman

- Born: May 9, 1918; Hagerstown, Maryland
- Died: September 6, 1984 (aged 66); Venice, Florida
- Occupation: Businessman
- Known for: Owner of Ringling Bros. and Barnum & Bailey Circus; Founder of Feld Entertainment
- Spouse: Adele Schwartz Feld
- Children: Kenneth Jeffrey Feld Karen Feld
- Relatives: Israel(brother); Fannie Feld (sister); Zelda Feld Fribush (sister); Doris Feld Goldstein (sister); Freda Miriam Feld Arenson (sister)

Irvin Feld (May 9, 1918 – September 6, 1984) was an entrepreneur who built a chain of record stores, promoted rock groups and produced concerts involving some of the biggest names in popular music. He was also the head of Ringling Bros. and Barnum & Bailey Circus, the founder of Feld Entertainment and a music promoter who is credited with discovering Paul Anka.

== Biography ==
Feld was born on May 9, 1918, in Hagerstown, Maryland, to Russian-Jewish immigrants. Following high school, in 1938 he and his brother opened a drugstore on Seventh Street NW in Washington, D.C., where records proved big sellers. He later opened Super Music City record stores, and eventually branched out into producing both his own records and his own live concerts. After ten years as one of several national promoters for the Ringling Circus, Feld, along with his brother Israel Feld and Houston Judge Roy Hofheinz, bought the circus on November 11, 1967, for $8 million. In 1968, he began the Ringling Brothers and Barnum & Bailey Clown College. He sold the circus to Mattel in 1971 for $50 million in Mattel stock. He bought it back from Mattel in 1982 for $22.8 million.

Feld died on September 6, 1984, at age 66, in Venice, Florida. He was survived by two children, Karen and Kenneth. He was remembered in the New York Times as the "man who saved the circus".

== Personal life and legacy ==
In 1946, he married Adele Feld. They had two children, Karen and Kenneth. After Adele Feld committed suicide in 1958, the children were raised by their aunt and uncle in Washington, DC. After Feld died in 1984, the circus passed to his son Kenneth Jeffrey Feld, who had joined the company in 1970. In 1987, Feld was inducted into the International Circus Hall of Fame.
