= Disney on Ice =

Disney ice rink show

Walt Disney's World on Ice

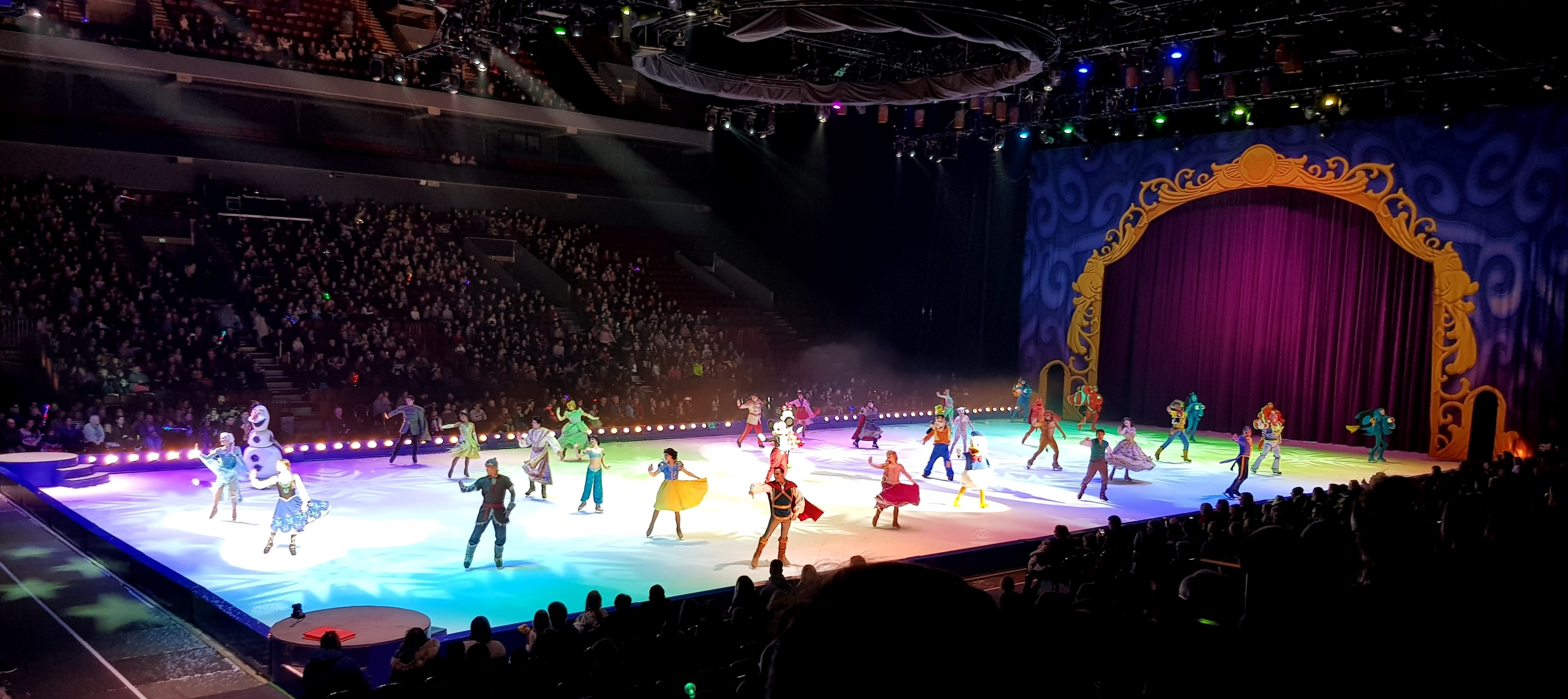
- Disney on Ice in Malmö, Sweden on January 17, 2019
- Genre: Ice show
- Founded: July 14, 1981; 45 years ago
- Headquarters: Palmetto, Florida
- Production output: Ice Follies And Holiday on Ice, Inc. (Feld Entertainment)
- Owners: Disney Live Entertainment; Disney Theatrical Group
- Subsidiaries: Disney Live!
- Website: Official website

Walt Disney's World on Ice, alternatively and currently known as Disney on Ice, is a series of touring ice shows produced by Feld Entertainment's Ice Follies And Holiday on Ice, Inc. division under agreement with The Walt Disney Company. Aimed primarily at children, the shows feature figure skaters portraying the roles of Disney characters in performances derived from various Disney films. Feld Entertainment licensed the rights to Disney material for ice shows, and includes shared merchandising revenue between Disney and Ice Follies.

== History ==
Soon after Mattel's Irvin & Kenneth Feld Productions purchased the Ice Follies and Holiday on Ice program rights in 1979, the company approached Walt Disney Productions about organizing and franchising a Disney-related show similar to the Ice Follies. Feld Productions, not long after their proposal, was granted license to the rights to Disney material for touring ice-skating productions. In 1981, they began under the name Walt Disney's World on Ice.

In March 1982, Irvin & Kenneth Feld purchased back Feld Productions from Mattel, including the absorbed Ice Follies and Walt Disney's World on Ice. In 1987, Walt Disney's World on Ice made its international debut in Japan with the "Happy Birthday Donald" show. In 1988, the company controlled and produced five touring shows, each coexisting in different international markets simultaneously. The name was changed to Disney on Ice in late 1997. By 2008, a new show was launched every year.

== Shows ==
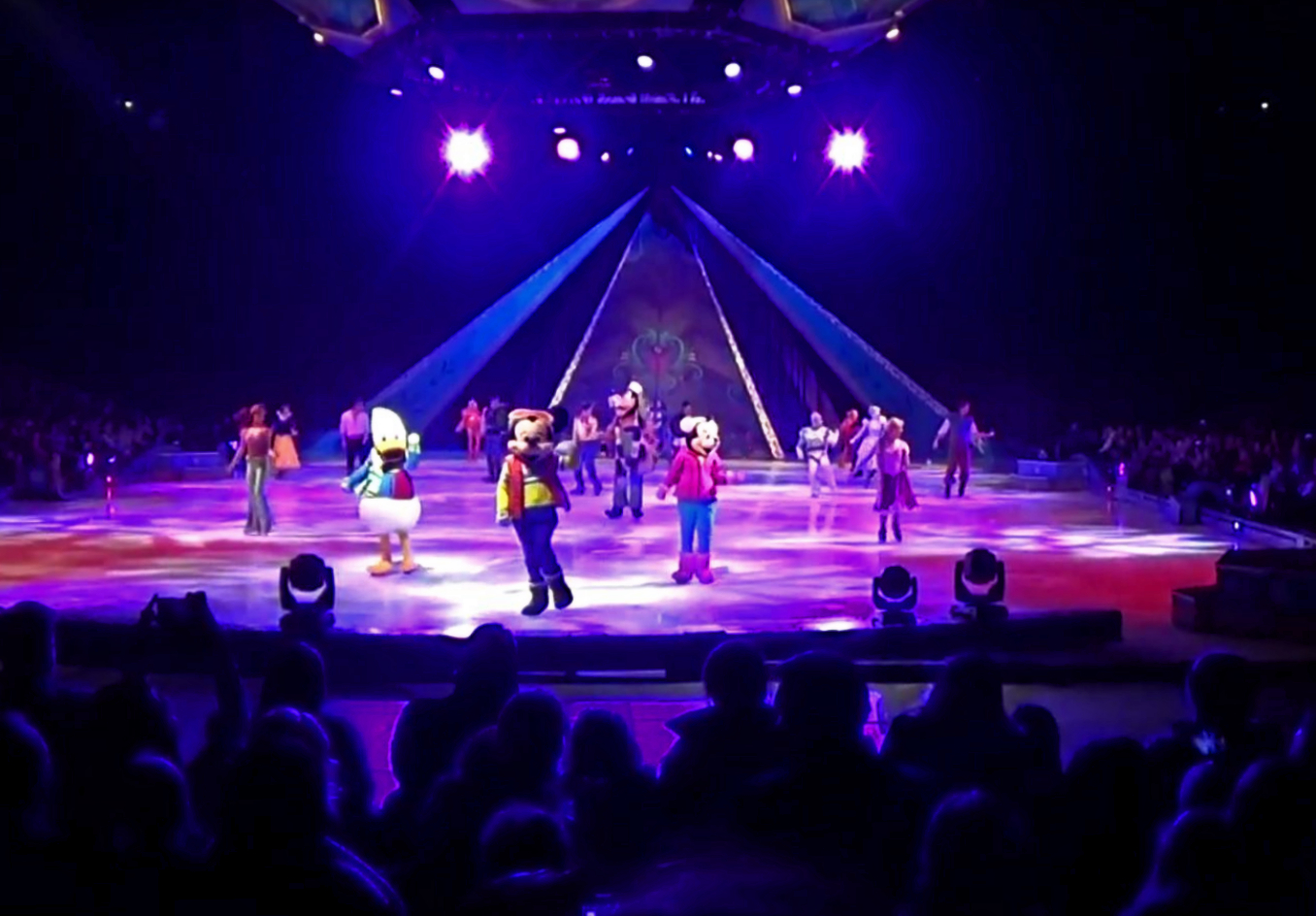
Frozen themed show at Hartwall Arena in Helsinki, Finland in 2017

The show is usually hosted by Mickey Mouse and Minnie Mouse, assisted at times by Goofy and Donald Duck. The series also implements characters and stories from recently released Disney films as a cross-promotion tactic, with each subject and films featured changing as the show annually updates.

In 2020, Disney on Ice shows were cancelled worldwide due to the COVID-19 pandemic. Performances eventually resumed on November 6, 2020, beginning with "Dream Big".

In 2027, Disney on Ice show official opening on August 21, 2027, beginning with based on the 1994 Disney animated film adaptation of the same name "The Lion King" movie theatrical phenomenal performances.

Show name	Years active	Notes	Formerly known as
Magic in the Stars	2023	N/A	
Road Trip Adventures	2019, 2022, 2024	N/A	
Mickey's Search Party	2018, 2021	N/A	
Find Your Hero	2012, 2021, 2022, 2024-2025	N/A	Rockin' Ever After; Magical Ice Festival; Reach for the Stars
Mickey and Friends	2009, 2018, 2021	N/A	Celebrations! Let’s Celebrate! Let’s Party! Follow your Heart; Mickey's Super Celebration; Celebrate Memories
Worlds of Enchantment	2008–2020	N/A	Worlds of Fantasy
Into the Magic	2002, 2022, 2025	N/A	Princess Classics; Dare to Dream; Live Your Dreams
Dream Big	2000, 2006, 2021–2024	N/A	Disney's Jungle Adventures; Princess Wishes; Princesses and Heroes
Let's Celebrate	1999, 2019–2023	50 characters from 14 films appear, alongside 30 songs.	75 Years of Disney Magic; 100 Years of Disney Magical Moments; 100 Years of Magic; The Magical World of Disney on Ice; All Star Parade; Everyone's Story
Frozen & Encanto	2014, 2022, 2025	Adaptations of the first titular films.	Frozen
Spotlight Magic	2026	Adaptations of the second titular films.	Spotlight Magic
The Lion King	2027–present	Based on the 1994 Walt Disney animated film adaptation of the same name.	The Lion King
