= Ice Follies =

Touring ice show

Ice Follies And Holiday on Ice, Inc.
- Trade name: Disney on Ice
- Formerly: Shipstads and Johnson Ice Follies, Inc. Holiday on Ice
- Type: Subsidiary
- Industry: Entertainment
- Founders: Oscar Johnson; Eddie Shipstad; Roy Shipstad
- Headquarters: Feld Entertainment Studio, Ellenton, Florida, United States
- Area served: Worldwide
- Production output: Touring ice shows
- Brands: Disney on Ice
- Parent: Feld Entertainment

The Ice Follies, formerly known as the Shipstads & Johnson Ice Follies, is a touring ice show featuring elaborate production numbers, similar in concept to Ice Capades. It was founded in 1936 by Eddie and Roy Shipstad and Oscar Johnson. In later years, Olympic skaters such as Donald Jackson, Barbara Berezowski, Peggy Fleming, and Janet Lynn were in the cast. Ice Follies also featured novelty acts such as Frick and Frack and Richard Dwyer, who was billed as "Mr. Debonair".

The production company is now called Ice Follies and Holiday on Ice, Inc., a subsidiary of Feld Entertainment which produces the shows under the Disney on Ice and "... on Ice" titles. Feld formed the new subsidiary from the Ice Follies and U.S. Holiday on Ice touring companies.

The show was a variety show that included a chorus line called The Ice Folliettes, which led to synchronized figure skating, that famously precisely performed a kick line and pinwheel on ice.

== History ==
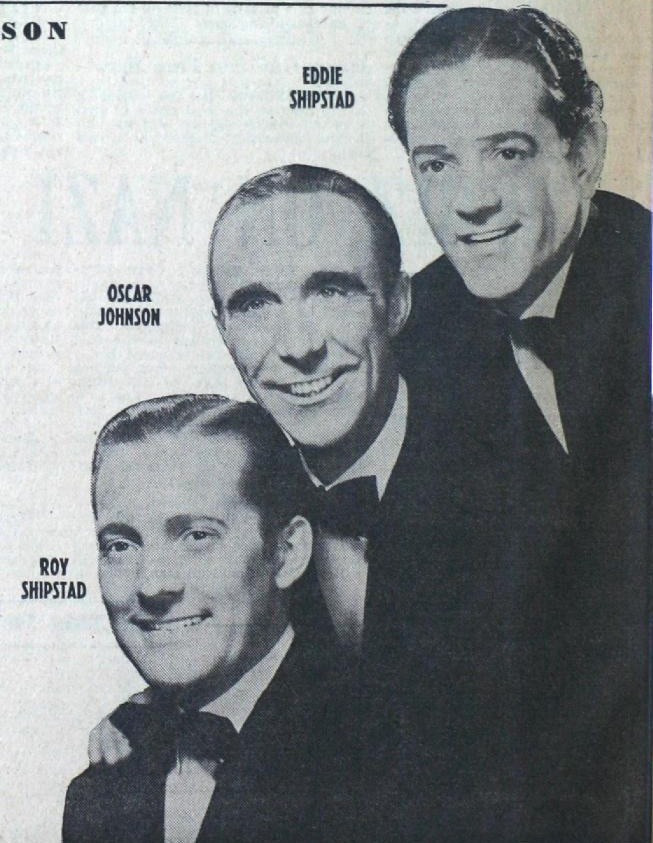
Ice Follies founders Roy Shipstad, Oscar Johnson, and Eddie Shipstad

Son of Swedish parents who had immigrated to St. Paul, Minnesota, typewriter salesman Eddie Skeppstedts (later Shipstads) became friends with chemist Oscar Johnson skating at local lakes. They practiced skating stunts together and were hired as halftime entertainment for the local professional hockey team and then for the National Hockey League New York Rangers.

Eddie's brother Roy - himself a successful amateur skater - would later join them to perform charity shows and eventually as the Shipstads & Johnson Ice Follies.

Ice Follies produced the first large scale, professional touring show in Tulsa, Oklahoma, on November 7, 1936. Ice Follies was featured in the Joan Crawford film, The Ice Follies of 1939, MGM's answer to the popular Sonja Henie films of the time. Frick and Frack, the comic skating duo, joined the show in 1939.

In 1946, Ice Follies began co-producing Ice Cycles with Ice Capades. In 1949, Ice Follies left the Ice Cycles show, leaving it under Ice Capades' ownership. In 1950, Roy Shipstad retired from performing and recruited Richard Dwyer to take over his role of "Debonair" as the "Young Debonair". By 1966, "Young" was dropped from the role title that later became "Mr. Debonair". Frack became ill in 1954 ending the duo, but Frick continued at Ice Follies with other partners.

In the mid-1960s, Thomas Scallen took an executive position with Ice Follies which he eventually bought in 1964. The Ice Follies were placed within General Ice Shows, Inc., a subsidiary of Scallen's Medical Investment Corporation. General Shows purchased Holiday on Ice (HoI) by August 1971. After lawsuits filed by HoI's Chaffen and Arthur Wirtz were resolved in August 1971 and February 1976 respectively, Wirtz gained ownership of both shows.

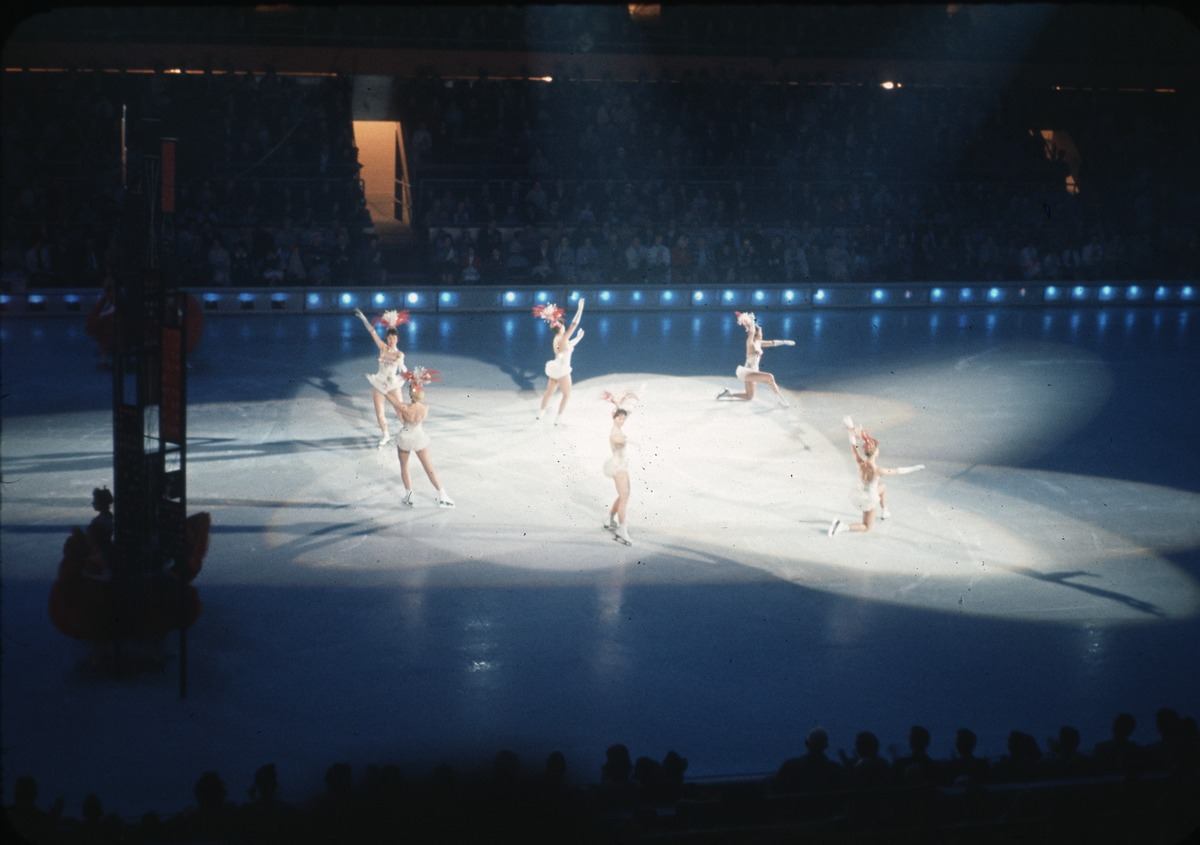
Ice Follies at 1962 World's Fair 02

Mattel's Irvin & Kenneth Feld Productions purchased the Ice Follies and the Holiday on Ice from Wirtz for $12 million in 1979. The company soon approached Disney about doing a Disney-related show on ice.

=== Ice Follies and Holiday on Ice ===
Ice Follies merged with Holiday on Ice in 1980, operating as a combined show in 1980 and 1981. The first Disney's World on Ice began touring in 1981.

Frick suffered a career ending injury in 1980.

In 1995, the company branched out from Disney's World on Ice with The Wizard of Oz on Ice, the first of the Classic Ice Spectaculars. Disney's World on Ice launched its first international tour in 1986 starting in Japan, had five different touring units by 1988, and changed its name in 1998 to "Disney on Ice". The first ice show done in conjunction with 20th Century Fox was Anastasia On Ice starting in 1998.

Ice Follies also expanded to perform Grease on Ice as early as 1999. Based on the Disney Channel original movie, High School Musical was launched as an ice tour in 2006 and lasted three years, despite having been originally expected to last one year.

== Shows ==
- Ice Follies (November 7, 1936—1979)
- Ice Cycles (1946–1949) a melded co-production with Ice Capades, toured smaller North American cities.
- Ice Follies And Holiday on Ice Combined Shows (1980–1981)
- Walt Disney's World on Ice/Disney on Ice series (1981—1998—present)
- Classic Ice Spectaculars, classics on ice
  - The Wizard of Oz on Ice (1995)
  - Grease on Ice (produced with Troika Entertainment)
  - Starlight Express (September 1997—October 1997)
  - Anastasia On Ice (1998–1999) based on Fox's Anastasia animated film
- High School Musical on Ice (2006–2009)
