= Kenneth Feld =

American businessman (born 1948)

- Born: October 31, 1948 (age 78)
- Education: Boston University (BA)
- Occupation: Businessman
- Known for: Owner of Ringling Bros. and Barnum & Bailey Circus & CEO of Feld Entertainment.
- Spouse: Bonnie Turen Feld
- Children: 3
- Parent(s): Adele Feld; Irvin Feld

Kenneth Jeffrey Feld (born October 31, 1948) is the CEO of Feld Entertainment, which operates the Ringling Bros. and Barnum & Bailey Circus, Disney on Ice, Doodlebops Live, Disney Live, Monster Jam, International Hot Rod Association, and AMA Supercross Championship. He is also the producer of several Broadway plays. The business was started by his father Irvin Feld who also promoted Beatles concerts. Ken became CEO of the company upon his father's death in 1984.

== Biography ==
Feld is the son of Adele and Irvin Feld. He graduated from the Boston University School of Management in 1970 with a management degree (Feld is currently a member of the BU Board of Trustees). According to a 2004 article in Forbes magazine, he was worth $775 million and lives in Potomac, Maryland. His mother committed suicide in 1958 so he and his sister Karen were raised by their aunt and uncle.

Irvin Feld bought Ringling Bros. Circus in 1967 for $8 million.

Disney Studio co-produced "Largely New York" with Feld that premiered on May 1, 1989, at St. James Theatre.

In July 2006, he was inducted into the International Circus Hall of Fame.

Clair George has testified in court that he worked as a consultant for Kenneth Feld and the Ringling Brothers and Barnum & Bailey Circus. From 1990 to 1997, he was involved in a program of surveillance, which included wiretapping, directed against Janice Pottker, a journalist who had written about the Feld family, and of various animal rights groups such as PETA and the Performing Animal Welfare Society (PAWS).

In January, 2014 Forbes reported that Feld had become a billionaire. The magazine estimated his stake in the company to be conservatively worth about $1.8 billion after running price-to-sales comparisons with comparable companies.

Feld is the world’s second circus industry billionaire after Cirque du Soleil’s Guy Laliberte, whose net worth Forbes also estimated to be $1.8 billion. In 2009, the Feld Family Foundation pledged $10 million to Boston University.

== Personal life ==
He is married to Bonnie Turen, who is also Jewish. They have three daughters: Nicole Feld, Alana Feld, and Juliette Feld. All three of his daughters work at Feld Entertainment: Nicole Feld produces the Ringling Bros. and Barnum & Bailey Circus shows; Alana Feld is executive vice president and producer of Feld Entertainment's stage shows; and Juliette Feld is chief operating officer of Feld Entertainment.
