= Feld Entertainment =

American live show production company

Feld Entertainment Inc.
- Type: Private
- Industry: Entertainment
- Predecessor: Ringling Brothers-Barnum & Bailey Combined Shows Inc.
- Founders: Irvin Feld; Israel Feld; Roy M. Hofheinz
- Headquarters: Feld Entertainment Studio, Ellenton, Florida, United States
- Number of locations: 4
- Area served: International
- Key people: Kenneth Feld; (Chairman); Juliette Feld (CEO); Steve Yaros (president)
- Products: Live shows
- Production output: Live arena shows
- Owners: Kenneth Feld (majority); Alana Feld; Juliette Feld; Nicole Feld
- Number of employees: 3,000
- Divisions: Feld Consumer Products live productions
- Subsidiaries: Feld Motor Sports, Inc.; Ice Follies And Holiday on Ice, Inc.; Ringling Brothers-Barnum & Bailey Combined Shows Inc.
- Website: feldentertainment.com

Feld Entertainment Inc. is an American privately held live show production company which owns a number of traveling shows. The company began with the Ringling Bros. and Barnum & Bailey Circus before expanding into additional live events, including Disney On Ice (under license from the Walt Disney Company), Monster Jam, Monster Energy AMA Supercross, the SuperMotocross World Championship and Sesame Street Live (under license from Sesame Workshop). The company is family-owned.

== History ==
In 1967, promoters Irvin Feld and Israel Feld, as well as former Houston, Texas, mayor Roy M. Hofheinz made an offer to purchase the Ringling Bros. and Barnum & Bailey Circus from John Ringling North and other minority shareholders associated with the family. Broadway producers Cy Feuer and Ernest H. Martin sued in December 1967 to stop the sale. Nevertheless, the purchase of the combined circuses from the Ringling and North families to the Feld group took place for $8 million. The company was taken public in 1969. Kenneth Feld joined the business in 1970 after finishing college.

In 1971, the Mattel toy manufacturer purchased the company's outstanding shares in 1971 for $50 million in stock, and Irvin Feld continued in his role as manager and producer of the circus. After Walt Disney World opened near Orlando, Florida, in 1971, Mattel attempted to cash in on the tourism surge by opening Circus World in nearby Haines City. Irvin & Kenneth Feld Productions in 1979 purchased from Chicago-based Bill Wirtz the Holiday on Ice and Ice Follies for $12 million. The company soon approached Disney about doing a Disney show on ice. By 1980, the company produced 10 circus and ice show TV specials. An investment was also made in Barnum, the Broadway musical. In 1981, Ken Feld started the Beyond Belief show at the New Frontier Hotel and Casino.

The Felds bought the company back in 1982 for $22.8 million. By then, the business included Holiday on Ice, Ice Follies, Walt Disney's World On Ice, and Beyond Belief starring Las Vegas magicians Siegfried and Roy. Circus World was sold to Arizona developer James Monaghan in 1984. Ringlings' third touring company, Gold Unit, premiered on July 1, 1988, in Japan and the smaller production, which later toured on trucks, was eventually routed into towns that were too small for the larger circus units. In late 1988, Beyond Belief began an international tour, which included New York's Radio City Music Hall and venues in Japan.

=== Feld Entertainment ===
In October 1996, Irvin & Kenneth Feld Productions, Inc. changed its name to Feld Entertainment, Inc. In 2001, Ken Feld began gifting shares of Feld Entertainment to his three daughters Nicole, Alana and Juliette Feld. Nicole was hired into the family business in 2001 and became the first female producer of the Ringling Bros. Circus in 2004. Alana also signed on in 2003.

Due to an accident in October 2003, the Siegfried & Roy show was closed at the Mirage Hotel. The following June, Feld Entertainment began producing Disney Live! with a Winnie the Pooh live show in the United Kingdom. Alana produced the first Doodlebops Live! in 2006. In 2006, Nicole was a vice president in charge of the circus. The company sold its Vienna, Virginia headquarters in May 2006 to America's Capital Partners then leased it back until 2018. In 2007, Nicole and Alana were elevated to executive vice president of the company.

The company signed a 10-year agreement with Disney Live Family Entertainment for Disney On Ice, Disney Live and other Disney productions in August 2008. In September, Feld also acquired the motorsports division of Live Nation, including the properties of Monster Jam (and several associated monster trucks), Supercross, Arenacross, and the IHRA. The motor sport division was renamed Feld Entertainment Motor Sports. Feld Motor Sports launched its first new arena-based freestyle motocross touring production, Nuclear Cowboyz, in 2010. Feld Motor Sports sold the IHRA to IRG Sports + Entertainment in 2012.

Feld Entertainment and Zignia Live, management company of Arena Ciudad de Mexico and Arena Monterrey, signed a promotion agreement in April 2011 which brought various Feld productions to Zingia's managed arenas for a total of 18 weeks. Among the shows that toured Mexico was Ringling Bros. and Barnum & Bailey which returned in May 2012 after an absence of ten years.

In January 2012, the company purchased Palmetto Corporate Center, a former Siemens Corp. complex in Ellenton, Florida, and over a five-year period moved most of its operations and world headquarters, as well as its production center, to the complex. Feld Entertainment also occupies a 241,457-square-foot warehouse in the Baltimore-Washington Industrial Park, Jessup, Maryland where it stores and distributes merchandise and souvenirs for its various productions. In 2015, Feld Motor Sports HQ moved from Illinois to Ellenton.

In March 2013, Feld agreed with Marvel Entertainment, which was acquired by The Walt Disney Company in 2009, to produce Marvel Universe Live!, a Marvel character-based live arena show. Marketing campaign company Cimarron Group was hired in 2013 by Feld Entertainment for all media campaign for Marvel Live and other Feld shows. The Cimarron Group however shut down August 2013.

Juliette Feld was promoted to chief operating officer of the family-owned business in February 2016. In November 2016, Feld Entertainment and Sesame Workshop announced an agreement for a new Sesame Street Live show to debut in October 2017 to replace one by VStar Entertainment Group ending in July 2017.

Citing low attendance rates and high operating costs, Feld Entertainment announced the Ringling Bros. and Barnum & Bailey Circus would close after their final performance on May 21, 2017. The retirement of the elephants was a factor in the decreased attendance, but the company would continue operating its Center for Elephant Conservation. The newly "reimagined" circus opened in Bossier City, Louisiana on September 29, 2023, but without any animal acts.

In 2018, Feld Entertainment and Universal Brand Development agreed to develop multiple properties into mobile pop-up attractions.

== Units ==
Feld Entertainment owns:

- Feld Consumer Products, concession and merchandising division in Jessup, Maryland
- Feld Motor Sports, Inc.
  - Monster Jam
  - AMA Supercross Championship
  - SuperMotocross World Championship
  - International Hot Rod Association Nitro Jam (2008–2012)
  - Nuclear Cowboyz (2010–2013)
- Hagenbeck–Wallace, Inc., a property, costume and scenic design company
- Ice Follies And Holiday on Ice, Inc. produces:
  - Disney on Ice, originally Walt Disney's World on Ice
  - Classic Ice Spectaculars
- Ringling Bros. and Barnum & Bailey Circus (1967–2017, 2023–)

== Live show productions ==
=== Disney Live! ===
- Winnie the Pooh (June 2004–2005) United Kingdom, Spain, The Netherlands, Australia and New Zealand (July 29, 2005–2006) USA (2006–) Japan
- Mickey’s Magic Show
- Playhouse Disney / Disney Junior Live:
  - Playhouse Disney Live on Tour! (launched August 25, 2007) focuses on Mickey Mouse Clubhouse, Little Einsteins, Handy Manny and My Friends Tigger & Pooh characters of Playhouse Disney shows and produced by Ken and Alana Feld.
  - Mickey's Rockin' Road Show was created in early 2009 and is on its second tour starting in July 2010. The show has 15-minute interactive pre-show segment, Playhouse Disney Pre-Show Party, with video highlights.
  - Pirate & Princess Adventure features Sofia the First and Jake and the Never Land Pirates
- Three Classic Fairy Tales (opened May 2008 in China)
- Mickey's Music Festival
- Mickey and Minnie’s Doorway to Magic (Brazil: April 2015–2016) (US: Early 2016–) The show is directed and choreographed by Fred Tallaksen and produced by Alana Feld.

=== Others ===
- Doodlebops Live! (2006–)
- High School Musical Summer Celebration (2009–)
- Marvel Universe Live! (July 10, 2014 – June 2024)
- George Lucas' Super Live Adventure, premiere in Yokohama, Japan on April 27, 1993 with a 22-week tour there. "Willow," "American Graffiti," the Indiana Jones series, "Tucker" and the "Star Wars" movies were all included in the story.
- Goosebumps–Live on Stage
- Disney's Phineas and Ferb: The Best Live Tour Ever! (August 2011 – February 2013)
- Sesame Street Live (October 2017 – February 2023)
  - Sesame Street, Beaches Resorts
  - Sesame Street, SeaWorld theme parks
  - Sesame Street, Sesame Place in Middletown Township, PA and Chula Vista, CA.
- Jurassic World Live Tour (September 2019 – 2024) started in Columbus, Ohio moved across part of the Midwest and East Coast

=== Pop-up attractions ===
- DreamWorks Trolls: The Experience (New York: October 22, 2018)

=== Theatrical ===
(most on Broadway):

- Big
- Barnum
- Largely New York
- Fool Moon
- MADhattan in Las Vegas
- Three Musketeers musical (1984)
