= Cap Curtis =

American circus superintendent and inventor (1873–1955)

- Born: William Hanford Curtis; December 10, 1873; Hazlehurst, Mississippi, U.S.
- Died: April 9, 1955; Cuevas, Mississippi, U.S.
- Occupation: Circus superintendent
- Employer(s): Sells Floto Circus (1909-1916); Hagenbeck–Wallace Circus (1917-1929); Ringling Bros. and Barnum & Bailey Circus (1939-1943)
- Awards: Circus Hall of Fame (1961); Circus Ring of Fame (1984)

William Hanford Curtis (December 10, 1873 – April 9, 1955), nicknamed "Cap", was an American circus superintendent and inventor. Curtis was inducted into the Circus Hall of Fame in 1961.

== Early life ==
William Hanford "Cap" Curtis was born on a farm near Hazlehurst, Mississippi, on December 10, 1873.

== Career ==
William H. Curtis first encountered circuses at the Welch Show in Hazlehurst. He left Copiah County, Mississippi, around 1889-90 to join the Charles Andress Circus in New Orleans, where he worked with Shetland ponies. After moving from W. H. Harris' Nickel-Plate Shows to Sells Brothers Circus in 1891, he became boss hostler for a six-horse team.

In 1892, he rejoined the Harris shows as first assistant on the big top. His career in circus canvas began as an assistant "boss canvasman," where he learned the workings of many shows and commanded the crews who handled the tents. When the tour in New York State faced days of rain near Binghamton, New York, Curtis folded canvas in knee-deep mud.

Cap Curtis's early circus years took him to the shows of Walter L. Main, Adam Forepaugh, Pawnee Bill, and Joseph T. McCaddon in 1893–94, then Forepaugh-Sells Brothers' Circus and Great Wallace in 1895. From 1896 through 1902 he moved among shows such as J. H. LaPearl, Sipe, Doleman & Blake, Harry Long, Sells & Gray, W. R. Reynolds, Bob Hunting, Sparks, and M. L. Clark. In Texas, where circus men often fought townspeople, Curtis was struck by a bullet he carried for life. He went on to stay with the John Robinson Circus from 1902 until 1907.

During the first quarter of the century, he became noted for his innovations and designs of circus equipment. He developed several safety devices and invented time-and-money-saving equipment for circus use. While working with John Robinson, Curtis introduced trussed seats that improved the safety of the audience, a design later adopted by other traveling shows.

Leaving the Robinson show in 1907, he set up the Coney Island Hippodrome in 1908, complete with a rail spur. At the Coney Island Hippodrome, he presented a brewery-backed tent show featuring 100 girls. It folded in New York, and his plan to reuse the equipment for the John Robinson Circus in Cincinnati failed when the harness went missing.

Going to Sells Floto Circus, he was general superintendent from 1909 through 1916. He began building various circus wagons including baggage, cage, seat, and spool wagons. Cap Curtis completed his first patented seat wagons in 1910, creating the first portable circus grandstands, and also became the first to move circus wagons using a motor vehicle. By 1915, the Sells Floto superintendent secured a patent for a canvas spool-wagon that reduced the time needed to take down the tent canvas and simplified putting it up again.

He moved to Hagenbeck–Wallace Circus in 1917. While there, he designed and developed a group of folding seat wagons, which were patented in 1919. Among his designs, Cap Curtis created a 12-foot cage wagon for Hagenbeck–Wallace, initially white and numbered 50, and also made 15-foot cage wagons with three arches.

W. H. Curtis, general superintendent at Hagenbeck until 1929, introduced a system for raising all big top center poles at once and a guying method to prevent them from falling. He built various circus wagons at Peru and West Baden, Indiana. His seat wagons were last used in 1926, and plans for their return ended after the Wall Street crash of 1929 ended Ringling's expansion ideas.

Curtis spent 1930 and 1931 with the Al G. Barnes Circus, 1932 with Sells Floto Circus, and 1933 at A Century of Progress. He rejoined Al G. Barnes from 1934 to 1938, and from 1939 to 1943 was with Ringling Bros. and Barnum & Bailey Circus. He worked as superintendent of Zack Terrell's Cole Bros. Circus from 1943 to 1947.

He had bought a 200-acre pecan grove, producing the most desired pecans in the state. His innovations in grafting and pollination made his crops and seedlings the most valued. He cultivated 400 prize pecan trees, using buds and grafts from a $5,000 specimen on native saplings. Both hobby and business, his grafting produced curiosities like a tree with eight different varieties. He also invented special equipment for his ranch.

In 1947, after John and Henry Ringling North regained control of the Ringling Bros. and Barnum & Bailey Circus, they invited Cap back as general superintendent. He returned to Ringling in 1948, left the road in 1949, returned in 1950 for a brief Cole Bros. tour, and worked the pecan ranch in 1951. He began working as lot superintendent for Royal American Shows in 1952.

He spent weeks with Mills Bros. Circus and later, in September 1953, worked his last big top job as "boss canvasman" when Hershey, Pennsylvania borrowed a Ringling Brothers' tent for President Eisenhower's birthday.

== Death ==
William H. Curtis died near Cuevas, Mississippi, on April 9, 1955, at age 82.

== Legacy ==
In a career that began in 1890, "Cap" Curtis spent 65 years working with traveling shows. Curtis gained fame in his era as "the circus engineer," with his work highlighted by Courtney Ryley Cooper in widely read publications.

The triple-stake driver represented Curtis's most important invention, building on the single-stake driver he created fifteen years before.

He was inducted into the Circus Hall of Fame's "Maintenance" category in 1961 and the Circus Ring of Fame in 1984.
