= Tillie (elephant) =

Circus elephant

- Sex: Female
- Died: 1932 (age 65); Terrace Park, Ohio
- Occupation: Circus performer
- Employer: John Robinson Circus

Tillie with an injured leg (1910)

Tillie (circa 1870 – 1932) was a female Asian elephant that was the mascot of the John Robinson Circus. Tillie was acquired by John Robinson, owner of the circus, in 1872. She was the leader of the elephant pack. Tillie was one of four elephants that the Robinsons kept when they sold the Robinson Circus in 1912.

Tillie's image is shown on the cover Phillip J. Nuxhall's book Stories from the Grove, and she can be seen in a poster on page 76 of Dann Woellert's book Cincinnati's Northside Neighborhood.

When the circus performed in the neighborhood of Northside, Cincinnati (formerly Cumminsville, Ohio), Tillie led the procession.

The T-shaped window on the old Robinson property in Terrace Park is for Tillie.

== Death ==
A full page obituary was published in The Cincinnati Enquirer when Tillie died in 1932. An audience of two thousand commemorated her life in Terrace Park at her home on Elm Avenue in Terrace Park, Ohio as planes dropped carnations and the remaining three elephants stood by as a cannon was fired.

Exactly where Tilles is buried is uncertain. Rumors that she was buried in Spring Grove Cemetery have not been substantiated. Although there is a tombstone for Tillie on the Robinson's old property in Terrace Park, Lynn Nelson, who was a 30-year resident of Terrace Park, insists Tille is not buried under the tombstone, but is instead buried in a dry well on the same property.

Nuxhall and Nelson both believe her legs were cut off and made into umbrella stands.

== See also ==
- List of individual elephants

== Resources ==
- Purcell, Erin. "The Robinson Circus". tphistoricalsociety.org. Terrace Park Historical Society.
- "Entry for Address: 1 Circus Place. Building Name: Robinson Circus House". Terrace Park Building Survey. Terrace Park Woman's Club.
