= The Circus in Winter =

2004 book by Cathy Day

- Fist edition
- Author: Cathy Day
- Cover artist: Vaughn Andrews (design); Jonathan Blair (photographer)
- Language: English
- Publisher: Harcourt
- Publication date: 1 May 2004
- Publication place: United States
- Media type: Print
- Pages: 274
- ISBN: 0-15-101048-X

The Circus in Winter is the debut novel/short story collection by American author Cathy Day published in 2004. It was a runner up in the inaugural Story Prize. and a finalist for the GLCA New Writers Award and the Great Lakes Book Award.

== Inspiration ==
The book comprises connected tales about the fictional "Great Porter Circus", which made its winter home in the "Lima, Indiana", which stood in for the author's home town of Peru, Indiana. The author is the great-niece of Henry Hoffman, an elephant trainer of the Hagenbeck-Wallace Circus who was killed by an elephant in 1901.

== Plot ==
Display No. 1: WALLACE PORTER - or What It Means to See the Elephant
Wallace Porter from Lima, Indiana ran a large livery stable. The struggling 'Hollenbach Circus and Menagerie' paused at the town and Wallace decides to buy the circus, which became the Great Porter Circus.

Display No. 2: JENNIE DIXIANNA - or The Secret to the Spin of Death
During the winter months the circus retires to Lima. Jennie Dixianna speciality was the Spanish rope who lured Wallace and became his mistress.

Display No. 3: THE LAST MEMBER OF THE BOELA TRIBE:
Chapter the First - How Boscombe Bowles Went from Honey-bucket Boy to Pinhead
Zip the Pinhead was displayed by P. T. Barnum. Hollenbach asked Boscombe Bowles to pose as a pinhead, starting the Boela tribe. Boscombe then married Pearly the 'Zulu Queen' and had a son named Gordon, royal prince of the Boela Tribe of African Pinheads.

Chapter the Second - How Gordon Bowles Came to Know More Than He Ever Wanted to Know About Elephants
Gordon grew up in the Great Porter Circus, in the spring of 1901, Caesar the elephant broke free, killing the trainer, Hans Hofstadter. The elephant was shot but it was revealed that it was mistreated.

Chapter the Third - How Verna Bowles Learned about the Relative Nature of Beauty and Truth
Verna Bowles was Gordon's daughter, born long after the circus was sold in 1939. She lived in Lima where her father told her about tales of the circus.

Chapter the Last - How Chicky Bowles Avenged Caesar and Found His Place in the World
Chicky was the son of Verna, born a dwarf. He stole Caesar's skull from the town's museum and threw it in the river, to try to bury Caesar's story of killing his trainer. Chick then set off for Gibsonton to be with other dwarves.

Display No. 4: THE CIRCUS HOUSE - or The Prettiest Little Thing in the Whole Goddamn Place
Wallace Porter in 1900 hired the Colonel Ford from P. T. Barnum. Ford's wife wanted to remain in Lima so Wallace agreed that she could live in his old house. Mrs. Ford asked the circus painter to decorate the house with scenes from the circus.

Display No. 5: WINNESAW - or Nothing Ever Stops Happening When It's Over
In 1913 the Winnesaw river floods Lima, killing many animals and also Jennie Dixianna.

Display No. 6: THE LONE STAR COWBOY - or Don't Fence Me In
In 1957 Stella, her husband Wayne and her twin sons Ray and Ricky moved to Lima to Wallace's old house, with its circus themed murals. Stella imagines the pictures on the walls coming to life. Then tragedy strikes as Ricky accidentally shoots Ray.

Display No. 7: THE JUNGLE GOOLAH BOY:
Preface - So Many Stories Begin Just Like This, on a Ship Sailing to a Place That's Not Yet America
Chapter the First - The Jungle Goolah Boy's Family Tree, According to the Tree's Proprietors
Chapter the Second - The Jungle Goolah Boy's Circus Career, According to the Circus's Proprietors
Chapter the Last - How Sugar Church became the Jungle Goolah Boy - According to his Brother - According to the WPA

Display No. 8: THE KING AND HIS COURT - or Boy Meets Girl, Boy Marries Girl, The End
In 1967 Ethan Perdido was the best baseball player in the state. Ethan was ready to join The King and His Court when his girlfriend Laura Hofstadter became pregnant. He proposes to her and he decides to join the family Funeral Parlour business in Lima where Laura toys with disappearing to Chicago.

Display No. 9: BOSS MAN - or The Gypsies Appear and Poof! They're Gone
Earl Richards is to become the new manager of the KOA Kampgrounds in Lima, but when the gypsies arrive they cause problems...

Display No. 10: THE BULLHOOK
Ollie was born in a blizzard in 1900, the son of Hans Hofstadter the elephant trainer. He married Mildred and they had a daughter Laura, but their marriage was not a happy one, and later Laura disappeared.

Display No. 11: THE CIRCUS PEOPLE - or WMLA, Your Hometown Music Station, 1060 on the AM Dial
Jenny returns to Lima for her grandfather Ollie's funeral, where her father Ethan runs the Funeral Parlour.

== Reception ==
- The Library Journal notes that "Meticulously researched and graced with a dozen lovely black-and-white historical circus photographs, Day's portrayal of life under and outside the big top is accomplished."
- Kirkus Reviews comments: "Funny and tough-minded, yet tender and touched with magic: this is a real find."
- B. J. Sedlock in the Historical Novel Society writes "Day was born in Peru, Indiana, which was a real-life winter home for circuses, and is the descendant of circus folk, which gives the tales an authentic atmosphere. The overall mood is rather somber, a contrast to the festive connotation of the word "circus". The circus brings the characters together in one way or another, but the circus theme is secondary to Day's biography of an unusual small town. She sums up the book thus: "There are basically two kinds of people in the world: town people and circus people. The kind who stay are town people, and the kind who leave are circus people." Memorable characters and striking word-pictures will stay with the reader long after the book is finished."

== Musical ==
The novel was adapted into a musical in 2011 by students at Ball State University by Hunter Foster and Beth Turcotte, with music and lyrics by Ben Clark, and was first performed at the Circus Hall of Fame in Peru, Indiana, and went on to play at Drury Lane Theatre, Chicago. In 2014, Goodspeed Musicals launched a full production of the musical.
