= TPHS =

TPHS may refer to:

- Transactions of the Philological Society (TPhS), a linguistics journal
- Terrace Park High School, Terrace Park, Ohio, United States
- Terry Parker High School, Jacksonville, Florida, United States
- Tinley Park High School, Tinley Park, Illinois, United States
- Torrey Pines High School, San Diego, California, United States
- The Ponds High School, The Ponds, New South Wales
