= Lucia Zora =

American circus animal trainer (1877–1936)

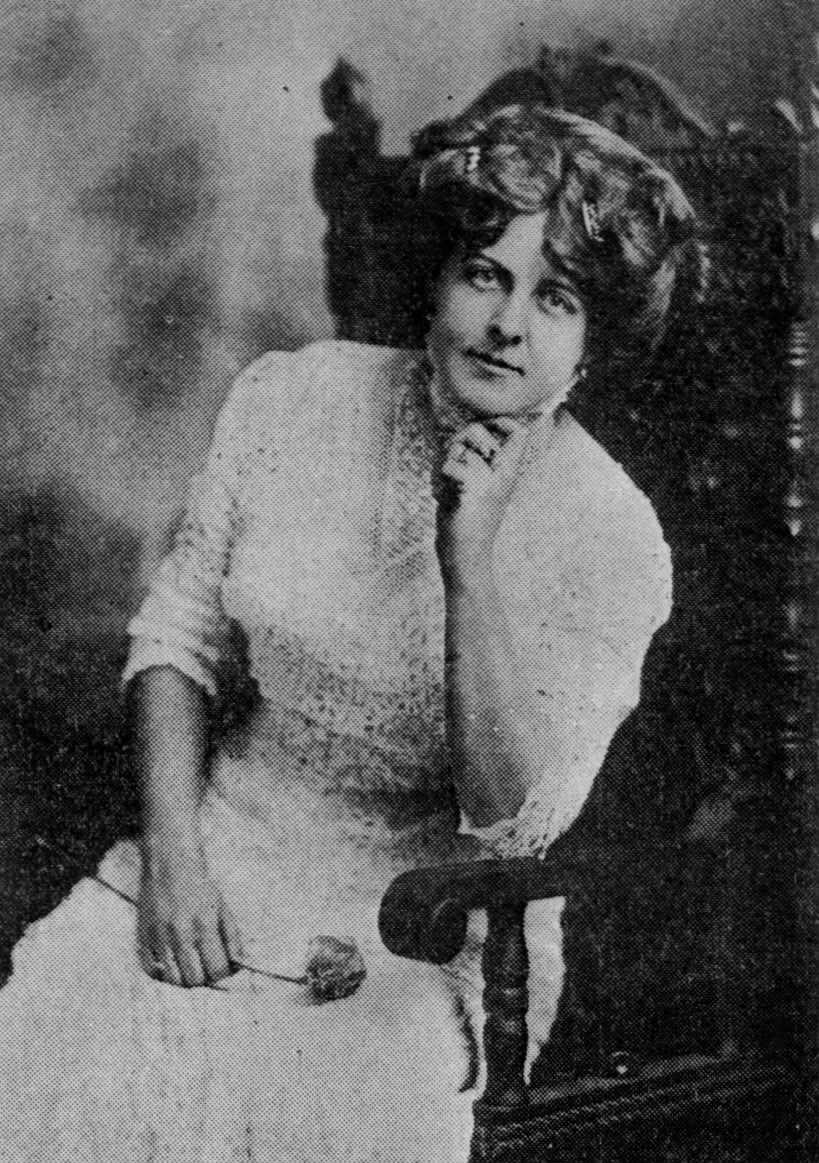
- Born: Lucia Zora Card; May 28, 1877; Cazenovia, New York, U.S.
- Died: November 11, 1936 (aged 59); Fort Pierce, Florida, U.S.
- Resting place: Riverview Memorial Park
- Other names: "The Bravest Woman In The World"
- Occupations: Animal trainer; performer
- Years active: 1903–1917
- Employer: Sells-Floto Circus
- Known for: Animal training
- Father: Milton E. Card
- Awards: Circus Hall of Fame (1962)

Lucia Zora (born Lucia Zora Card; May 28, 1877 – November 11, 1936) was an American animal trainer and circus performer. She was inducted into the Circus Hall of Fame in 1962.

== Early life and education ==
Lucia Zora Card was born on May 28, 1877, in Cazenovia, New York.

She entered the world as the only child of Milton and Myra Card. Lucia Zora received her name from a tramp steamer her father saw in Boston Harbor. As Lucia studied at the Cazenovia Seminary, her parents moved south in 1882 to Fort Pierce, Florida, and established a pineapple plantation along the Indian River. Her father became a prominent pineapple grower.

== Career ==
Her upbringing and education, guided by her parents, focused on preparing her for the opera. While traveling north, Lucia Zora visited Jacksonville with her mother, where she auditioned for the Wilbur Opera Company and remained with it until 1902.

In 1903, at age 19, she left opera behind and joined a circus that later folded in 1904. To support herself, she flipped flapjacks in a restaurant window until she could rejoin another circus.

== Circus life ==
In 1904, she was hired by Sells Floto Circus, based in Denver, Colorado. She performed in the ballet, rode in the grand entrée, appeared as a background performer, and managed the lesson horses, with hopes of advancing to animal handling.

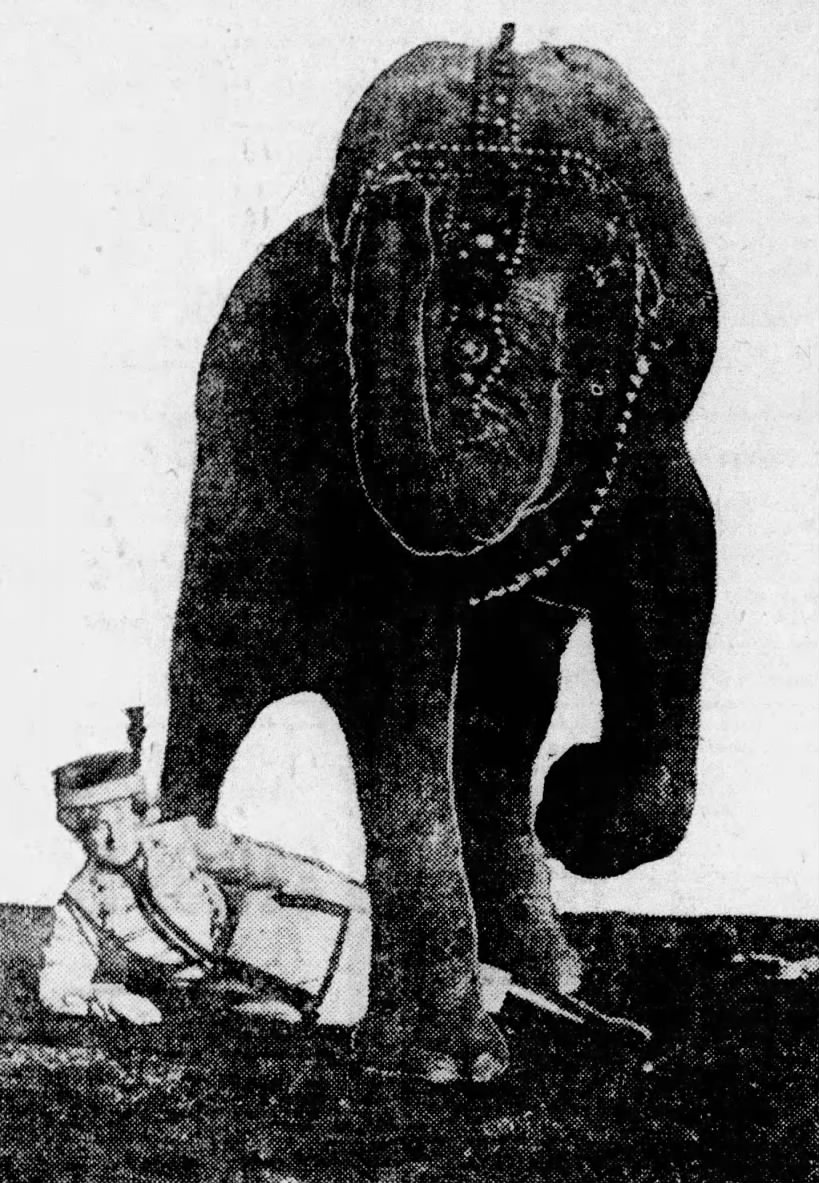
Lucia Zora and a trained elephant, c. 1917

After a year with Sells Floto Circus, Lucia Zora received her long-deferred opportunity to handle wild animals through the circus's newly appointed menagerie superintendent, Fred Alispaw (Alispach). Fred was an elephant trainer from the Hagenbeck gardens in Europe. Her interest in animals sparked a friendship between her and Fred. Afterward, she married him and began her training in animal handling. The menagerie superintendent personally trained Lucia and incorporated her into the dangerous elephant act. Performing in a forty-foot ring, she directed a small herd of large elephants through dancing lessons. The Sells Floto Circus claimed to have the world's most extraordinary collection of trained elephants. She was noted in 1912 for her ability "to handle the big beasts as well as Carl Hagenbeck or any of the famous trainers of the other sex."

Two years into her circus career, Lucia Zora rose to stardom for her fearless handling of various wild animals. She stepped up to tame a mix of lions and other big cats when owner Harry Heye Tammen decided to add a lion and tiger act. During her debut, Zora was enclosed in a 12-foot ring with tigers, equipped only with a chair, whip, and a blank-loaded .32 revolver. Fred had guards with pitchforks on standby. Despite sustaining several wounds, she took charge by the end of two hours. After testing her approach with lions, she succeeded in keeping both rival species caged together. She was billed the "Bravest woman in the world".

When the Sells Floto Circus merged with Buffalo Bill's Wild West in 1915, Lucia Zora remained an active elephant trainer and lion tamer. She trained lions and tigers and handled three herds of elephants in the same ring as one of the main attractions. One of the biggest elephants in captivity, Snyder, balanced her on his tusks and learned to stand on his hind legs. She also taught him to walk the length of the Big Top while balancing her. Snyder became unmanageable following the Alispaws' retirement and was ultimately put down.

By 1917, she had become the circus's leading animal trainer. At the height of her popularity in December 1917, the circus couple decided to retire from the circus industry. She spent time pioneering in the snow-capped mountains along the Great Divide in northwestern Colorado. Later, she and Fred settled in Fort Pierce, Florida in 1926 to care for her sick mother.

== Personal life ==
Her husband was Fred Alispaw (Alispach) of Payson, Utah, who was a circus elephant trainer.

Following her retirement, she settled in a home a few miles south of Fort Pierce.

== Death ==
Lucia Zora Alispaw died in Fort Pierce, on November 10, 1936, aged 59.

Buried alongside her parents in the Card family plots, Lucia Zora's was interred at Riverview Memorial Park in Fort Pierce. Her grave was unmarked from her death in 1936 until a new marker was unveiled on April 24, 2017.

== Legacy ==
Her daring animal performances entertained hundreds of thousands of people.

She became known as the only female elephant trainer in the world. The big-cat trainer was considered the first to combine lions and Bengal tigers together in one cage. Lucia Zora received congratulatory letters from Carl Hagenbeck for her work with wild animals and was regarded by 1917 as an authority on pachyderms in America. She trained elephants without ever resorting to a bull hook, a rare approach at the time.

She released Sawdust and Solitude, her autobiography edited by Courtney Ryley Cooper, in 1928.

Lucia Zora was inducted into the International Circus Hall of Fame in 1962.
