= Hagenbeck–Wallace Circus =

American circus

Hagenbeck-Wallace Circus
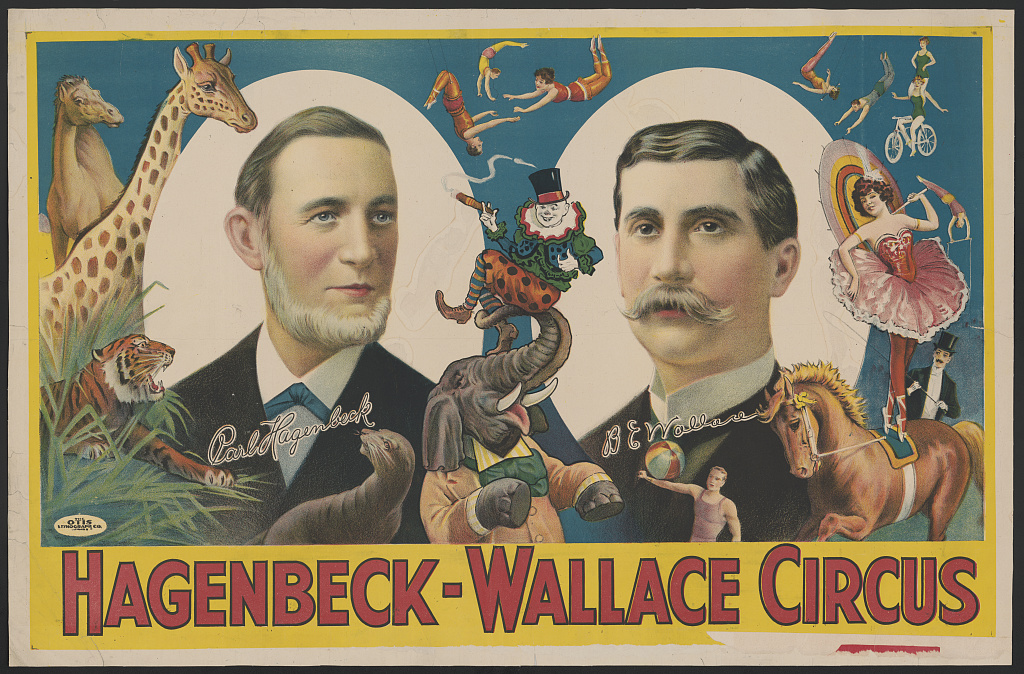

Origin
- Country: United States
- Founder(s): Carl Hagenbeck – Carl Hagenbeck Circus in 1903; Benjamin Wallace – The Great Wallace Show in 1884
- Year founded: Formed in 1907 when Wallace purchased the Carl Hagenbeck Circus and merged it with his circus.

Information
- Operator(s): Benjamin Wallace, Ed Ballard, The American Circus Corporation
- Fate: Ceased operations in 1938.

The Hagenbeck–Wallace Circus was a circus that traveled across America in the early part of the 20th century. At its peak, it was the second-largest circus in America next to Ringling Brothers and Barnum and Bailey Circus. It was based in Peru, Indiana.

== History ==
The circus began as the “Carl Hagenbeck Trained Animal Show” by Carl Hagenbeck (1844–1913). Hagenbeck was an animal trainer who pioneered the use of rewards-based animal training as opposed to fear-based training.

Meanwhile, Benjamin Wallace, a stable owner from Peru, Indiana, and his business partner, James Anderson, bought a circus in 1884 and created "The Great Wallace Show". The show gained some prominence when their copyright for advertising posters was upheld by the Supreme Court in Bleistein v. Donaldson Lithographing Company. Wallace bought out his partner in 1890 and formed the "B. E. Wallace Circus".

In 1907, Wallace purchased the Carl Hagenbeck Circus and merged it with his circus. The circus became known as the Hagenbeck-Wallace circus at that time, even though Carl Hagenbeck protested. He sued to prohibit the use of his name but lost in court.

In March 1913, the circus lost 8 elephants, 21 lions and tigers and 8 performing horses in the Great Flood of 1913. That same year, Wallace sold his interest in the circus to Ed Ballard of French Lick, Indiana.

Another tragedy struck the circus before 4:00 a.m. on June 22, 1918, in the Hammond Circus Train Wreck when the engineer of an empty troop train fell asleep, and collided into the rear of the Hagenbeck-Wallace circus train near Hammond, Indiana. A fire broke out from the kerosene lamps, which were used for lighting in the sleeping cars of the circus train. The fire quickly spread through the wood-constructed cars. As a result of the collision and subsequent fire, 86 persons died and more than 100 were injured. Many victims were burned beyond recognition. Most are buried in Woodlawn Cemetery in Forest Park, Illinois in a section set aside as Showmen's Rest. Only five victims had marked graves; the rest were burned too badly to be identified and buried in unmarked graves.

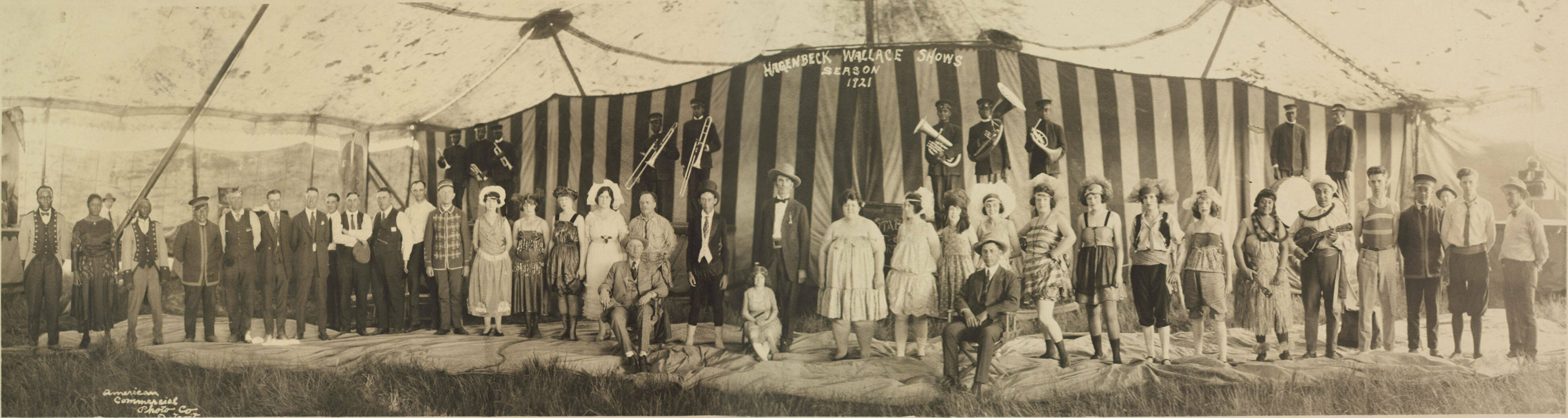
A portrait of the Hagenbeck-Wallace Circus from their 1921 season.

In the spirit of "the show must go on", several competing circuses, including Ringling Brothers and Barnum & Bailey, lent equipment and performers to Hagenbeck-Wallace so that only two performances were canceled as a result of the tragedy, the one in Hammond and the next stop in Monroe, Wisconsin. After the tragedy, circus entrepreneurs Jeremiah Mugivan and Bert Bowers acquired Hagenbeck–Wallace Circus, adding it to a long list of circuses they owned, including Sells-Floto Circus and John Robinson Shows. Mugivan was the chief operations man. A year later, Mugivan and Bowers asked Ballard to join them and the trio formed the American Circus Company.

The successor company of the American Circus Corporation was sold by Jeremiah Mugivan, Bert Bowers and Ed Ballard to John Nicholas Ringling of Ringling Brothers and Barnum & Bailey in 1929 for $1.7 million (US$ 31,900,000 in 2025), along with Al G. Barnes Circus, Sells-Floto Circus, John Robinson Shows, and Sparks Circus.

The circus was leased in 1938 and spent its winter just outside Baldwin Park, California. There, on 35 acres of land, the circus stayed with its huge parade wagons parked alongside a railroad spur. The elephants spent time hauling refuse wagons, shunting railroad cars and piling baled hay. A tent at the eastern edge of the grounds was used by aerialists to practice trapeze and high-wire acts. The circus usually remained there from late November to early spring.

The Great Depression and Ringling's ill health caused the Ringling empire to falter. In 1935, the circus split from Ringling Brothers and Barnum & Bailey and became the Hagenbeck-Wallace and Forepaugh-Sells Bros. Circus. It finally ceased operations in 1938, seventy-nine years before Ringling itself closed.

The complex near Peru that formerly housed the winter home of Hagenbeck-Wallace now serves as the home of the Circus Hall of Fame.

== In fiction ==
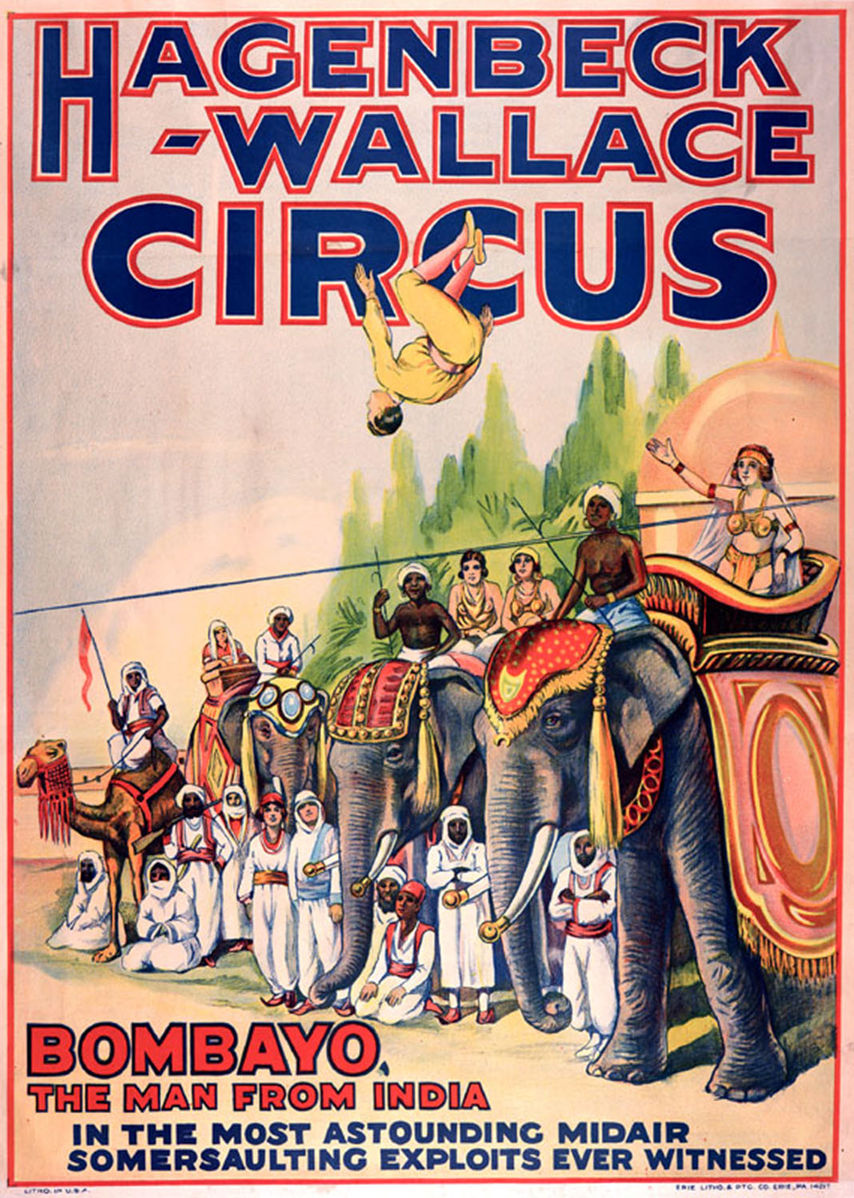
Circus poster featuring Kannan Bombayo, an Indian acrobat and nephew of Keeleri Kunhikannan

The Hagenbeck–Wallace Circus was the inspiration for the novel The Circus in Winter by Cathy Day. The book is about the fictional "Great Porter Circus", which made its winter home in "Lima, Indiana", which stood in for the author's home town of Peru, Indiana. The author is the great-niece of an elephant trainer of the Hagenbeck–Wallace Circus.

Hagenbeck's name also appears in a series of Polish books for teenagers by Alfred Szklarski. The main characters from the books travel around the world to hunt animals for Hagenbeck's circus.

Hagenbeck is also mentioned in the story "First Love" by Samuel Beckett, where the protagonist reminisces about a visit to Ohlsdorf Cemetery. He is also briefly mentioned in the novel, Water for Elephants. by Sara Gruen.

In the fall of 2006 The Neo-Futurists theater company of Chicago mounted an original production entitled Roustabout: The Great Circus Train Wreck! based on the Hagenbeck–Wallace Circus. The play was written by Jay Torrence and directed by Torrence and Kristie Koehler. The show was remounted by the Neo-Futurists in the summer of 2007 at the Chicago Park District's Theater on the Lake. In 2013, a production of the play was presented by Concordia University Chicago. This was followed in 2016 by a production at the University of Wisconsin-Eau Claire, directed by theatre faculty member Arthur Grothe.

== Performers ==
- Clyde Beatty ran away from home in 1921 to join the Howes Great London Circus, as a cageboy and assistant trainer to "Captain" Louis Roth; called the "world's greatest wild animal trainer" by Louis Goebel, the creator of Jungleland USA. When he joined Hagenbeck-Wallace, he learned more from star trainer Peter Taylor. When stricken with a neck injury in 1925, Taylor could not continue his major lion-and-tiger act, and Clyde Beatty took it over at once. With his exciting performing style, he became such a sensation the public filled the tent even during the Depression. He starred with Hagenbeck-Wallace until 1934, when a dispute with Ringling management caused him to sign with a new circus, called the Cole Bros. Circus.
- Joe Skelton, the father of Red Skelton, once worked as a clown in the Hagenbeck–Wallace Circus. Red himself performed with the same circus as a teenager before entering vaudeville.
- Emmett Kelly got his start as "Weary Willie" during the Great Depression with Hagenbeck-Wallace before moving on to other circuses.
- From 1935 till 1937 Maria Rasputin performed with this circus.
- In 1937, cowboy, rodeo performer, and movie actor Hoot Gibson performed with the circus.
- Richard Andeson & his wife Alice Andeson were contortionists
- Tennyson Guyer briefly performed for the circus as a youth.
