= List of United States Supreme Court cases, volume 188 =

Supreme Court of the United States
- Interactive map of Supreme Court of the United States
- 38°53′26″N 77°00′16″W
- Established: March 4, 1789; 236 years ago
- Location: Washington, D.C.
- Coordinates: 38°53′26″N 77°00′16″W
- Composition method: Presidential nomination with Senate confirmation
- Authorised by: Constitution of the United States, Art. III, § 1
- Judge term length: life tenure, subject to impeachment and removal
- Number of positions: 9 (by statute)
- Website: supremecourt.gov

This is a list of cases reported in volume 188 of United States Reports, decided by the Supreme Court of the United States in 1903.

== Justices of the Supreme Court at the time of volume 188 U.S. ==
The Supreme Court is established by Article III, Section 1 of the Constitution of the United States, which says: "The judicial Power of the United States, shall be vested in one supreme Court . . .". The size of the Court is not specified; the Constitution leaves it to Congress to set the number of justices. Under the Judiciary Act of 1789 Congress originally fixed the number of justices at six (one chief justice and five associate justices). Since 1789 Congress has varied the size of the Court from six to seven, nine, ten, and back to nine justices (always including one chief justice).

When the cases in volume 188 were decided the Court comprised the following nine members:

Portrait	Justice	Office	Home State	Succeeded	Date confirmed by the Senate (Vote)	Tenure on Supreme Court
	Melville Fuller	Chief Justice	Illinois	Morrison Waite	July 20, 1888 (41–20)	October 8, 1888 – July 4, 1910 (Died)
	John Marshall Harlan	Associate Justice	Kentucky	David Davis	November 29, 1877 (Acclamation)	December 10, 1877 – October 14, 1911 (Died)
	David Josiah Brewer	Associate Justice	Kansas	Stanley Matthews	December 18, 1889 (53–11)	January 6, 1890 – March 28, 1910 (Died)
	Henry Billings Brown	Associate Justice	Michigan	Samuel Freeman Miller	December 29, 1890 (Acclamation)	January 5, 1891 – May 28, 1906 (Retired)
	George Shiras Jr.	Associate Justice	Pennsylvania	Joseph P. Bradley	July 26, 1892 (Acclamation)	October 10, 1892 – February 23, 1903 (Retired)
	Edward Douglass White	Associate Justice	Louisiana	Samuel Blatchford	February 19, 1894 (Acclamation)	March 12, 1894 – December 18, 1910 (Continued as chief justice)
	Rufus W. Peckham	Associate Justice	New York	Howell Edmunds Jackson	December 9, 1895 (Acclamation)	January 6, 1896 – October 24, 1909 (Died)
	Joseph McKenna	Associate Justice	California	Stephen Johnson Field	January 21, 1898 (Acclamation)	January 26, 1898 – January 5, 1925 (Retired)
	Oliver Wendell Holmes Jr.	Associate Justice	Massachusetts	Horace Gray	December 4, 1902 (Acclamation)	December 8, 1902 – January 12, 1932 (Retired)

== Notable Case in 188 U.S. ==
=== Bleistein v. Donaldson Lithographing Co. ===
The Supreme Court in Bleistein v. Donaldson Lithographing Co., 188 U.S. 239 (1903), via an opinion written by Justice Oliver Wendell Holmes Jr., held that advertisements were protected by copyright. The case is now cited for the proposition that commercial speech can be protected by copyright.

== Citation style ==
Under the Judiciary Act of 1789 the federal court structure at the time comprised District Courts, which had general trial jurisdiction; Circuit Courts, which had mixed trial and appellate (from the US District Courts) jurisdiction; and the United States Supreme Court, which had appellate jurisdiction over the federal District and Circuit courts—and for certain issues over state courts. The Supreme Court also had limited original jurisdiction (i.e., in which cases could be filed directly with the Supreme Court without first having been heard by a lower federal or state court). There were one or more federal District Courts and/or Circuit Courts in each state, territory, or other geographical region.

The Judiciary Act of 1891 created the United States Courts of Appeals and reassigned the jurisdiction of most routine appeals from the district and circuit courts to these appellate courts. The Act created nine new courts that were originally known as the "United States Circuit Courts of Appeals." The new courts had jurisdiction over most appeals of lower court decisions. The Supreme Court could review either legal issues that a court of appeals certified or decisions of court of appeals by writ of certiorari.

Bluebook citation style is used for case names, citations, and jurisdictions.

- "# Cir." = United States Court of Appeals
  - e.g., "3d Cir." = United States Court of Appeals for the Third Circuit
- "C.C.D." = United States Circuit Court for the District of . . .
  - e.g.,"C.C.D.N.J." = United States Circuit Court for the District of New Jersey
- "D." = United States District Court for the District of . . .
  - e.g.,"D. Mass." = United States District Court for the District of Massachusetts
- "E." = Eastern; "M." = Middle; "N." = Northern; "S." = Southern; "W." = Western
  - e.g.,"C.C.S.D.N.Y." = United States Circuit Court for the Southern District of New York
  - e.g.,"M.D. Ala." = United States District Court for the Middle District of Alabama
- "Ct. Cl." = United States Court of Claims
- The abbreviation of a state's name alone indicates the highest appellate court in that state's judiciary at the time.
  - e.g.,"Pa." = Supreme Court of Pennsylvania
  - e.g.,"Me." = Supreme Judicial Court of Maine

== List of cases in volume 188 U.S. ==
Case Name	Page & year	Opinion of the Court	Concurring opinion(s)	Dissenting opinion(s)	Lower Court	Disposition
Kelley v. Rhoads	1 (1903)	Brown	none	none	Wyo.	reversed
Weber v. Rogan	10 (1903)	Brown	none	none	Tex.	dismissed
Andrews v. Andrews	14 (1903)	White	none	none	Mass.	affirmed
Earle v. Carson	42 (1903)	White	none	none	3d Cir.	affirmed
Hale v. Allinson	56 (1903)	Peckham	none	none	Cir.	affirmed
Diamond M. Co. v. Village of Ontonagon	82 (1903)	McKenna	none	none	C.C.W.D. Mich.	affirmed
Billings v. Illinois	97 (1903)	McKenna	none	none	Ill.	affirmed
American C. Co. v. Continental C. Co.	104 (1903)	Holmes	none	none	C.C.N.D. Ill.	reversed
Nelson v. Northern P. Ry. Co.	108 (1903)	Harlan	none	Brewer	Wash.	reversed
Smythe v. United States	156 (1903)	Harlan	none	Peckham	5th Cir.	affirmed
Beals v. Cone	184 (1903)	Brewer	none	none	Colo.	dismissed
Blackstone v. Miller	189 (1903)	Holmes	none	none	N.Y. Cnty. Sur. Ct.	affirmed
Connecticut M.L. Ins. Co. v. Hillmon	208 (1903)	Brown	none	none	8th Cir.	reversed
Easton v. Iowa	220 (1903)	Shiras	none	none	Iowa	reversed
Bleistein v. Donaldson L. Co.	239 (1903)	Holmes	none	Harlan	6th Cir.	reversed
The Manila Prize Cases	254 (1903)	Fuller	none	none	Sup. Ct. D.C.	multiple
The Infanta Maria Teresa	283 (1903)	Fuller	none	Brown	Sup. Ct. D.C.	reversed
Mutual L. Ins. Co. v. McGrew	291 (1903)	Fuller	none	none	Cal.	dismissed
Hooker v. City of Los Angeles	314 (1903)	Fuller	none	none	Cal.	dismissed
Lottery Case	321 (1903)	Harlan	none	Fuller	C.C.N.D. Ill.	affirmed
Francis v. United States	375 (1903)	Holmes	none	Harlan	6th Cir.	reversed
Louisville et al. Co. v. Kentucky I	385 (1903)	Harlan	none	none	Ky.	reversed
Louisville et al. Co. v. Kentucky II	399 (1903)	Harlan	none	none	Ky.	reversed
Bigby v. United States	400 (1903)	Harlan	none	none	C.C.E.D.N.Y.	affirmed
Cummings v. City of Chicago	410 (1903)	Harlan	none	none	C.C.N.D. Ill.	affirmed
Calumet G.E. Co. v. City of Chicago	431 (1903)	Harlan	none	none	C.C.N.D. Ill.	affirmed
United States v. Rickert	432 (1903)	Harlan	none	none	8th Cir.	certification
United States v. Lynah	445 (1903)	Brewer	Brown	White	C.C.D.S.C.	affirmed
United States v. Williams	485 (1903)	Brewer	none	none	C.C.D.S.C.	affirmed
Clarke v. Larremore	486 (1903)	Brewer	none	none	2d Cir.	affirmed
Williams v. Parker	491 (1903)	Brewer	none	none	Mass.	affirmed
Reetz v. Michigan	505 (1903)	Brewer	none	none	Mich.	affirmed
Leach v. Burr	510 (1903)	Brewer	none	none	D.C. Cir.	affirmed
Schaefer v. Werling	516 (1903)	Brewer	none	none	Ind.	affirmed
Tarrance v. Florida	519 (1903)	Brewer	none	none	Fla.	affirmed
Northern P. Ry. Co. v. Soderberg	526 (1903)	Brown	none	none	9th Cir.	affirmed
Prout v. Starr	537 (1903)	Shiras	none	none	C.C.D. Neb.	affirmed
Gutierres v. Albuquerque L. & I. Co.	545 (1903)	White	none	none	Sup. Ct. Terr. N.M.	affirmed
Rankin v. Chase Nat'l Bank	557 (1903)	White	none	none	2d Cir.	reversed
Commercial P. Co. v. Beckwith	567 (1903)	White	none	none	Sup. Ct. N.Y.	affirmed
United States v. Barringer	577 (1903)	White	none	none	Ct. Cl.	reversed
Waggoner v. Flack	595 (1903)	Peckham	none	none	Tex. Civ. App.	affirmed
Helwig v. United States	605 (1903)	Peckham	none	none	2d Cir.	certification
Jaquith v. Rowley	620 (1903)	Peckham	none	none	D. Mass.	affirmed
American I. Co. v. Eastern T. & B. Co.	626 (1903)	Peckham	none	none	D.C. Cir.	affirmed
Boston et al. Co. v. Montana O.P. Co.	632 (1903)	Peckham	none	none	C.C.D. Mont.	affirmed
Winslow v. Baltimore & O.R.R. Co.	646 (1903)	Peckham	none	none	D.C. Cir.	reversed
Chicago T.S. v. Illinois	662 (1903)	Peckham	none	White	Ill.	affirmed
Indiana Mfg. Co. v. Koehne	681 (1903)	Peckham	none	none	C.C.D. Ind.	affirmed
Hyatt v. People ex rel. Corkran	691 (1903)	Peckham	none	none	N.Y.	affirmed
The Mangrove Prize Money	720 (1903)	Holmes	none	none	S.D. Fla.	affirmed
Home L. Ins. Co. v. Fisher	726 (1903)	Holmes	none	none	C.C.N.D. Fla.	affirmed
Kidd v. Alabama	730 (1903)	Holmes	none	none	Ala.	affirmed
Fourth Nat'l Bank v. Albaugh	734 (1903)	Holmes	none	none	8th Cir.	affirmed

== See also ==
- Certificate of division
