= Terrace Park, Ohio =

- Village
- Location in Hamilton County and the state of Ohio
- Coordinates: 39°09′30″N 84°18′40″W
- Country: United States
- State: Ohio
- County: Hamilton

Government
  - Mayor: Thomas Tepe, Jr. (R)

Area
  - Total: 1.24 sq mi (3.21 km^{2})
  - Land: 1.19 sq mi (3.07 km^{2})
  - Water: 0.050 sq mi (0.13 km^{2})
- Elevation: 571 ft (174 m)

Population (2020)
  - Total: 2,355
  - Density: 1,985.2/sq mi (766.48/km^{2})
- Time zone: UTC-5 (Eastern (EST))
  - Summer (DST): UTC-4 (EDT)
- ZIP code: 45174
- Area code: 513
- FIPS code: 39-76428
- GNIS feature ID: 1086233
- Website: www.terracepark.org

Terrace Park is a village in Hamilton County, Ohio, and a suburb of Greater Cincinnati. The population was 2,355 at the 2020 census.

== History ==
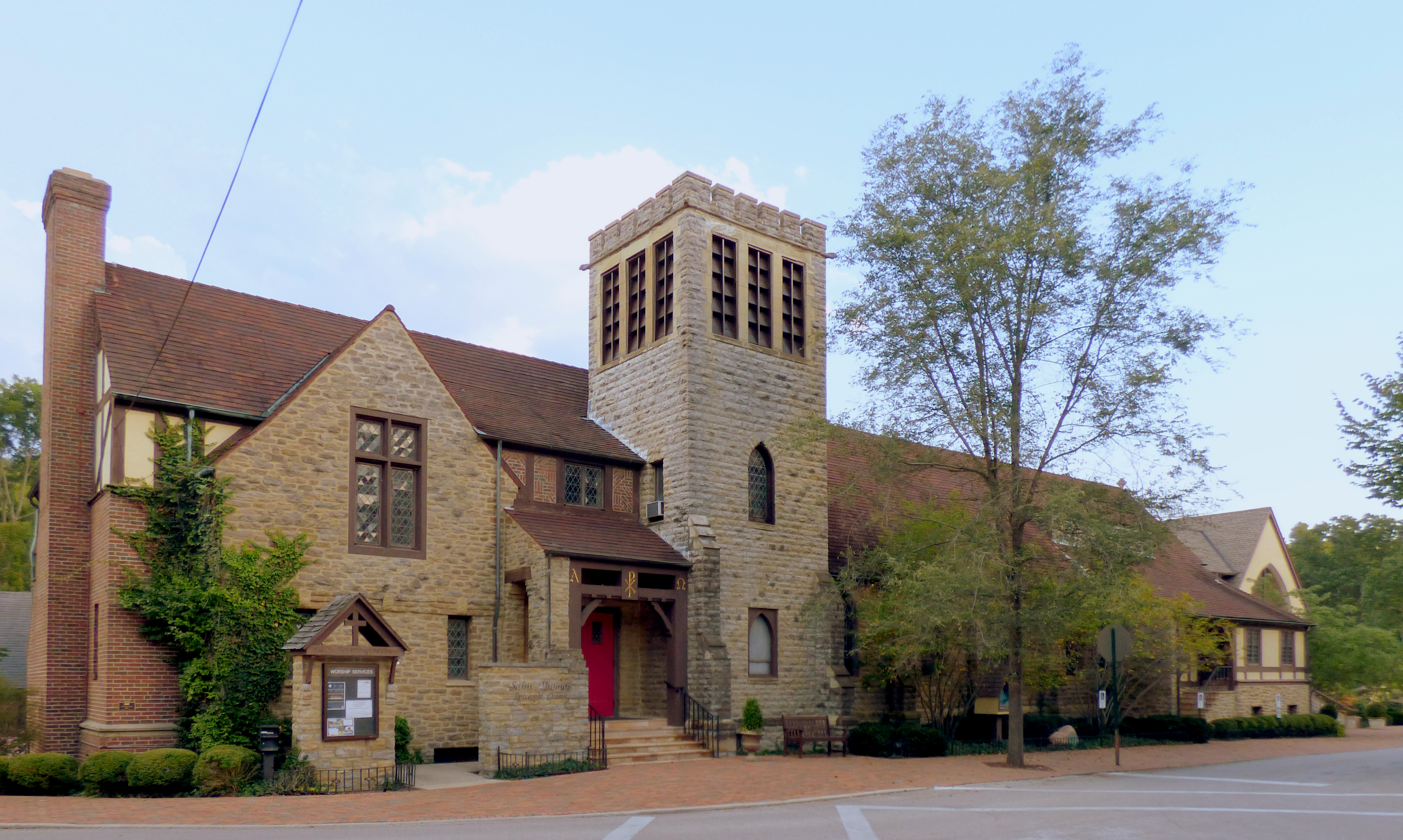
St. Thomas Episcopal Church in Terrace Park

The primary document for the history of Terrace Park is "A Place Called Terrace Park" by Ellis Rawnsley (1992).

Rawnsley notes that the earliest human inhabitants of Terrace Park may have arrived as early as 12,000 years ago—the Paleo-Indians. Although "no traces of established settlements have ever been found," flints showing evidence of these nomadic people have been found in various locations in the areas surrounding Terrace Park.

Circa approximately 1000 B.C., settlements appeared in Hamilton County, Ohio.

According to Rawnsley, "Two thousand or more years ago, a primitive people built, in what is now Terrace Park, one of the largest of its kind of the 295 prehistoric earthworks ever found in Hamilton County."

Mounds from the Adena culture are found throughout a wide area which contains Terrace Park.

In January 1789, Abraham Covalt established a small fortified settlement called Covalt Station in what is now Terrace Park. The area was surrounded by Shawnee settlements, and the Shawnee were hostile towards the white settlement in their midst. Covalt Station had to be abandoned in 1792 due to continuing attacks by the Shawnee, and white settlers only returned after General "Mad Anthony" Wayne defeated the Native American Western Confederacy at the Battle of Fallen Timbers and secured the Treaty of Greenville which ceded all of southern Ohio (and other territory) to the United States. Before roads and railroads connected the village to other nearby settlements, such as Milford, most residents of Terrace Park kept cattle and chickens, and engaged in other agricultural activities for their own subsistence, and had "homesteads" as opposed to the ordered residential village of today.

Terrace Park was incorporated in 1893.

== Geography ==
According to the United States Census Bureau, the village has a total area of 1.22 square miles (3.16 km^{2}), of which 1.17 square miles (3.03 km^{2}) is land and 0.05 square miles (0.13 km^{2}) is water. Terrace Park feeds into the Mariemont City School District, which includes Mariemont High School.

== Demographics ==
Historical population
Census	Pop.	Note	%±
1900	290		—
1910	448		54.5%
1920	410		−8.5%
1930	713		73.9%
1940	858		20.3%
1950	1,265		47.4%
1960	2,023		59.9%
1970	2,266		12.0%
1980	2,044		−9.8%
1990	2,133		4.4%
2000	2,273		6.6%
2010	2,251		−1.0%
2020	2,355		4.6%
U.S. Decennial Census

=== 2020 census ===
As of the census of 2020, there were 2,355 people living in the village, for a population density of 1,985.67 people per square mile (766.48/km^{2}). There were 800 housing units. The racial makeup of the village was 94.2% White, 0.1% Black or African American, 0.1% Native American, 1.1% Asian, 0.1% Pacific Islander, 0.3% from some other race, and 4.2% from two or more races. 2.9% of the population were Hispanic or Latino of any race.

There were 648 households, out of which 50.8% had children under the age of 18 living with them, 81.6% were married couples living together, 5.2% had a male householder with no spouse present, and 11.3% had a female householder with no spouse present. 12.5% of all households were made up of individuals, and 5.9% were someone living alone who was 65 years of age or older. The average household size was 3.10, and the average family size was 3.42.

35.7% of the village's population were under the age of 18, 54.3% were 18 to 64, and 10.0% were 65 years of age or older. The median age was 37.1. For every 100 females, there were 112.7 males.

According to the U.S. Census American Community Survey, for the period 2016-2020 the estimated median annual income for a household in the village was $183,750, and the median income for a family was $191,250. About 0.4% of the population were living below the poverty line, including 0.0% of those under age 18 and 0.0% of those age 65 or over. About 67.1% of the population were employed, and 83.1% had a bachelor's degree or higher.

=== 2010 census ===
As of the census of 2010, there were 2,251 people, 758 households, and 615 families living in the village. The population density was 1,923.9 inhabitants per square mile (742.8/km^{2}). There were 806 housing units at an average density of 688.9 per square mile (266.0/km^{2}). The racial makeup of the village was 98.6% White, 0.1% African American, 0.4% Asian, 0.2% from other races, and 0.7% from two or more races. Hispanic or Latino of any race were 0.8% of the population.

There were 758 households, of which 48.9% had children under the age of 18 living with them, 73.6% were married couples living together, 5.3% had a female householder with no husband present, 2.2% had a male householder with no wife present, and 18.9% were non-families. 16.8% of all households were made up of individuals, and 7.9% had someone living alone who was 65 years of age or older. The average household size was 2.97 and the average family size was 3.38.

The median age in the village was 41.4 years. 35% of residents were under the age of 18; 3.7% were between the ages of 18 and 24; 18.6% were from 25 to 44; 32.3% were from 45 to 64; and 10.5% were 65 years of age or older. The gender makeup of the village was 50.2% male and 49.8% female.

=== 2000 census ===
As of the census of 2000, there were 2,273 people, 760 households, and 646 families living in the village. The population density was 1,889.7 inhabitants per square mile (729.6/km^{2}). There were 794 housing units at an average density of 660.1 per square mile (254.9/km^{2}). The racial makeup of the village was 98.90% White, 0.18% African American, 0.57% Asian, 0.04% from other races, and 0.31% from two or more races. Hispanic or Latino of any race were 0.79% of the population.

There were 760 households, out of which 51.8% had children under the age of 18 living with them, 76.1% were married couples living together, 7.2% had a female householder with no husband present, and 15.0% were non-families. 14.6% of all households were made up of individuals, and 8.7% had someone living alone who was 65 years of age or older. The average household size was 2.99 and the average family size was 3.33.

In the village, the population was spread out, with 35.6% under the age of 18, 3.6% from 18 to 24, 23.8% from 25 to 44, 24.6% from 45 to 64, and 12.4% who were 65 years of age or older. The median age was 39 years. For every 100 females there were 99.9 males. For every 100 females age 18 and over, there were 88.8 males.

The median income for a household in the village was $95,530, and the median income for a family was $104,250. Males had a median income of $72,321 versus $41,500 for females. The per capita income for the village was $42,391. About 1.7% of families and 2.0% of the population were below the poverty line, including 2.7% of those under age 18 and none of those age 65 or over.

== Notable people ==
- Rob Portman, Republican U.S. senator for Ohio (2011-2023)
- John Robinson, famous for founding the John Robinson Circus

=== Notable animal ===
- Tillie (elephant)

== See also ==
- Terrace Park High School
