= Allan Jackson =

American radio broadcaster (1915–1976)

Allan Jackson (December 4, 1915 – April 26, 1976) was an American radio broadcaster. He was the head anchor at CBS Radio News in New York City.

Jackson, born in Hot Springs, Arkansas and an alumnus of the University of Illinois, began his 33-year career during the Second World War, reading the 6:00 PM national evening news (then the network's main news program) and anchoring coverage of many of the major news headlines of the day. He anchored CBS News's coverage of the D-Day invasion on June 6, 1944, of the joining of US and Soviet forces in April 1945, and of V-E Day in May of that year, then the Berlin Airlift in 1948.

Jackson was one of the first national radio newscasters to announce the assassination of John F. Kennedy on November 22, 1963. According to former CBS News Correspondent Dan Rather in his book The Camera Never Blinks and in the 2003 book President Kennedy Has Been Shot, Rather had advised CBS News headquarters in New York from Dallas that there were unconfirmed reports that the President was dead. Jackson was handed a slip of paper reading "JFK DEAD" and immediately went on air with the announcement, reporting Kennedy's death as a fact (which had not yet been confirmed, although it was true that Kennedy was already dead), and playing the U.S. national anthem, The Star-Spangled Banner. He was also the first CBS Radio anchor to announce the landing of Apollo 11 and Neil Armstrong's first steps on the Moon on July 20, 1969.

In 1974, Great Oaks Broadcasting, a company part-owned by Jackson, purchased radio station WAKC in Normal, Illinois. A year later, Jackson retired from CBS to devote himself to the station. After two weeks in a hospital, Jackson died April 26, 1976, of complications following gall bladder surgery. His son, David, was also a correspondent with CBS News.

== Sources ==
- Earth Station 1 coverage of the Kennedy assassination, including clips of Allan Jackson's announcement
  - Real Audio file of the announcement from Earth Station 1
- Link to airchecks of CBS Radio's coverage of the assassinations of President Kennedy and of Robert F. Kennedy in 1968, as heard on WCCO Radio in Minneapolis, Minnesota. Jackson is heard anchoring coverage of both tragedies.
- Dan Rather, The Camera Never Blinks, Ballantine Books, New York, 1978 ISBN 0-345-27423-7
