= Champion v. Ames =

- Supreme Court of the United States

Argued February 27–28, 1901 Reargued October 16–17, 1901 Reargued December 15–16, 1902 Decided February 23, 1903
- Full case name: Charles F. Champion v. John C. Ames, United States Marshal
- Citations: 188 U.S. 321 (more) 23 S. Ct. 321; 47 L. Ed. 492; 1903 U.S. LEXIS 1283

Case history
- Prior: Appeal from the Circuit Court of the United States for the Northern District of Illinois

Holding
- Trafficking lottery tickets constitutes interstate commerce that can be regulated by the U.S. Congress under the Commerce Clause.

Court membership
- Chief Justice Melville Fuller Associate Justices John M. Harlan · David J. Brewer; Henry B. Brown · Edward D. White; Rufus W. Peckham · Joseph McKenna; Oliver W. Holmes Jr.

Case opinions
- Majority: Harlan, joined by Brown, White, McKenna, Holmes
- Dissent: Fuller, joined by Brewer, Shiras, Peckham

Champion v. Ames, 188 U.S. 321 (1903), was a decision by the United States Supreme Court which held that trafficking lottery tickets constituted interstate commerce that could be regulated by the U.S. Congress under the Commerce Clause.

== Background ==
Congress enacted the Federal Lottery Act in 1895, which prohibited the sending of lottery tickets across state lines. The appellant, Charles Champion, was indicted for shipping Paraguayan lottery tickets from Texas to California. The indictment was challenged on the grounds that the power to regulate commerce does not include the power to prohibit commerce of any item.

== Decision of the Supreme Court ==
Most important in this case was that the Supreme Court recognized that Congress' power to regulate interstate traffic is plenary. That is, the power is complete in and of itself. This wide discretion allowed Congress to regulate traffic as it sees fit, within Constitutional limits, even to the extent of prohibiting goods, as here. This plenary power is distinct from the aggregate-impact theories later espoused in the Shreveport line of cases.

The 5–4 decision upholding the statute was authored by Justice John Marshall Harlan. The dissent by Chief Justice Fuller was joined by Justice Brewer, Justice Shiras, and Justice Peckham. They argued that the Tenth Amendment limited Congress' ability to regulate interstate commerce.

== See also ==
- Louisiana State Lottery Company
- Gibbons v. Ogden (1824), the first recognition by the U.S. Supreme Court that Congress' power to regulate interstate commerce is plenary (see Chief Justice Marshall's majority opinion)
- Hammer v. Dagenhart (1918), in which the Court struck down a similar law on the grounds that the federal government could not use its power to regulate interstate commerce to accomplish certain ends
