= Bleistein v. Donaldson Lithographing Co. =

Bleistein v. Donaldson Lithographing Company
- Supreme Court of the United States

Submitted December 13, 1883 Decided February 2, 1903
- Full case name: George Bleistein, et al.. v. Donaldson Lithographing Company
- Citations: 188 U.S. 239 (more) 23 S. Ct. 298; 47 L. Ed. 460; 1903 U.S. LEXIS 1278

Case history
- Prior: Judgment for defendant, Courier Lithographing Co. v. Donaldson Lithographing Co., 104 F. 996 (6th Cir.)

Holding
- Illustrations created primarily for the purpose of advertising are within the protection of copyright.

Court membership
- Chief Justice Melville Fuller Associate Justices John M. Harlan · David J. Brewer; Henry B. Brown · George Shiras Jr. Edward D. White · Rufus W. Peckham; Joseph McKenna · Oliver W. Holmes Jr.

Case opinions
- Majority: Holmes, joined by Fuller, Brown, White, Brewer, Shiras, Peckham
- Dissent: Harlan, joined by McKenna

Laws applied
- U.S. Const. art. I; U.S. Rev. Stat. §§ 4952, 4965 (Copyright Act of 1874)

Bleistein v. Donaldson Lithographing Company, 188 U.S. 239 (1903), is a case in which the United States Supreme Court found that advertisements were protected by copyright. The case is now cited for the proposition that commercial speech can be protected by copyright.

== Facts ==
The named plaintiff was George Bleistein, an employee of the Courier Lithographing Company. The company had been hired by Benjamin Wallace, owner of a traveling circus called the "Great Wallace Show" (which would later become the Hagenbeck-Wallace Circus) to design and produce a number of chromolithographs used to produce posters to promote the circus. The posters featured images from the circus, such as ballet dancers and acrobats. When Wallace ran out of posters, rather than ordering more from the plaintiff, Wallace hired the Donaldson Lithographing Company - a competitor of the plaintiff - to manufacture copies of three of those posters. Courier (and Bleistein, in name) sued Donaldson for copyright infringement. Donaldson objected on the basis that the posters were merely advertisements, and thus should not be considered eligible for copyright protection either under the Constitution of the United States or under the controlling Copyright Act of 1870. The United States Court of Appeals for the Sixth Circuit held that the posters were not amenable to copyright protection, and Courier appealed.

=== The Posters ===
Holmes described the posters as being "of an ordinary ballet", of "the Stirk family, performing on bicycles", and of "men and women whitened to represent statues".

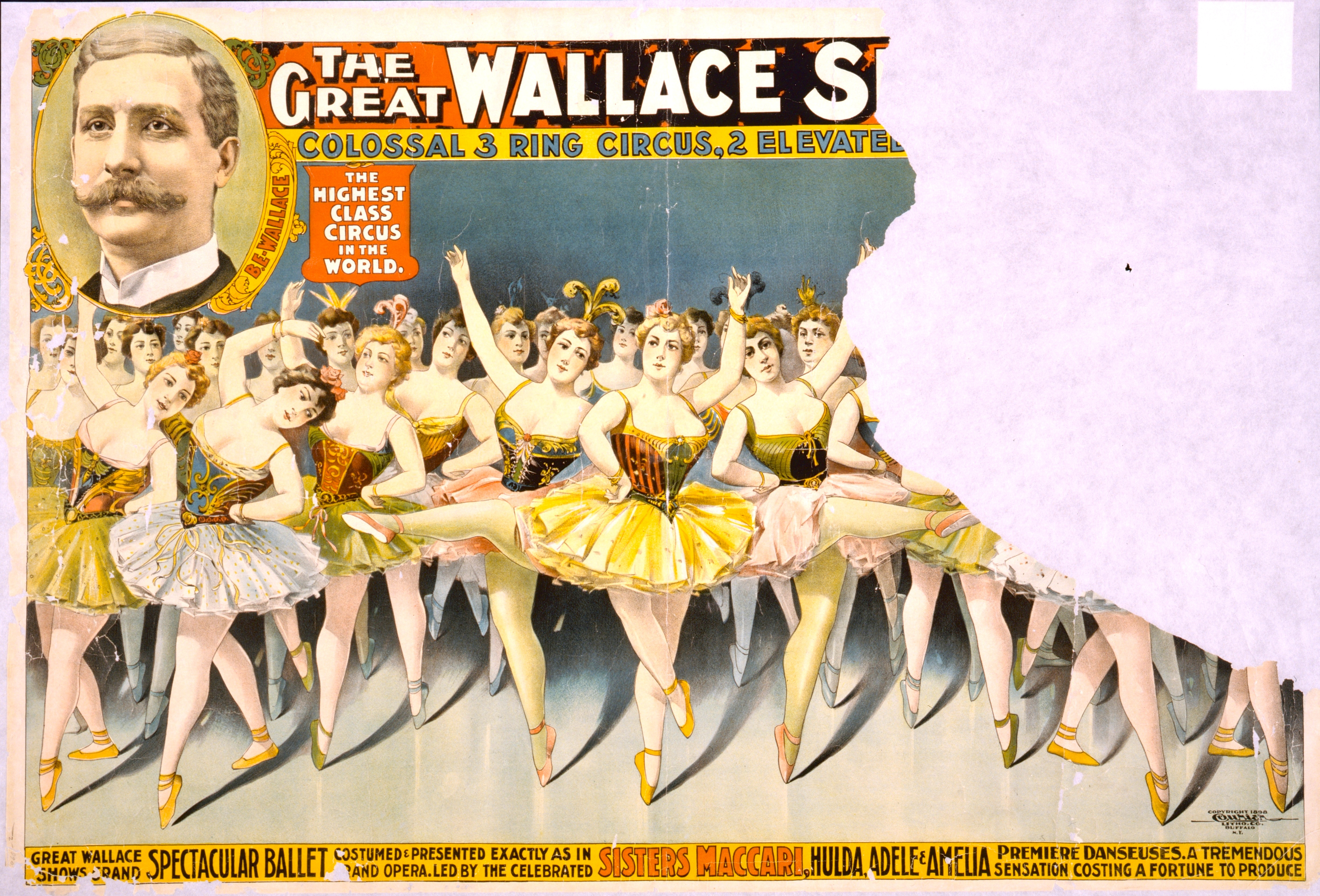
"an ordinary ballet"

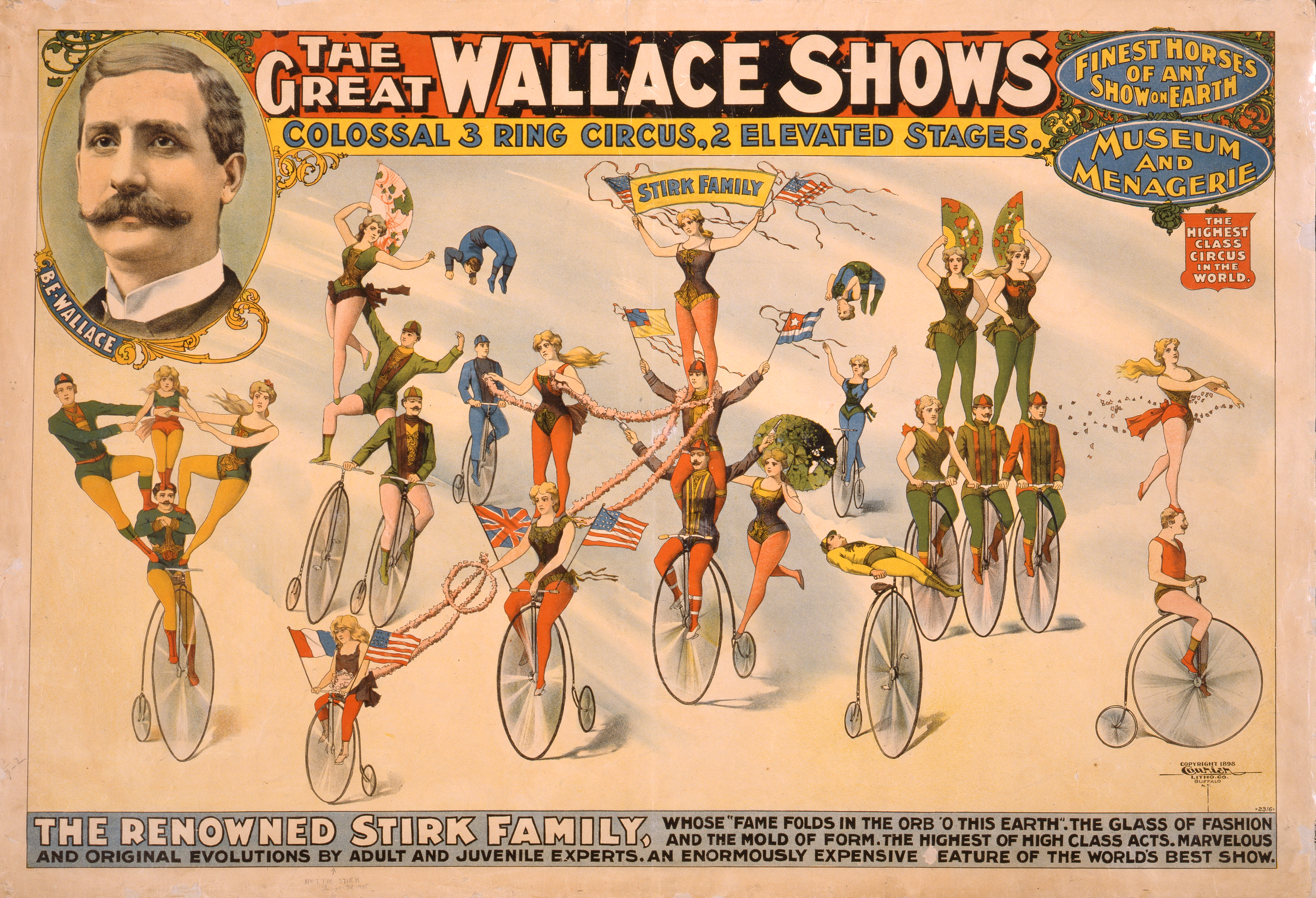
"the Stirk family, performing on bicycles"

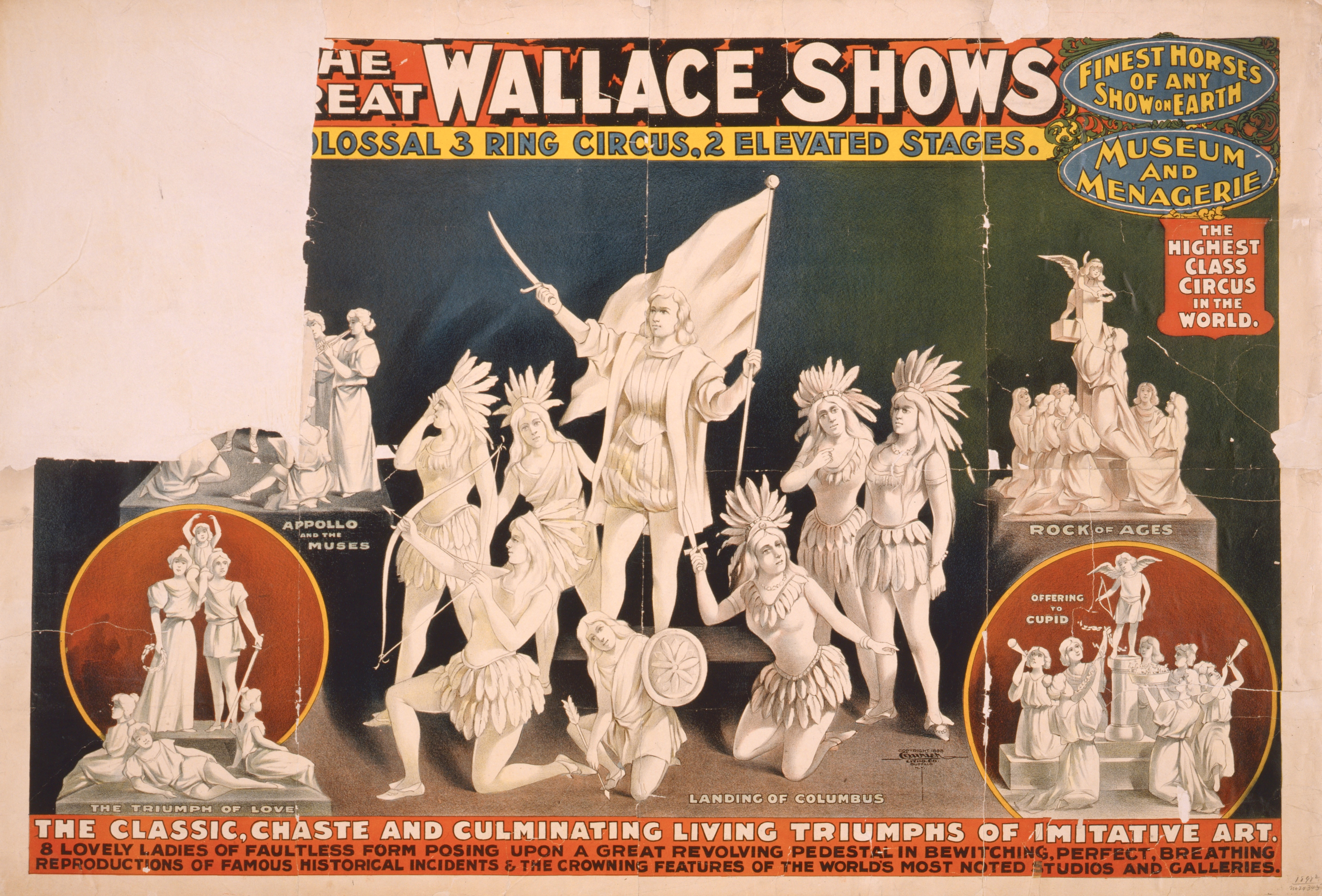
"men and women whitened to represent statues"

== Opinion of the Court ==
Justice Oliver Wendell Holmes Jr., writing for the Court, found that it was irrelevant that the posters were made for advertising. Holmes laid out this ruling in language which has become well-worn in copyright case law:

It would be a dangerous undertaking for persons trained only to the law to constitute themselves final judges of the worth of pictorial illustrations, outside of the narrowest and most obvious limits. At the one extreme, some works of genius would be sure to miss appreciation. Their very novelty would make them repulsive until the public had learned the new language in which their author spoke. It may be more than doubted, for instance, whether the etchings of Goya or the paintings of Manet would have been sure of protection when seen for the first time. At the other end, copyright would be denied to pictures which appealed to a public less educated than the judge. Yet if they command the interest of any public, they have a commercial value -- it would be bold to say that they have not an aesthetic and educational value -- and the taste of any public is not to be treated with contempt.

== Dissents ==
A dissenting opinion was submitted by Justice Harlan, joined by Justice McKenna, agreeing with the Sixth Circuit that advertising posters "would not be promotive of the useful arts within the meaning of the constitutional provision", and were therefore not "fine art" for the Constitution permitted protection.
