= WMLA (AM) =

Radio station in Normal, Illinois (1962–1990)

- Normal, Illinois; United States
- Frequency: 1440 kHz

Ownership
- Owner: Mid America Radio Group; (McLean County Broadcasters, Inc.)

History
- First air date: September 17, 1962
- Last air date: June 2, 1990
- Former call signs: WIOK (1962–1971); WAKC (1971–1977); WRBA (1977–1984); WMLA (1984–1989); WIRE (1989–1990)

Technical information
- Facility ID: 40903
- Power: 1,000 watts (day); 500 watts (night)
- Transmitter coordinates: 40°25′25″N 88°52′30″W (day); 40°26′55″N 88°51′20″W (night)

WMLA was a radio station broadcasting on 1440 AM licensed to Normal, Illinois, United States. It broadcast between 1962 and 1990 and was last owned by Mid America Radio Group.

== History ==
Beardstown residents Robert and Margareta Sudbrink, through their McLean County Broadcasting Company, obtained a construction permit to build and operate a new daytime-only AM radio station at Normal on November 27, 1961. The station, with the call letters WIOK and transmitter north of Downs, debuted September 17, 1962, with full-service programming and affiliation with the Mutual Broadcasting System.

Two years after signing on, the Sudbrinks purchased a piece of property on Main Street in downtown Normal to move the studios from the Downs transmitter. Later that year, the station was approved to begin nighttime service, using a second transmitter site further to the north in Downs.

In 1966 and 1967, the Sudbrinks attempted to sell the station twice. The Illinois Broadcasting Company filed to purchase WIOK in September 1966, but the Federal Communications Commission dismissed the application in January 1967 because of impermissible signal overlap with another station it owned, WSOY in Decatur. Three months later, WIOK found a buyer: John R. Livingston of Rockford, who purchased the station for $265,000. During this time, Joe Tait, later the radio play-by-play voice of the Cleveland Cavaliers, was WIOK's sports director.

In November 1969, Livingston sold the station to WIOK, Inc., owned by S. Carl Mark alongside radio station KAKC in Tulsa, Oklahoma. In 1971, Mark renamed the station WAKC to match his Tulsa holding and changed its format to country music. After just three years, Mark sold WAKC to Great Oaks Broadcasting, a partnership headed by former CBS News correspondent Allan Jackson, in 1974. The station expanded its broadcast day that September to 24 hours and switched its network affiliation from Mutual to CBS Radio.

After two weeks in ill health, Allan Jackson died on April 26, 1976. His passing set off a dispute between Jackson's son Stephen and the other half-owner of Great Oaks, Douglas H. Donoho. Donoho alleged that, shortly before Jackson's death, the two had entered into a pact by which one owner could have the option to buy out the other if one of them were to die. Donoho alleged that Stephen Jackson and his family refused to honor the agreement, mismanaged the station (causing it to lose listeners and face the prospect of foreclosure), and prevented Donoho from accessing the premises or business records by posting an armed guard at the station. In July, Donoho won a preliminary injunction against the Jacksons.

The ownership conflict was ended in 1977 by yet another sale of WAKC, to Robert Bivens and associates (the Iroquois County Broadcasting Company) of Watseka. The call letters were changed to WRBA when the new ownership took over on October 24, and the station dropped network programming. At the start of the 1978 Major League Baseball season, WRBA became the area's affiliation of the Chicago Cubs Radio Network, and WRBA eventually would return to both CBS and Mutual by 1980; it also broadened to a full-service adult contemporary format and in 1983 had an all-female announcer lineup during the day and, purportedly, the only female play-by-play announcer in the United States.

Bivens was charged in April 1984 with impersonating a police officer when two McLean County sheriff's deputies discovered that he carried an expired Iroquois County deputy badge in order to quickly get to his radio stations if they failed. By then, however, Bivens was also in the process of exiting McLean County radio. Three months prior, he had applied to sell the station to Withers Broadcasting of Mount Vernon, which owned WMLA (92.7 FM), for $376,000. That fall, Withers moved the WMLA call letters and country music format to AM, replacing them on the FM side with rock outlet WTWN—both fed by the Satellite Music Network. WTWN then returned to country the next year.

Withers sold the two stations—now WMLA-AM-FM—in 1987 for $700,000, plus an additional $250,000 if the FM frequency were to be upgraded, to the David Keister Stations group, also known as Mid America Radio, of Martinsville, Indiana. On June 2, 1990, it took both stations off the air in order to begin a total overhaul of the FM operation, which also included a format change, power increase and frequency change; however, the company decided not to return to the air on AM, claiming that the FCC had found the 1440 frequency "not feasible for the area" despite still holding a valid license. Without fanfare, the FCC had granted the station new call letters of WIRE at the end of 1989, which allowed the company to retain a set of heritage call letters from the Indianapolis market that it had removed from the station on 1430 AM there following a format shuffle involving that frequency earlier in the year.

Even after going off the air, the call sign on the 1440 frequency license—which remained active—changed again, this time to WBCI, in September 1990. The WBCI designation had been used at Mid America's radio station in Lebanon, Indiana, which switched with the Normal license to become WIRE because listeners there were confusing WBCI—representing Boone County, Indiana—with WIBC (1070 AM) in Indianapolis.
