= American Circus Corporation =

American owner of circuses

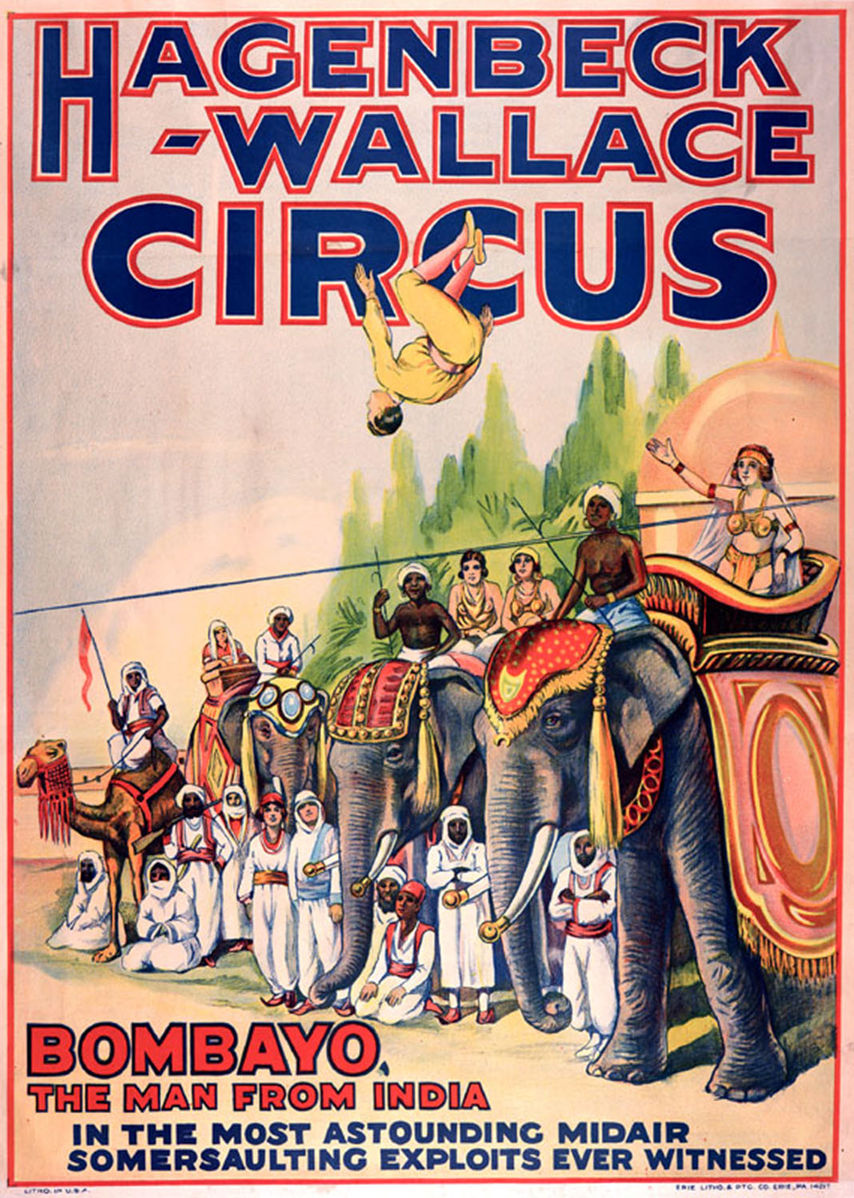

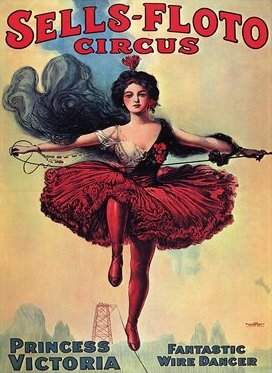

The American Circus Corporation consisted of the Sells-Floto Circus, the Hagenbeck-Wallace Circus, the John Robinson Circus, the Sparks Circus, and the Al G. Barnes Circus. It was owned by Jerry Mugivan, Bert Bowers and Ed Ballard. They sold the company in 1929 to John Nicholas Ringling for $1.7 million ($31.1 million today). With that acquisition, Ringling owned virtually every traveling circus in America.

== Hagenbeck-Wallace Circus ==
The Hagenbeck-Wallace Circus was a circus that traveled across America in the early part of the 20th century. At its peak, it was the second-largest circus in America next to Ringling Brothers and Barnum and Bailey Circus. It was based in Peru, Indiana.

== Al G. Barnes Circus ==
Al G. Barnes Circus was an American circus run by Alpheus George Barnes Stonehouse.

== Sells Floto Circus ==
The Sells Floto Circus was a combination of the Floto Dog and Pony Show and the Sells Brothers Circus that toured with sideshow acts in the United States during the early 1900s.

== John Robinson Circus ==
The John Robinson Circus was founded by John Robinson and Joseph Foster.

== Sparks Circus ==
Sparks Circus as established by John H. Wiseman (1863-1903). He used the name of Sparks on all of his entertainment shows and legally changed his name to John H. Sparks. He died on January 29, 1903.
