= Cathy Day =

American writer and academic

- Born: Peru, Indiana, U.S.
- Education: DePauw University; University of Alabama (MFA)
- Occupations: Novelist; short story writer; professor
- Website: cathyday.com

Cathy Day is an American novelist, short story writer, and English professor. She is the author of the linked story collection, The Circus in Winter (Harcourt, 2004), and a memoir, Comeback Season: How I Learned to Play the Game of Love (Free Press, 2008).

== Biography ==
Cathy Day was born in Peru, Indiana. She graduated from DePauw University in 1991 and earned her M.F.A. in creative writing from the University of Alabama in 1995. Since 1997, Day has been teaching creative writing at the college level. She has taught at Minnesota State University, Mankato, The College of New Jersey, and the University of Pittsburgh.

She is currently an Associate Professor at Ball State University, where she also serves as the Assistant Chair of Operations in the English Department.

Day's work has been published in numerous literary magazines, including PANK, Ninth Letter, River Styx, The Southern Review, Gettysburg Review, and Quarterly West.

== Books ==
- The Circus in Winter. Harcourt. 2004. ISBN 015101048X.
- Comeback Season: How I Learned to Play the Game of Love. Free Press. 2008. ISBN 9781416557104.
