= Terrace Park High School =

School in Terrace Park, Ohio, United States

Terrace Park High School/Elementary School (built 1913) is a school building in Terrace Park, Ohio in the Greater Cincinnati area.

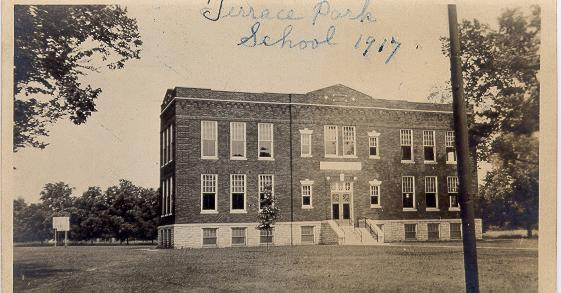
Terrace Park High School (July 1918)

== History ==
=== Establishment ===
The site for the school at 723 Elm was first established in the early 1870s when T. R. Biggs deeded it to the village, and the "village voted $12,000 for a school there." Prior to the 1913 building's construction, another building preceded it and served as the school from 1872 until 1913. The 1872 structure was an alternative to the "one room schoolhouse, built in 1853, [that] still stands at the corner of Given, Indian Hill and Wooster Pike.". The 1872 building formerly stood in front of the 1913 building and no longer exists. The 1913 building cost approximately $30,000. The 1913 building functioned as a high school until 1957, when it joined the Mariemont School District, and eventually the building along with its additions became Terrace Park's elementary school.

Two thousand years ago, part of the site of the Terrace Park school was occupied by "one of the largest of its kind of the 295 prehistoric earthworks ever found in Hamilton County.... In 1820, when it first attracted scientific interest, it was still six feet high and 12 feet wide at its base."

=== Demolition of Interior ===
Under $39 million school plans to renovate facilities throughout the Mariemont School District (which includes this building), most of the interior of the building will be demolished using bond money approved on May 4, 2010 as part of a "combination bond issue/operating levy." School district documents indicate the estimated cost of demolition and rebuilding of Terrace Park Elementary School to be $12.5 Million or $220 per sq. ft. According to the District this is to save money: "Funding the entire facilities plan now costs less than the current path of fixing aging systems as they break."

If the bond had not been approved, the School Board planned "reductions [to] include elimination of elementary art, music, and physical education and the implementation of a full pay to participate system in the district that would cost athletes, musicians, and actors an estimated $450 ‐ $1000 per high school activity."

Interior items of the building were sold on April 4, 2011.

Asbestos abatement was scheduled to begin on April 6, 2011. Demolition is scheduled to begin on April 25, 2011.
