= Sells Floto Circus =

American circus

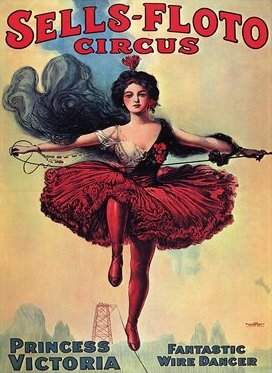

Origin
- Country: United States

Information
- Operator(s): Frederick Gilmer Bonfils
- Fate: Incorporated into the American Circus Corporation by 1929
- Type of acts: Buffalo Bill Cody

The Sells Floto Circus was a combination of the Floto Dog & Pony Show and the Sells Brothers Circus that toured with sideshow acts in the United States and Canada during the early 1900s.

== History ==
Frederick Gilmer Bonfils and Harry Heye Tammen owned the first outfit as well as the Denver Post, and the "Floto" name came from the Post's one-time sportswriter, Otto Floto.

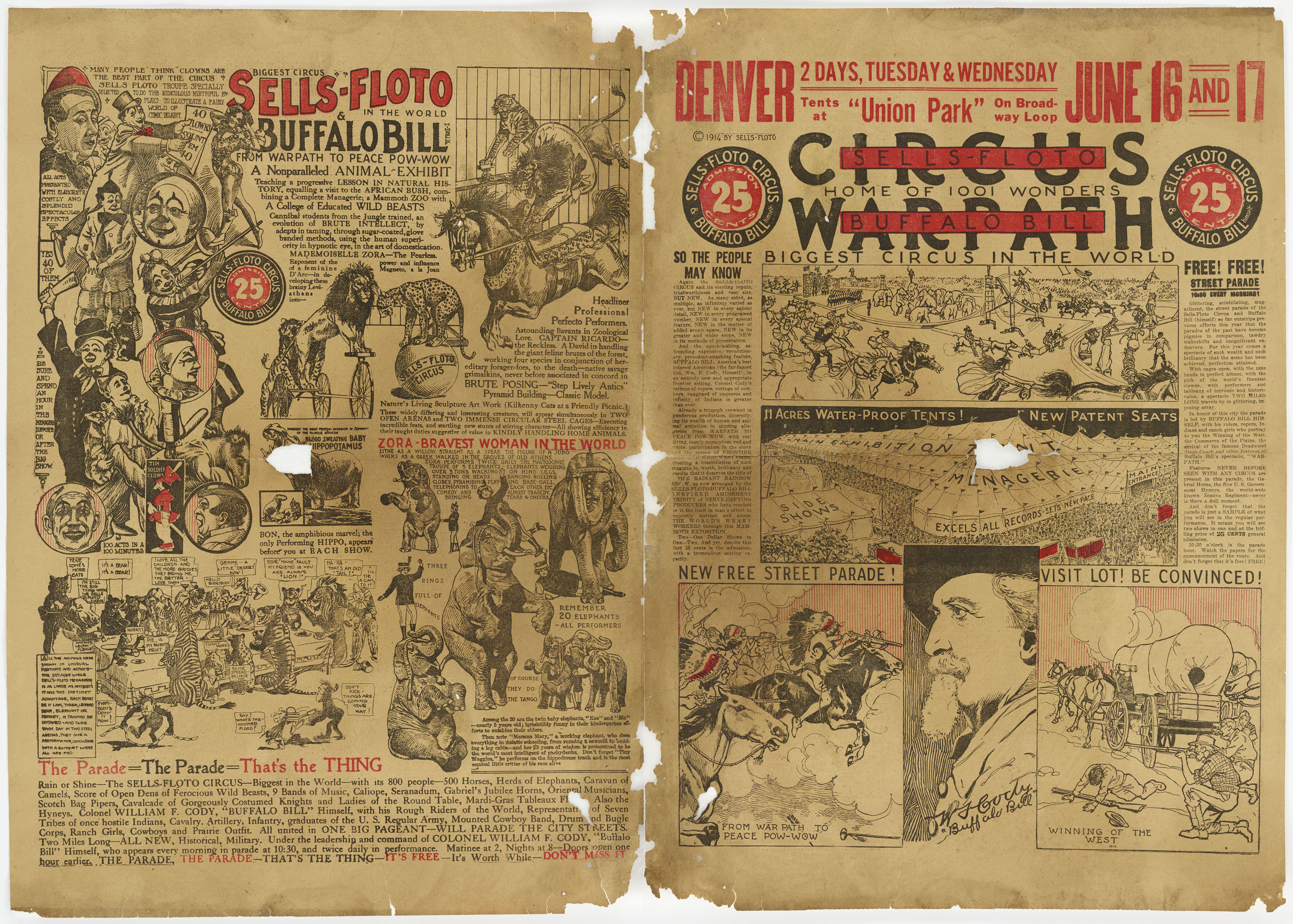
Advertising publication for the circus performance in Denver. At head of caption title: "Denver. Tents at 'Union Park' on Broadway Loop. 2 days, Tuesday and Wednesday, June 16 and 17."

The Sells Floto circus absorbed Buffalo Bill's Wild West shows, and the Sells Brothers Circus, it was also a "combined" show. It later became the concessions department of Ringling Brothers Circus, along with Haggenback Wallace, who made the floats and other equipment.

The circus had four elephant births, three born to "Alice" and one to "Mama Mary." The sire of all four was "Snyder." None survived longer than five months.

By 1929, the Sells Floto Circus was part of the American Circus Corporation which consisted of Hagenbeck-Wallace Circus, the John Robinson Circus, the Sparks Circus, and the Al G. Barnes Circus. John Nicholas Ringling then bought American Circus Corporation for $1.7-million creating a monopoly of traveling circus in America.

On April 17, 1908, the Sells-Floto circus appeared in Riverside CA. When the animals were ushered off the train, a vapor flashback explosion occurred at the adjacent oil storage tank. This frightened the animals, and led to an elephant stampede into downtown Riverside, leaving one person dead and six others injured.

Feld Entertainment later used the Sells-Floto name for their supply division, located in Laurel, MD, that provided logistical support for all of the Feld shows for supplies and merchandise, including not only the three units of Ringling Bros. and Barnum & Bailey Circus, but the numerous On Ice shows (Disney on Ice, Ice Follies, etc.). This unit has since been renamed Feld Consumer Products.

== Alternate names ==
- Sells-Floto Circus, Harry Tammen and Fred Bonfils, proprietors
- Sells-Floto Circus & Buffalo Bill's Wild West
- Sells-Floto Circus, John Ringling, proprietor
- Sells-Floto Circus & Buffalo Bill's Wild West
- Sells-Floto Circus, American Circus Corp., proprietor

== Members ==
- Lucia Zora joined the circus in 1904 and gained fame as an elephant trainer and lion tamer.
- During the 1914–1915 seasons, the circus featured Buffalo Bill Cody.
- Novelist and cookbook author Isabel Moore's "first career" was as a trapeze artist with Sells Floto ca. 1928. She took the job because she had "courage, but no brains."
- Pasqual Piñón, (1889–1929), known as "The Two-Headed Mexican", was a performer with the Sells-Floto Circus in the early 1900s.
- In 1919, professional boxer Georges Carpentier exhibited his boxing skills with the Sells Floto Circus for ten weeks at the rate of $2,000 a week.

== Gallery ==
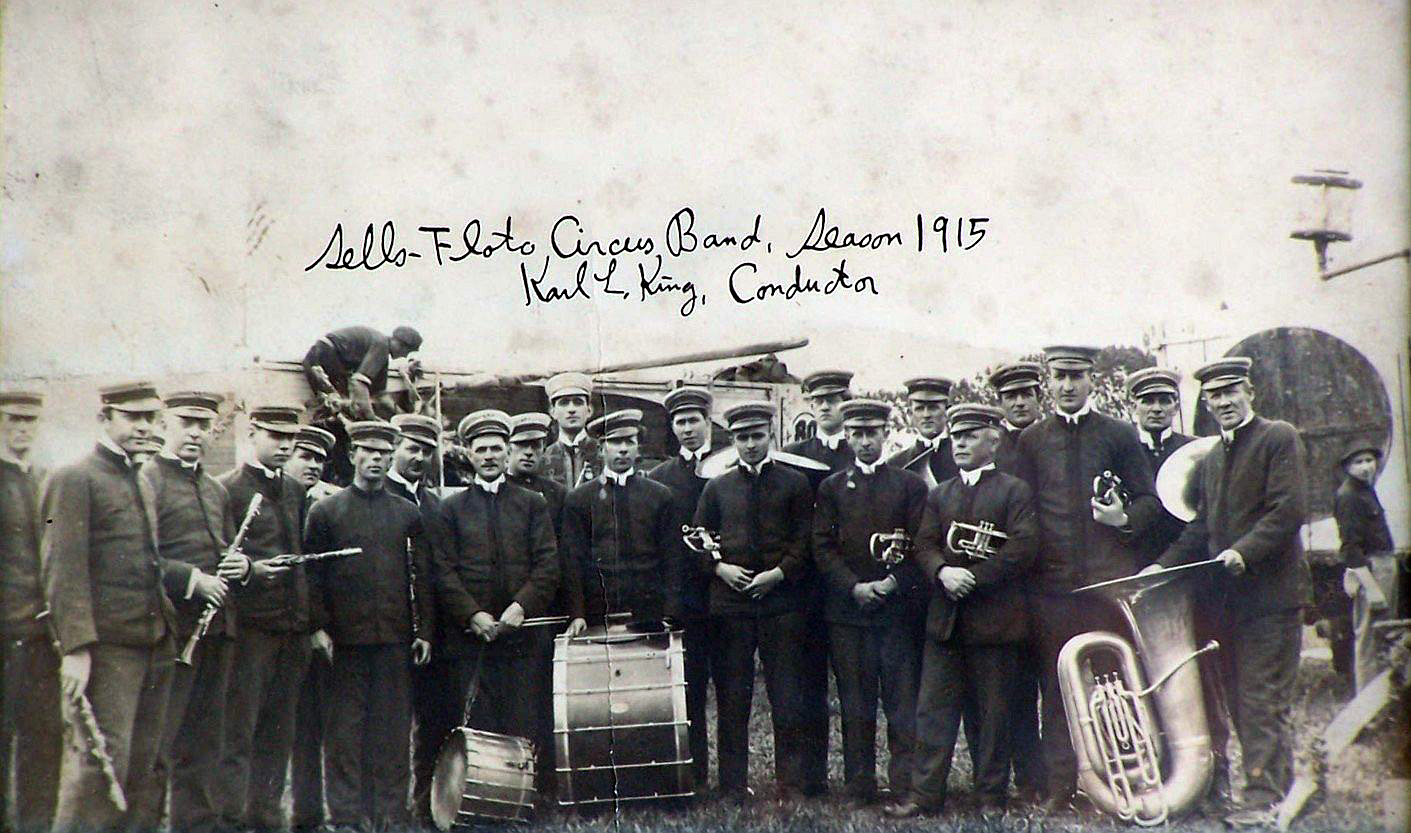
Sells Floto Circus Band in 1915

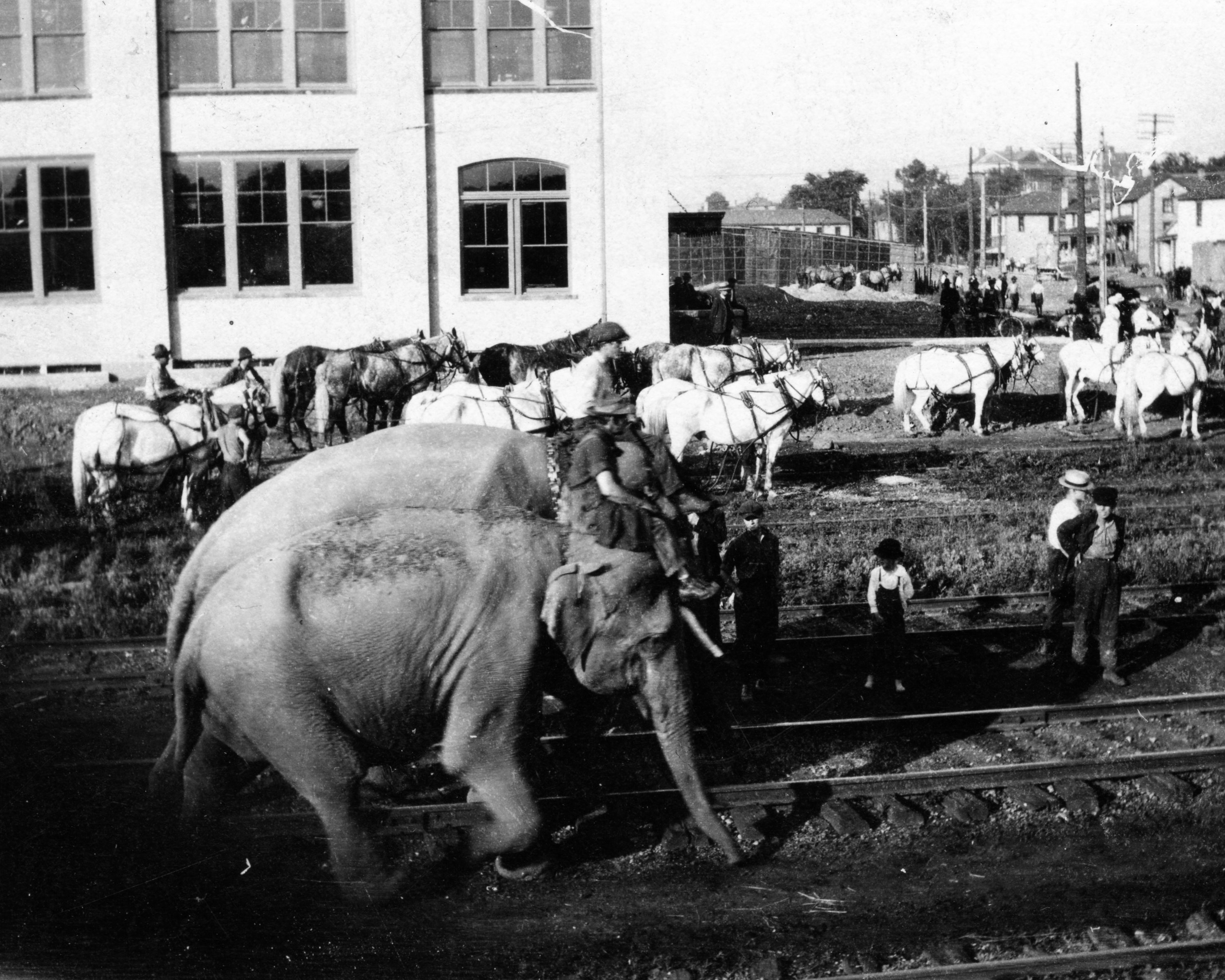
Unloading the DT&I train in Springfield, Ohio in 1920

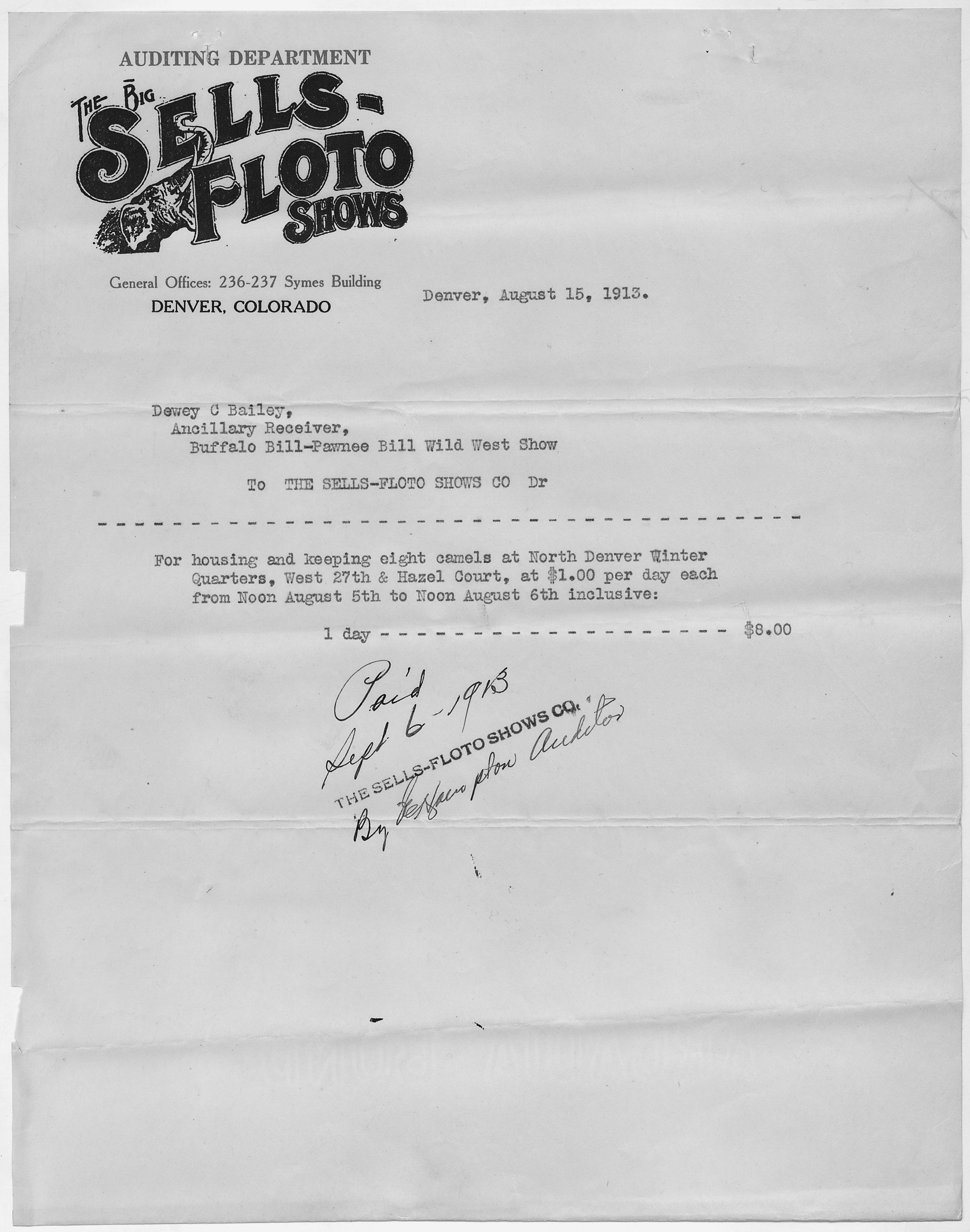
Invoice for fees incured by the Sells-Floto Circus for animal housing

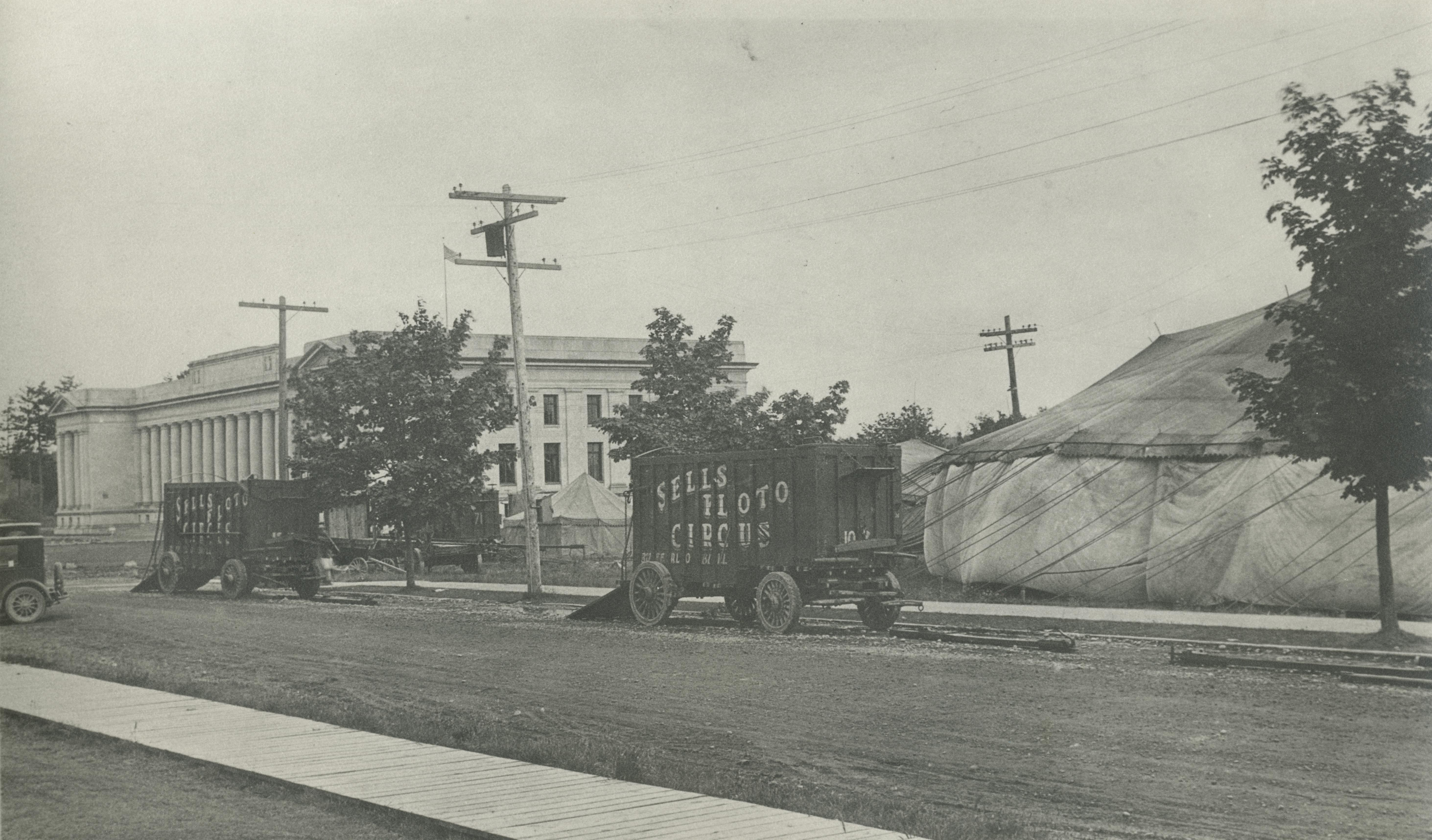
On the Capitol Campus in Olympia, Washington, circa 1921-1929.
