= John Robinson Circus =

Former American circus

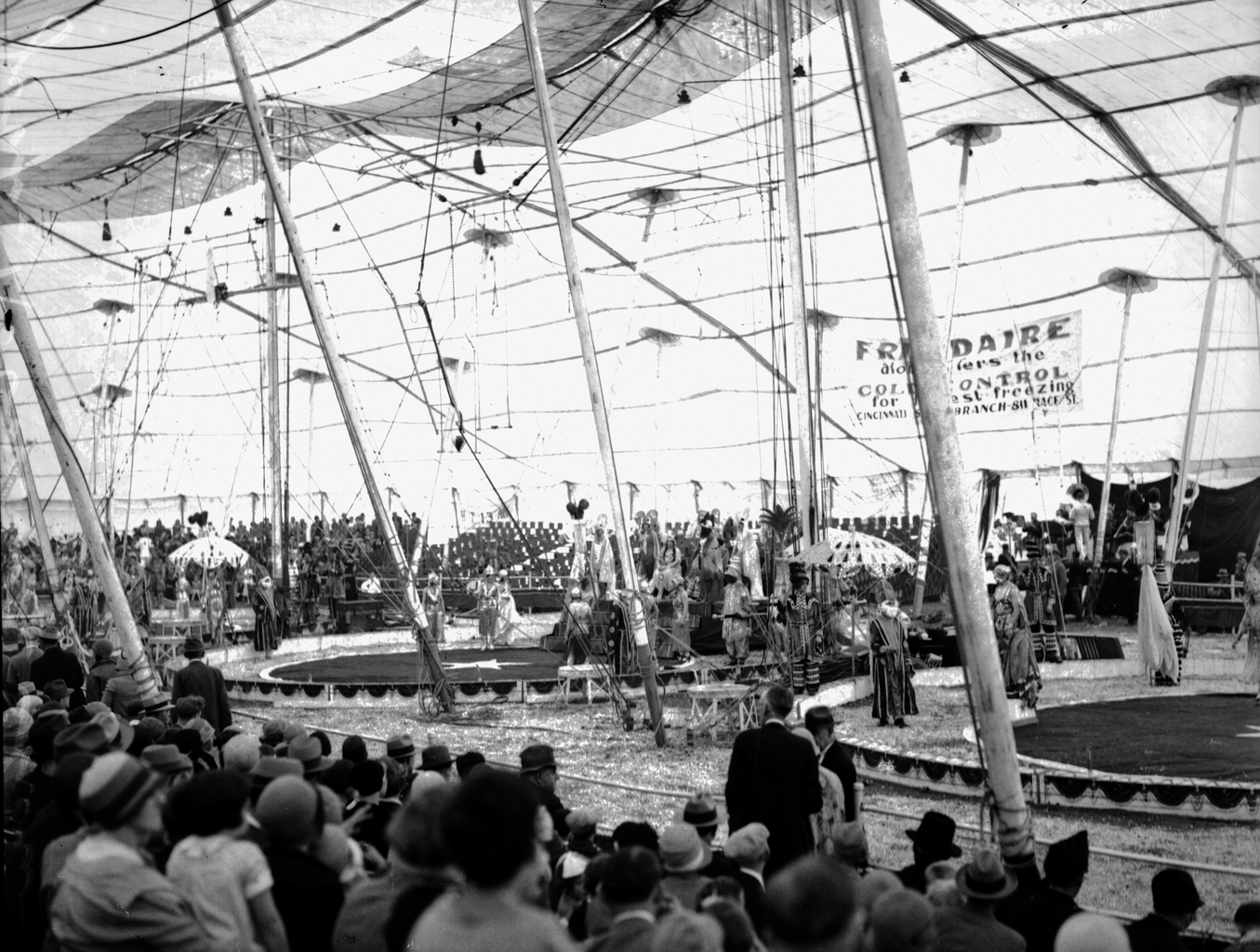

Origin
- Country: United States
- Founder(s): John H. Robinson

Information
- Fate: Purchased by the American Circus Corporation and then by John Ringling

John H. Robinson created the John Robinson Circus, whose winter quarters were in Terrace Park, Ohio.

== Famous elephants ==
=== Chief ===
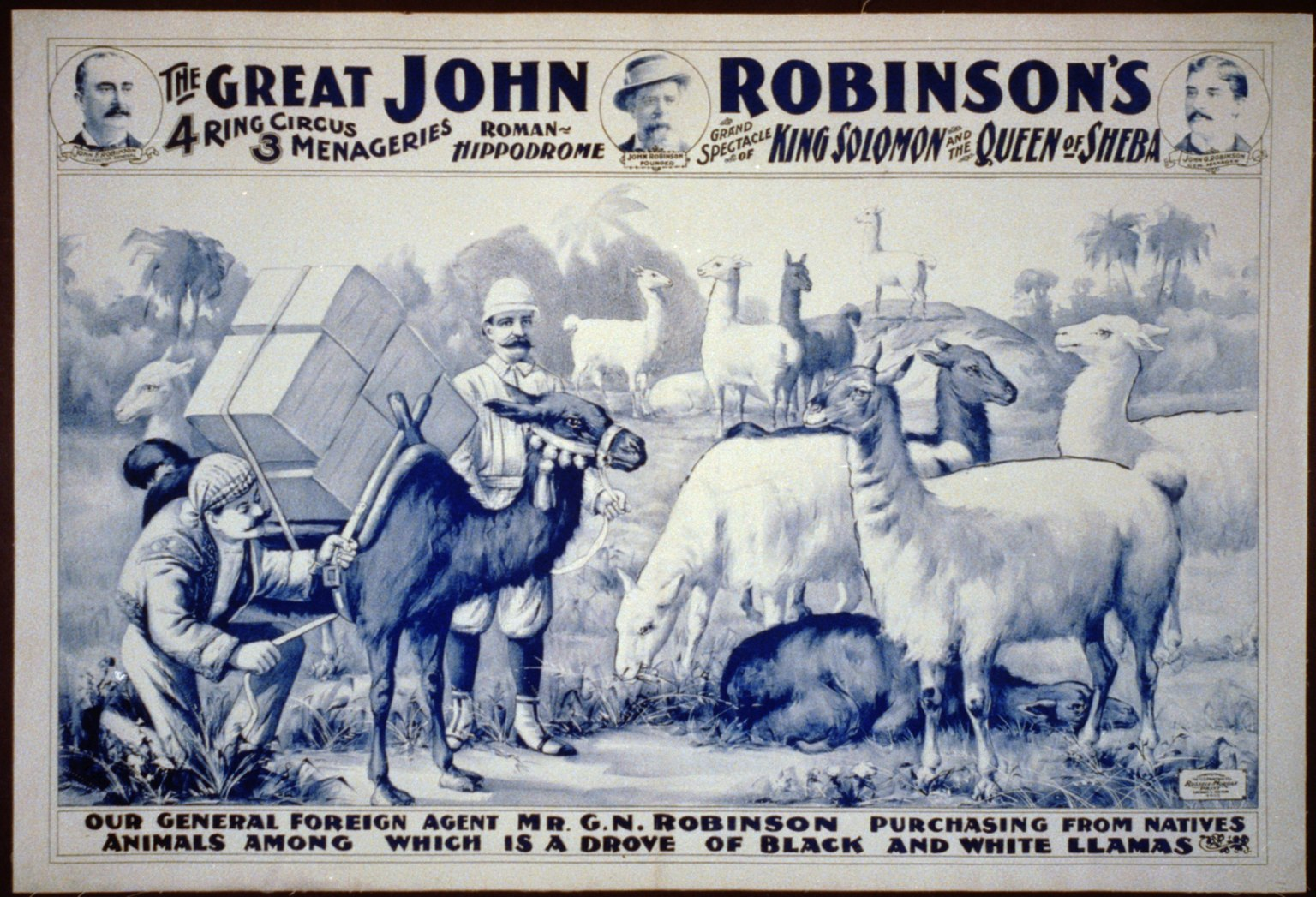

"Chief", an elephant from John Robinson's circus, killed his trainer in Charlotte, North Carolina.

=== Tillie ===
Tillie the elephant was part of the circus. She was known to walk the streets of Terrace Park, Ohio and is buried there.

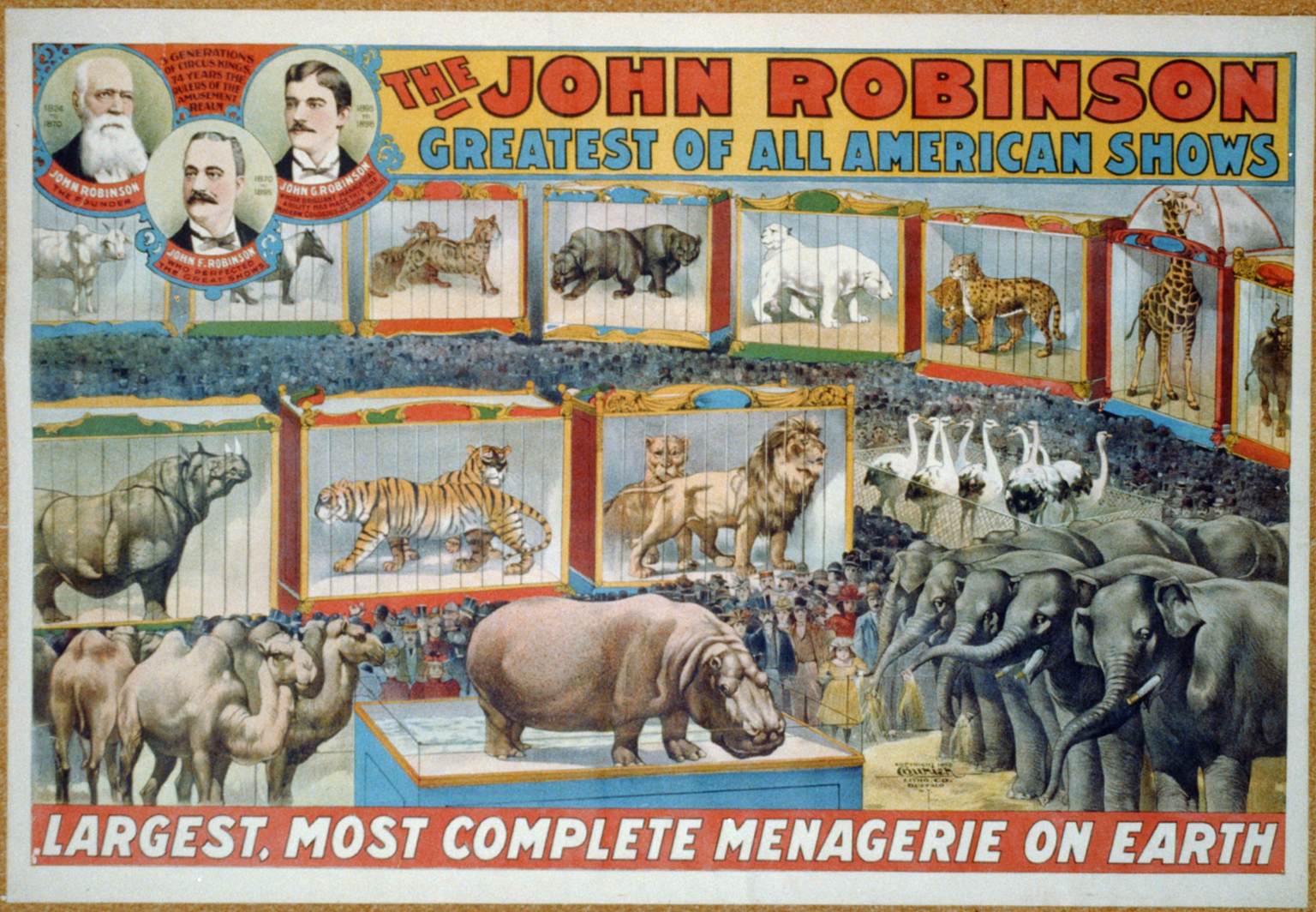

== Winter quarters in Terrace Park ==
The Circus had its winter quarters in Terrace Park, Ohio. Tillie the elephant was known to walk the streets of Terrace Park and is buried there. The owner's house is a mansion.

== Routes ==
The circus performed in the neighborhood of Northside, Cincinnati (formerly Cumminsville, Ohio) starting with a parade from the railroad crossing at Blue Rock and Hamilton to Luckey's Field in South Cumminsville. Tillie led the procession.

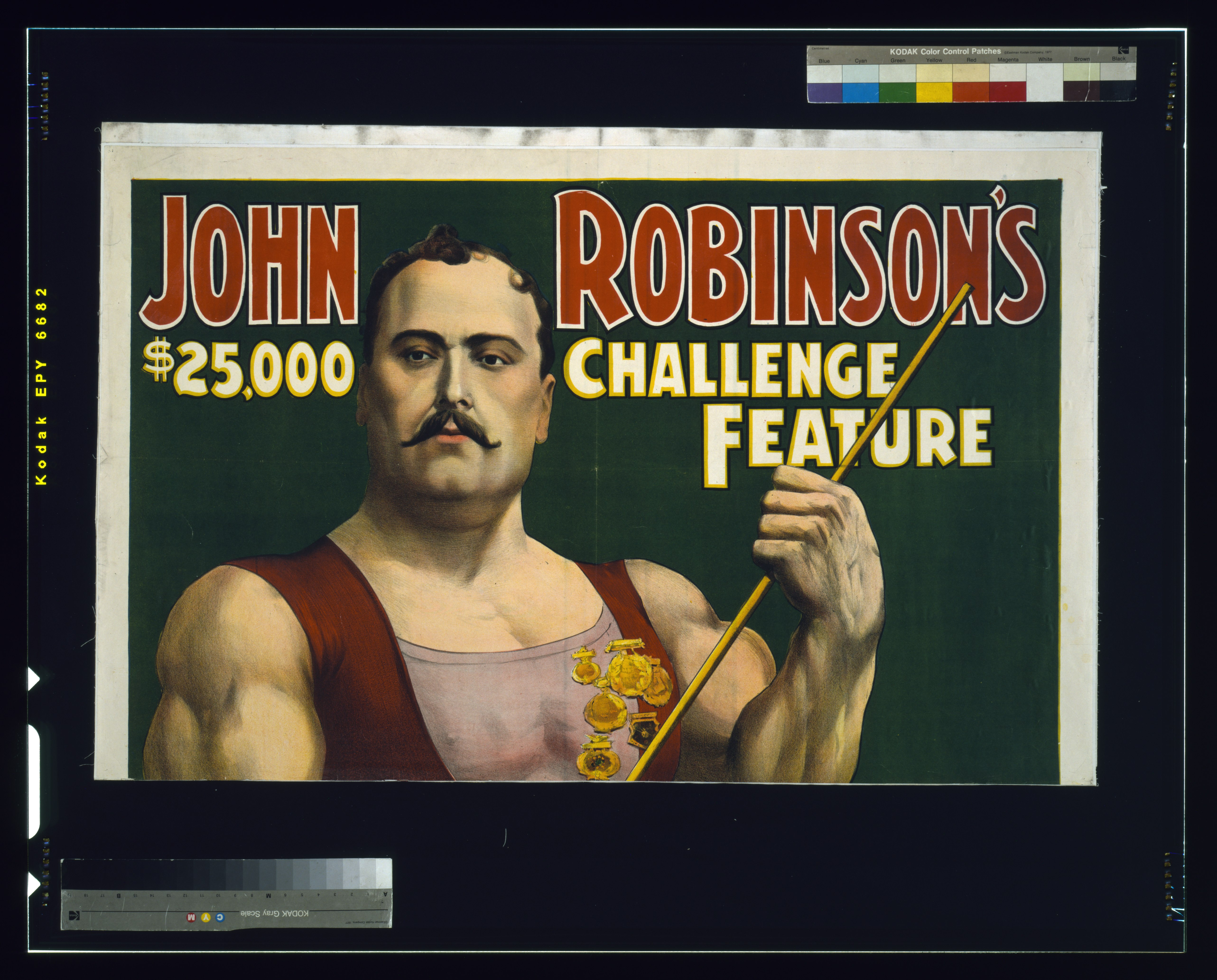

== Ownership changes ==
The John Robinson Circus toured from 1842 until 1911 (69 years). It was one of the longest running family owned circuses in the United States. The circus was owned and managed by four generations of "John Robinsons".

1. John Robinson I (1807–1888)
2. John Franklin Robinson II (1843–1921)
3. John Gilbert Robinson III (1872–1935)
4. John Gilbert Robinson IV (1893–1954)

The circus became part of the American Circus Corporation.

In 1929, John Ringling bought the American Circus Corporation, which consisted of the Sells-Floto Circus, the Hagenbeck-Wallace Circus, the John Robinson Circus, the Sparks Circus, Buffalo Bill's Wild West Show, and the Al G. Barnes Circus. He bought them from Jerry Mugivan, Bert Bowers, and Ed Ballard, for $1.7 million (approximately $31,875,000 today). With that acquisition, Ringling owned all of the major traveling circuses in America.

== Trivia ==
The basement of the St. Thomas Episcopal Church in Terrace Park contains a museum of the Terrace Park Historical Society that includes the history of the Robinson Circus.

== Gallery ==
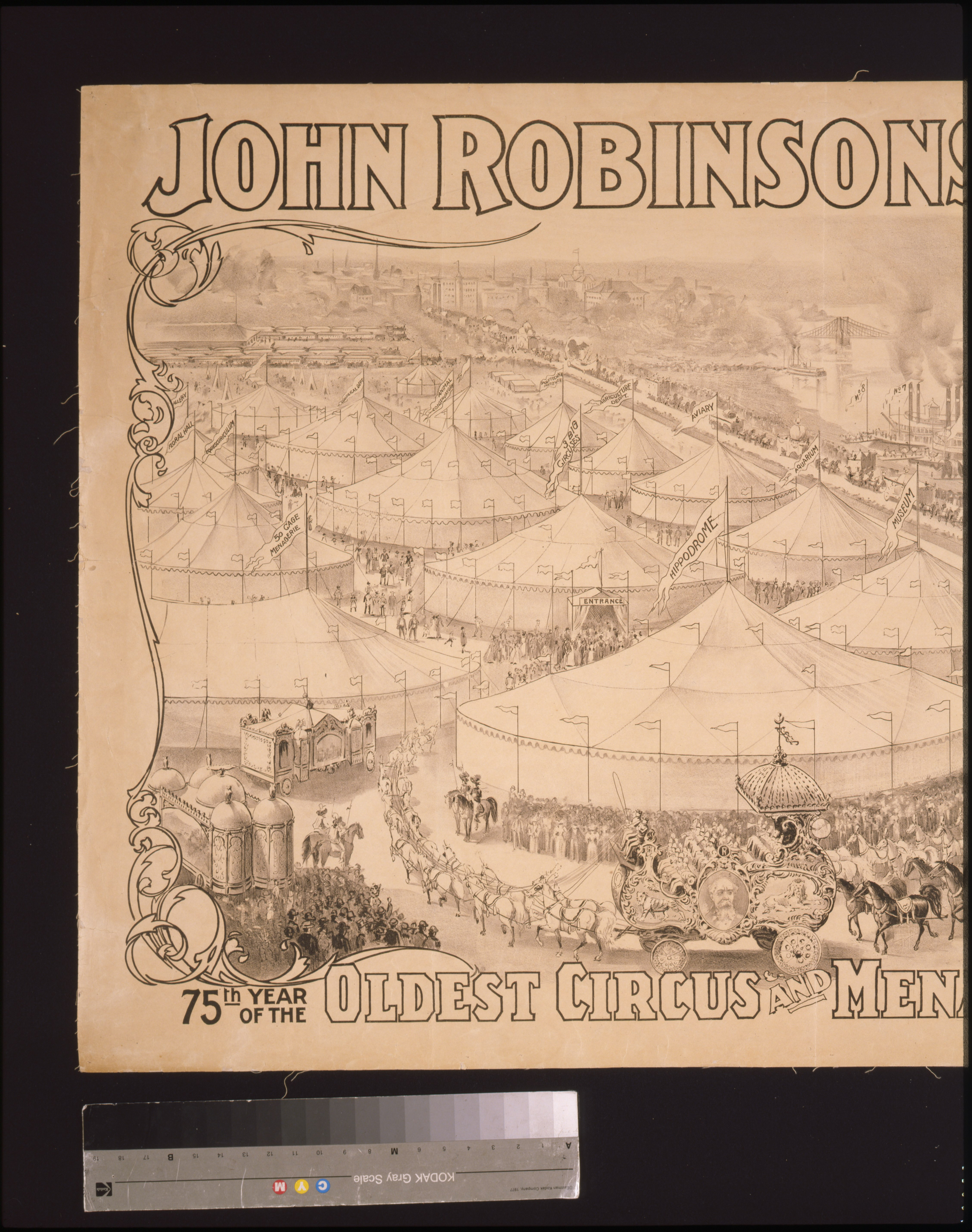

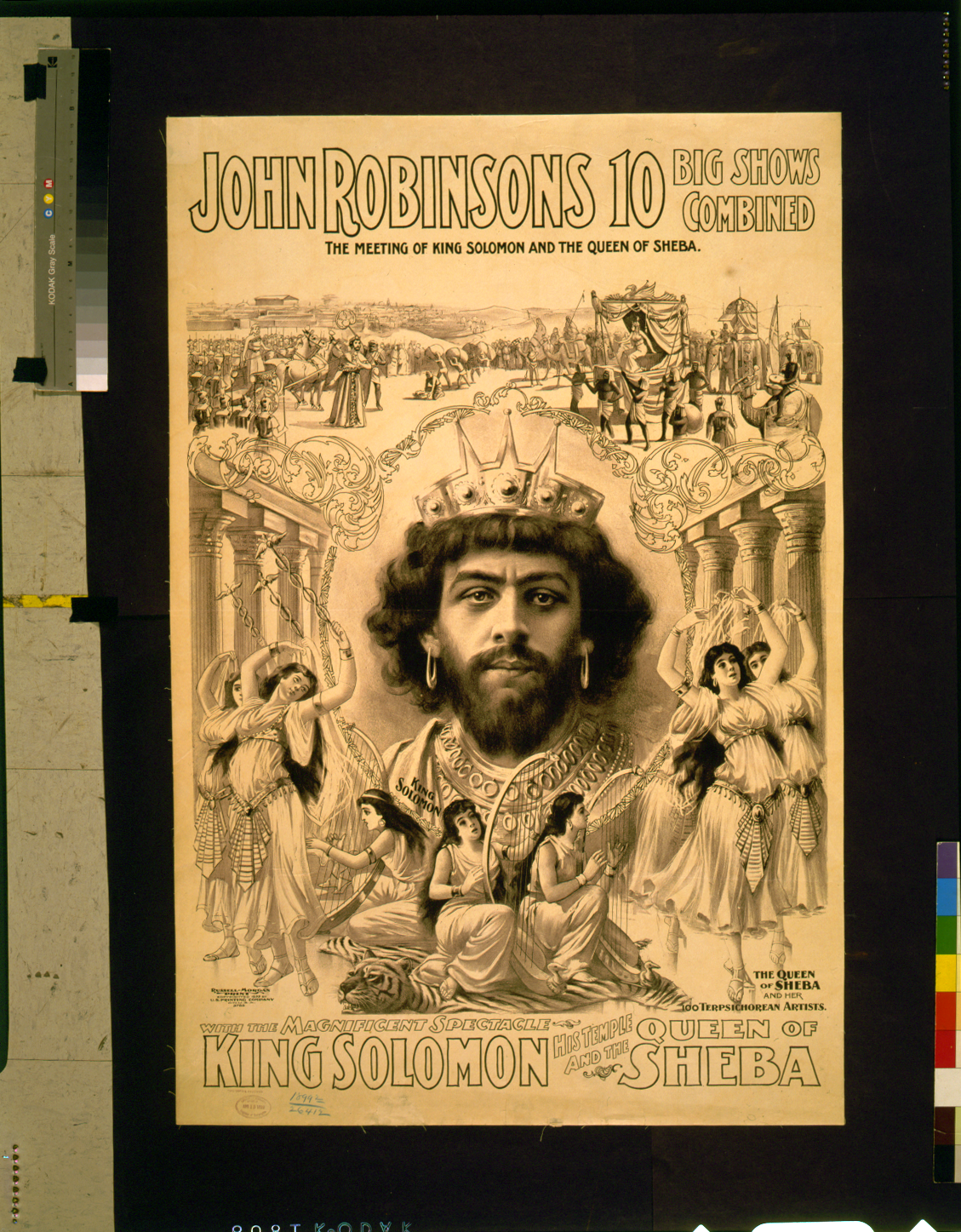

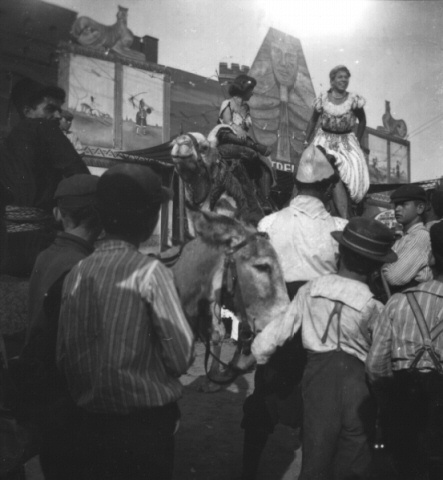

== Resources ==
The Cincinnati Museum has a collection of manuscripts related to the circus:

- "Manuscripts & Archives". Cincinnati Museum Center.

Resources listed in OCLC WorldCat Identities:

- Give 'em a John Robinson: a documentary on the old John Robinson Circus by Richard E. Conover (Book)
- Looking backward thirty-three weeks with a circus: a complete history of the John Robinson's ten big shows for the season of 1905 by Doc Waddell (Book)
- John Robinson's Circus and the magnificent newly added spectacle "Cleopatra, Queen of Egypt" a stupendous portrayal of the most powerful story in ancient history, will exhibit at Terre Haute Thu. July 24 by John Robinson's Circus (Book)
- John Robinson Circus Collection
- 1904 Winter quarters of John Robinson's Circus at Terrace Park by William H Graver
- Miscellaneous pamphlets, etc. by John Robinson's Circus
- Album of photographs of John Robinson's Ten Big Shows by Louis Ritz
- 1700-1900 blocks between Spruce and Pine Streets by J. B Sturtevant (Visual)
- Circus playbills, programs, and other printed material
- Circus World Museum poster collection (Magazine and daily review)
- Route book of the John Robinson's 10 big shows combined. Season of 1899 by John Robinson's Circus (published 1899) (Book)
- King Solomon and the Queen of Sheba: now produced in conjunction with John Robinson's great world's exposition & ten big shows combined(published 1893)(Book)
- Circus World Museum route book collection

Other:

- Purcell, Erin. "The Robinson Circus". tphistoricalsociety.org. Terrace Park Historical Society.
- "Entry for Address: 1 Circus Place. Building Name: Robinson Circus House". Terrace Park Building Survey. Terrace Park Woman's Club.
