= John Robinson (circus owner) =

American circus owner (1843–1921)

John Franklin Robinson II (4 November 1843 Linden, Alabama – 30 April 1921 Miami, Florida) was a second generation owner and operator of the John Robinson Circus, based in Cincinnati and wintered in Terrace Park, Ohio. The John Robinson Circus became part by American Circus Corporation.

He built the Robinson's Opera-House in 1872.

== Robinson Circus ==
John Robinson created the John Robinson Circus, whose winter quarters were in Terrace Park, Ohio. The Cincinnati Museum has a collection of manuscripts related to the circus. The circus became part by American Circus Corporation.

=== Famous elephants ===
"Chief", an elephant from John Robinson's circus, killed his trainer in Charlotte, North Carolina.

Tillie the elephant was part of the circus. She was known to walk the streets of Terrace Park, Ohio.

=== Winter Quarters in Terrace Park ===
The Circus had its winter quarters in Terrace Park, Ohio.

==== Robinson House ====
Robinson's house is still standing in Terrace Park.
