= Joshua Brookes =

English anatomist and naturalist

Joshua Brookes FRS FLS FZS
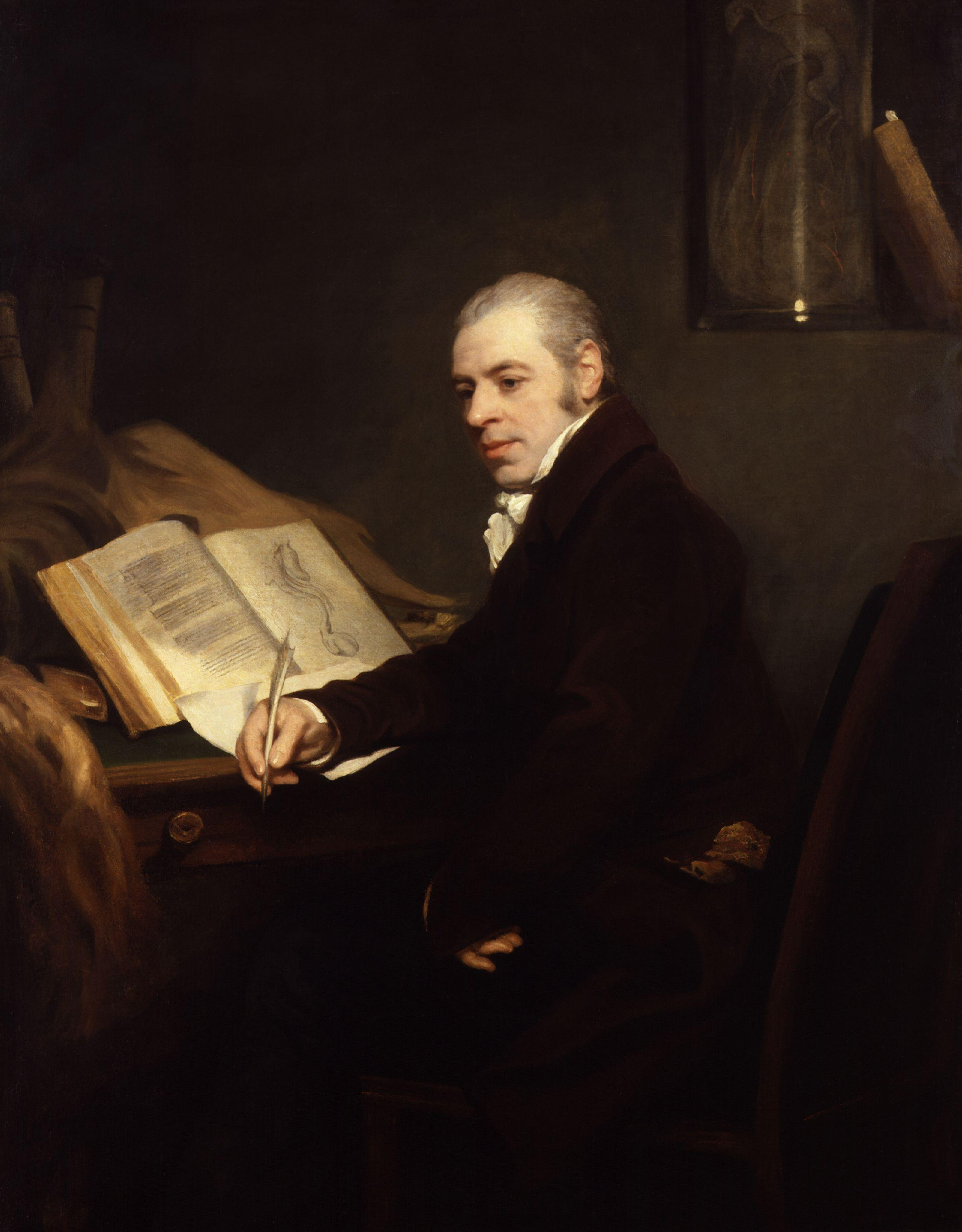
- Portrait by Thomas Phillips, 1815
- Born: 24 November 1761; London
- Died: 10 January 1833 (aged 71); Great Portland Street, London
- Burial place: St James's Church, Piccadilly
- Known for: Brookesian Museum; comparative osteology
- Scientific career
- Fields: Comparative anatomy, osteology, zoology
- Academic advisors: John Hunter
- Notable students: Thomas Bell; William Sharpey; Edward Turner Bennett
- Author abbrev. (zoology): Brookes

Joshua Brookes (24 November 1761 – 10 January 1833) was an English anatomist, surgeon and naturalist. He was a teacher of anatomy in London and developed the Brookesian Museum, a major private collection of anatomical and zoological specimens regarded as second only to that of John Hunter. He was known for his work in comparative osteology, for developing a method of preserving anatomical subjects for lectures and class dissections, and for contributions to zoological nomenclature. He was elected a Fellow of the Royal Society in 1819.

== Early life ==
Brookes was born on 24 November 1761 to Joshua Brookes (c. 1734–1803), a London dealer in birds and exotic animals who operated several menageries, and his first wife, Frances Paul (1737/8–1787). He was their second son and one of their twelve children.

Several of Brookes's brothers were involved in the family's animal-dealing business. His brother John Brookes (baptised 1762), known as "Wild Beast Brookes", jointly managed their father's menagerie and later kept a menagerie at the Exeter Exchange. He also supplied Joshua with animal subjects used in his anatomical work.

== Education and training ==
He received a classical education and began his professional studies at the age of sixteen under Magnus Falconer. He subsequently attended anatomy and surgery lectures in London delivered by Andrew Marshal, William Hewson, John Sheldon and William Hunter. Surviving school exercises from about 1783 and 1786 identify Brookes as a student at Mr Trubey's Academy in Red Lion Court, Bermondsey Street, London.

Brookes was also a pupil of John Hunter and assisted him in the dissection of an immature female northern bottlenose whale caught in the River Thames in 1783.

After attending the practice of surgeons at London's principal hospitals and public institutions, Brookes received his diploma as a surgeon from the Company of Surgeons.

He then went to Paris to improve his knowledge of practical anatomy and surgery, where he attended the Hôtel-Dieu de Paris and other hospitals, and studied under Antoine Portal and other eminent surgeons.

== Career ==
=== Anatomical teaching ===
Brookes became a teacher of anatomy in London and established a private anatomical school in Blenheim Street, Great Marlborough Street, in the mid-1780s. Over a teaching career of about forty years, he taught anatomy to more than 5,000 students. His school housed his growing collection of anatomical and zoological specimens, which developed into the Brookesian Museum, and included a Theatre of Anatomy.

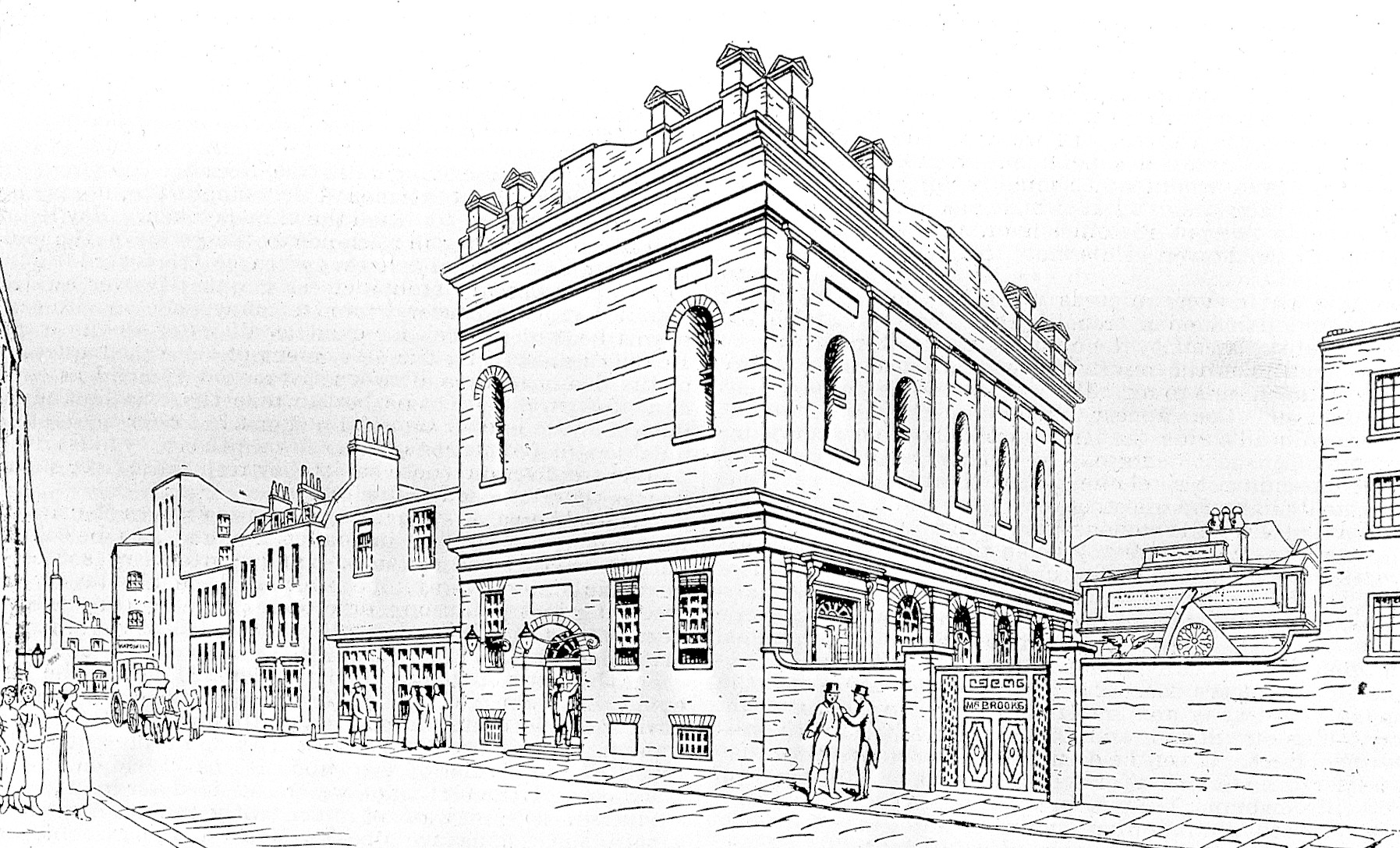
Brookes's private school of anatomy, known as the Great Marlborough Street School

Brookes combined lectures with practical dissection. His school offered instruction in anatomy, physiology and surgery, while spacious rooms were provided for students to dissect and inject specimens under his supervision. Contemporary advertisements also promoted weekly "Anatomical Converzationes", at which the subjects treated were discussed with the students and their views considered. He became known as an accurate anatomist and excellent dissector, and William Jerdan later regarded him as one of the leading figures in British anatomy, second only to John Hunter.

Brookes also developed a method of preserving anatomical subjects for lectures and dissection by injecting an antiseptic fluid into the blood vessels. The fluid contained nitrate of potash (potassium nitrate), among other substances, and was intended to preserve the natural colour of the tissues and arrest decomposition, allowing practical instruction to continue during the summer. His interest in preservation is also reflected in a paper, Of the antiseptic power of alum, dated 1784, which survives in the archives of the Royal Society.

Among Brookes's pupils and students were the zoologists Thomas Bell and Edward Turner Bennett, the veterinary surgeon William Youatt, the botanist and physician John Joseph Bennett, and the physiologist William Sharpey.

The importance of Brookes's teaching is also reflected in his portrait by Thomas Phillips, painted in 1815 at the request of the students studying under him.

=== Brookesian Museum ===
==== Development and contents ====
Brookes had already begun collecting anatomical preparations and objects of natural history before his move to Great Marlborough Street in the mid-1780s. His collection grew alongside his anatomical teaching and by the early 19th century had developed into the Brookesian Museum, a major private collection of anatomical and zoological specimens, which occupied the upper two floors of his house. The collection was closely integrated with his teaching and was especially rich in comparative specimens. The historian Norman Moore described the formation of the osteological museum as Brookes's “hobby”, noting that, with help from his brother, the menagerie keeper, he converted “every animal upon which he could lay his hands” into skeletons.

In his 1828 auction catalogue, Brookes stated that he had spent thirty years and £30,000 forming the collection. The catalogue described the collection as containing upwards of 6,000 preparations and recorded their provenance and methods of preparation, particularly for specimens illustrating pathological and comparative anatomy. The museum contained more than 3,000 anatomical preparations of the human body, representing healthy and diseased states, alongside an extensive collection of comparative anatomy and zoological specimens. It was open to his students, scientific visitors and private gentlemen, and to the general public at least one Saturday each month.

The garden adjoining Brookes's school contained a vivarium constructed principally from large masses of the Rock of Gibraltar, in which he kept exotic animals. The premises had previously been associated with the Cavendish family: Henry Cavendish leased the property to Brookes in 1788; the garden had earlier been used by Cavendish and his father, Lord Charles Cavendish, for scientific measurements. In 1830, George Johann Scharf produced a lithograph of the vivarium, which Brookes published.

==== Sale and dispersal ====
Brookes attempted to sell the museum as a complete collection, but the attempt was unsuccessful. A major auction began at his Theatre of Anatomy on 14 July 1828 and continued for 24 days, after which a substantial portion of the collection had been dispersed. The Royal College of Surgeons of England was a purchaser at the sale, acquiring specimens to the value of £800, and bought a few further specimens at the subsequent sale of the remaining portion in 1830. University College London acquired part of Brookes's collection in 1828. The University of Cambridge purchased a considerable part of the collection in 1830, and its osteological specimens were subsequently marked as the "Brookes collection".

The remainder of the museum was offered for sale in 1830. Brookes's Museum Brookesianum, published that year, described this portion as comprising nearly half of the original collection and announced its sale at the Theatre of Anatomy in Blenheim Street, beginning on 1 March 1830 and continuing for 22 following evenings, Saturdays and Sundays excepted. The remaining specimens were dispersed by auction.

=== Scientific and zoological work ===
Brookes was elected a Fellow of the Royal Society on 18 November 1819. His election certificate described him as distinguished in the osteological branch of comparative anatomy and noted his collection of animal skeletons, which it characterised as the largest then held by an individual in Britain. He was also a Fellow of the Linnean Society of London and was active in the Society's Zoological Club, delivering its anniversary address in 1828. Brookes also described himself as a Fellow of the Zoological Society of London and as a member of the Leopoldina and the Moscow Society of Naturalists.

His scientific work was closely connected with the specimens assembled in his museum. He studied comparative osteology and used specimens of mammals and birds, including elephants, rhinoceroses and hippopotamuses, in his work.

==== Zoological nomenclature ====
Brookes's zoological work included proposing new taxonomic names, particularly in his museum catalogues. In 1827, he proposed the genus Lycaon for the African wild dog, naming the species Lycaon tricolor; the species is currently classified as Lycaon pictus (Temminck, 1820), with L. tricolor treated as a synonym. In his 1828 catalogue, Brookes also proposed the generic names Acinonyx for the cheetah and Mammuthus for the mammoth, both of which remain in use.

Brookes had used the name Megalocerus for the giant deer in his 1827 Brookesian Museum, where he listed two crania as Megalocerus antiquorum, and again in his 1828 catalogue. The ICZN subsequently ruled Megalocerus to be an incorrect original spelling and Megaloceros (Brookes, 1828) to be the correct original spelling. Brookes also proposed the family-group name Capreolidae in his 1828 catalogue, based on the genus Capreolus. The name is the basis of the modern subfamily Capreolinae; although the correctly formed spelling was introduced by John Edward Gray in 1852, the name is generally cited as Capreolinae Brookes, 1828.

In 1828, Brookes first used the generic name Lagostomus for the plains viscacha, proposing the specific name Lagostomus trichodactylus. The animal had previously been described by Nicolas Desmarest in 1817 as Dipus maximus. Brookes first presented the name to the Zoological Club of the Linnean Society of London on 27 May 1828, and a brief synopsis of his account was published later that year in the Zoological Journal. A fuller account was read before the Zoological Club on 3 and 17 June and published in the Transactions of the Linnean Society of London in 1829.

== Personal life ==
Brookes married Mary Wood at Stepney on 29 May 1791; they had no children and later separated. He also had a son, Joshua Brookes (1806–1841), with Elizabeth Sheen. The younger Joshua later became a surgeon in the Royal Navy.

== Later life ==
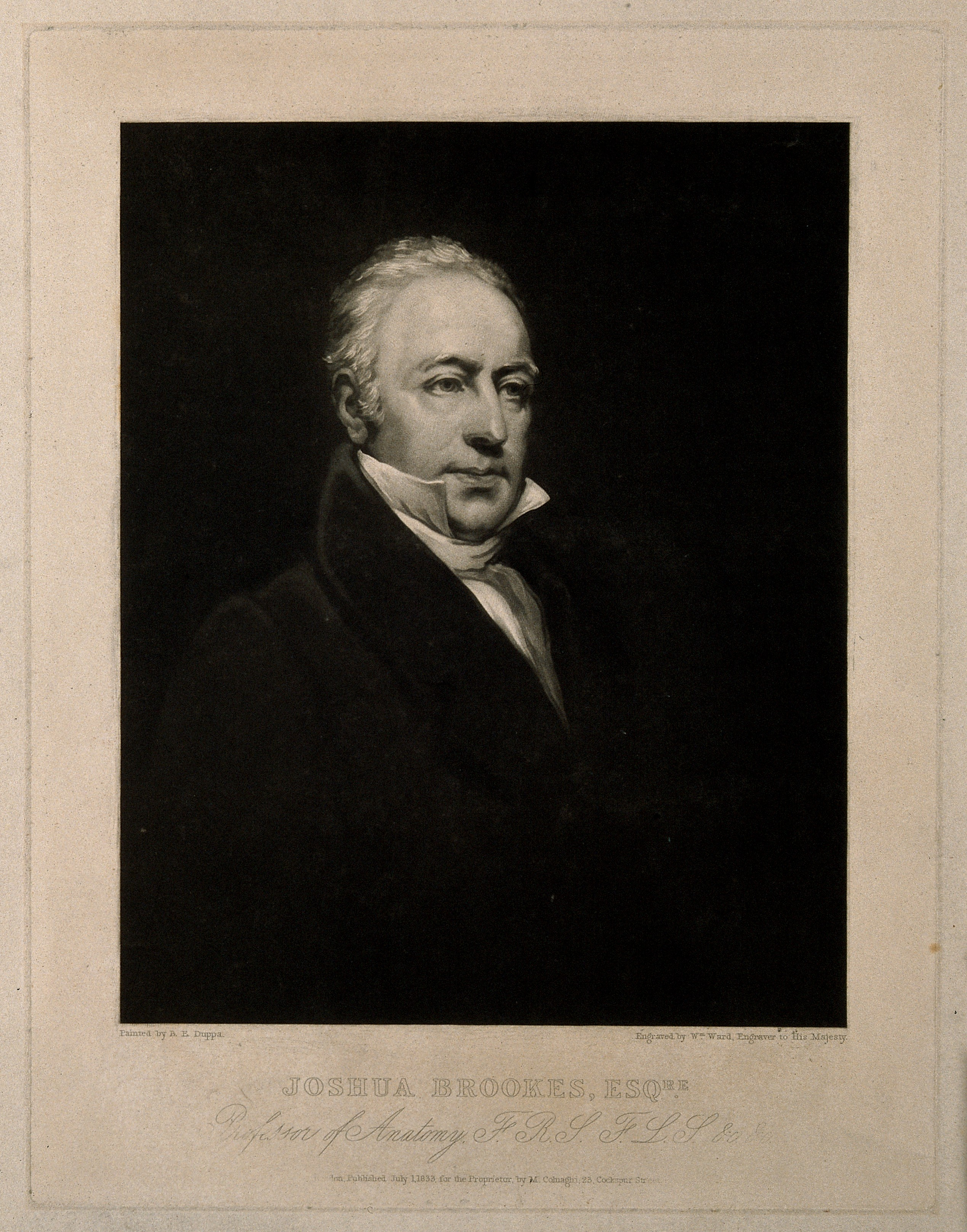
A mezzotint of Brookes by W. Ward after B. E. Dupp, 1833

Brookes was remembered as an exceptionally dedicated teacher, but also for his unconventional personal habits. John Flint South later described him as “without exception the dirtiest professional person” he had encountered, associating his appearance partly with his continual use of snuff. South nevertheless regarded him as an excellent teacher of practical anatomy. The naturalist John James Audubon, who visited Brookes in 1828 to see his collection of skeletons, later recorded that Brookes received him and his companion with “extreme kindness”.

During the 1820s, Brookes's anatomical school declined amid changes in the regulations of the Royal College of Surgeons of England governing anatomical education. His class, formerly numbering about 120 to 150 students, subsequently dwindled to only a few. Ill health forced Brookes to give up regular teaching in 1826. His pupils and friends subsequently held a dinner in his honour, and his pupils subscribed to a marble bust of him by Robert William Sievier, a former pupil who had studied anatomy under Brookes. The bust was presented to him by the Duke of Sussex.

In March 1826, Brookes was consulted by Edward Cross, proprietor of the menagerie at the Exeter Exchange, during the crisis surrounding Chunee, an elephant that had become dangerous. Brookes and the anatomist William Clift advised on the animal's anatomy, identifying areas behind the blade-bone where shots were more likely to reach the heart. Chunee was subsequently killed after numerous shots had been fired. The dissection of Chunee attracted considerable public and medical interest. Brookes later wrote to The Times to deny a report that he had dressed and eaten part of the elephant.

After retiring from regular anatomical teaching, Brookes continued to lecture on natural history and anatomy to members of the Zoological Society of London. In 1827, he delivered a course on the anatomy of the ostrich at the Society's rooms.

In 1828, Brookes gave evidence to the House of Commons Select Committee on Anatomy on the difficulties of obtaining bodies for anatomical teaching. The issue had already attracted controversy in 1822, when the body of Edward Lee, an executed man, was traced to Brookes's dissecting rooms after his undertaker, George Cundick, sold the body for dissection. Brookes was not called as a witness in the resulting case, while Cundick was convicted and sentenced to six months' imprisonment.

== Death ==
Brookes died suddenly on 10 January 1833 at his residence in Great Portland Street, London. He was buried at St James's Church, Piccadilly.

Later accounts described Brookes as having died in poverty. Moore stated that Brookes died "without a shilling", having spent his resources on his osteological collection. Moore also stated that a subscription was raised to meet the expenses of his funeral.

== Legacy ==
Following Brookes's death, his former anatomical school in Blenheim Street reopened on 1 October 1833. Thomas King (1802–1839) delivered the introductory lecture, in which he commemorated Brookes's career and lamented the dispersal of his museum. King stated that Brookes had spent “all his fortune and almost all his life” collecting the museum, but that circumstances had compelled him to dispose of it.

The genus Brookesia Gray, 1864, was named in honour of Brookes by John Edward Gray in a paper read in 1864 and published in the Proceedings of the Zoological Society of London in 1865.

Brookes's school and museum formed part of the tradition of private anatomical teaching and specimen-based scientific study in Georgian and early 19th-century London.

== Selected writings ==
- Lectures on the Anatomy of the Ostrich (1827)
- Brookesian Museum: The Museum of Joshua Brookes, Esq. ... consists of a Collection of Anatomical and Zoological Preparations (1827)
- A Prodromus of a Synopsis Animalium (1828)
- A Catalogue of the Anatomical and Zoological Museum of Joshua Brookes, Esq. (1828)
- An Address Delivered at the Anniversary Meeting of the Zoological Club of the Linnean Society (1828)
- On a New Genus of the Order Rodentia (1829)
- Museum Brookesianum: A Descriptive and Historical Catalogue of the Remainder of the Anatomical & Zootomical Museum of Joshua Brookes, Esq. (1830)
- Thoughts on the Best Means of Lessening the Destructive Progress of Cholera (1831)
Title page of Brookesian Museum (1827)

Title page of A Catalogue of the Anatomical and Zoological Museum of Joshua Brookes, Esq. (1828)

Title page of Museum Brookesianum (1830)

== See also ==
- History of anatomy
- Comparative anatomy
- Osteology
- Anatomical theatre
- Zoological nomenclature
