= Winchelsea (disambiguation) =

Winchelsea is a town in East Sussex, England.

Winchelsea may also refer to:

== Places ==
- Winchelsea, Victoria, Australia, a town
- Winchelsea (UK Parliament constituency)
- Shire of Winchelsea, a former local government area around the Australian town

== Railway stations ==
- Winchelsea railway station, serving the English town
- Winchelsea railway station, Victoria, serving the Australian town

== Ships ==
- Winchelsea (1803 EIC ship), an East Indiaman
- HMS Winchelsea, various ships of Britain's Royal Navy

== Other ==
- Winchelsea Football & Netball Club, Victoria, Australia
