= List of shipwrecks in June 1837 =

The list of shipwrecks in June 1837 includes ships sunk, foundered, wrecked, grounded, or otherwise lost during June 1837.

== 1 June ==
List of shipwrecks: 1 June 1837
Ship	State	Description
Emily	United States	The ship was wrecked south of Pernambuco, Brazil. She was on a voyage from Santos, Brazil to an American port.

== 2 June ==
List of shipwrecks: 2 June 1837
Ship	State	Description
Haidee	United Kingdom	The ship was wrecked on the Hogsty Reef. She was on a voyage from Aux Cayes, Haiti to Falmouth, Cornwall.

== 3 June ==
List of shipwrecks: 3 June 1837
Ship	State	Description
Emma Augusta	Hamburg	The ship sprang a leak and foundered in the North Sea. Her crew were rescued. She was on a voyage from Harwich, Essex, United Kingdom to Altona.
Lark	United Kingdom	The ship was driven ashore and wrecked at Strumble Head, Pembrokeshire. Her crew were rescued.
William	United Kingdom	The ship was driven ashore and wrecked near "Parnaiha". Her crew were rescued. She was on a voyage from Rio de Janeiro, Argentina to Maranhão, Brazil.

== 4 June ==
List of shipwrecks: 4 June 1837
Ship	State	Description
Henry	United Kingdom	The ship was driven ashore and wrecked on Ingonish, near Cape North, Nova Scotia, British North America. Her crew were rescued.

== 5 June ==
List of shipwrecks: 5 June 1837
Ship	State	Description
Memnon	United Kingdom	The ship ran aground on the Black Rock off the coast of County Galway. She was on a voyage from Galway to London. Memnon was refloated and proceeded on her voyage.
Poland	United States	The ship ran aground at Saint-Vaast-la-Hougue, Seine-Inférieure, France. She was on a voyage from Havre de Grâce, Seine-Inférieure to New York. Poland was refloated and put back to Havre de Grâce.

== 6 June ==
List of shipwrecks: 6 June 1837
Ship	State	Description
George IV	United Kingdom	The ship ran aground at Blyth, Northumberland. She was on a voyage from Blyth to Dover, Kent.
Norfolk	United Kingdom	The ship was wrecked at San Antonio, Republic of Texas. Her crew were rescued.

== 7 June ==
List of shipwrecks: 7 June 1837
Ship	State	Description
Edward	United Kingdom	The ship collided with Happy Return (United Kingdom) and foundered off the coast of Cornwall. Her crew were rescued. She was on a voyage from Swansea, Glamorgan to Falmouth, Cornwall.
Johanne Henrietta	Bremen	The ship ran aground of the Seal Sand. She was on a voyage from Bremen to Arbroath, Forfarshire, United Kingdom. She was later refloated and put back to Bremen.
Union	United Kingdom	The steamship suffered a boiler explosion and sank at Hull, Yorkshire with the loss of seventeen lives. She was on a voyage from Hull to Gainsborough, Lincolnshire.
Venus	United Kingdom	The ship struck the quayside at Littlehampton, Sussex and sank. She was on a voyage from Memel, Prussia to Littlehampton.

== 8 June ==
List of shipwrecks: 8 June 1837
Ship	State	Description
Mercator	United Kingdom	The ship was wrecked on the Gunfleet Sand, in the North Sea off the coast of Essex. Her crew were rescued. She was on a voyage from Sunderland, County Durham to Lisbon, Portugal.

== 12 June ==
List of shipwrecks: 12 June 1837
Ship	State	Description
Hèlène	France	The schooner capsized in the English Channel off the Owers Lightship ( Trinity House). She was beached at Goring-by-Sea, Sussex, United Kingdom and then taken in to Littlehampton, Sussex. Hèlène was on a voyage from Bordeaux, Gironde to Altona.

== 15 June ==
List of shipwrecks: 15 June 1837
Ship	State	Description
Briton	United Kingdom	The barque was wrecked near Bombay, India with the loss of three of her crew. She was on a voyage from Bombay to Liverpool, Lancashire. She was later refloated.
Edina	United Kingdom	The ship was driven ashore north of Bahia, Brazil. She was on a voyage from Bahia to London. Edina was later refloated and put into Pernambuco, Brazil.
William Mulvey	United Kingdom	The ship was wrecked and sank at Mazatlán, Mexico. Her crew were rescued by Morayshire (United Kingdom).

== 17 June ==
List of shipwrecks: 17 June 1837
Ship	State	Description
Adelaide	India	The ship was driven ashore and wrecked at Bombay.
Aurora	India	The floating church was driven ashore and wrecked in a hurricane at Bombay.
Berenice	British East India Company	The paddle steamer was driven ashore and damaged in a hurricane at Bombay.
Corsair	(United Kingdom of Great Britain and Ireland) Singapore	The ship was driven ashore and damaged at Bombay. She was later refloated.
Edinburgh	United Kingdom	The ship was driven ashore in a hurricane at Bombay. She was later refloated.
Elizabeth	United Kingdom	The ship was driven ashore in a hurricane at Bombay. She was later refloated.
General Harewood	United Kingdom	The ship was driven ashore and wrecked in a hurricane at Bombay. She was subsequently converted into a floating church to replace Aurora ( India).
Hastings	India	The receiving ship was driven ashore in a hurricane at Bombay. She was later refloated.
Hind	India	The ship was driven ashore and wrecked in a hurricane at Bombay.
Hugh Lindsay	India	The paddle steamer was driven ashore in a hurricane at Bombay.
John Stamp	United Kingdom	The ship was driven ashore and damaged in a hurricane at Bombay. She was later refloated.
Mary Dugdale	United Kingdom	The ship was driven ashore and wrecked in a hurricane at Bombay.
Northumberland	United Kingdom	The ship was driven ashore and wrecked in a hurricane at Bombay.
Ranger	United Kingdom	The ship was driven ashore and wrecked in a hurricane at Bombay.
Rapid	United Kingdom	The ship was driven ashore and wrecked in a hurricane at Bombay.
Richard Walker	United Kingdom	The ship was driven ashore and wrecked in a hurricane at Bombay.
Tapee	India	The ship was driven ashore and wrecked in a hurricane at Bombay.

== 18 June ==
List of shipwrecks: 18 June 1837
Ship	State	Description
Proof	United Kingdom	The ship was run down and sunk by Menai (United Kingdom). She was on a voyage from Newcastle upon Tyne, Northumberland to Sidmouth, Devon.
William Tell	United Kingdom	The ship was driven ashore at New Orleans, Louisiana, United States.

== 23 June ==
List of shipwrecks: 23 June 1837
Ship	State	Description
Estrella	Brazil	The ship was lost at the mouth of the Pará River. She was on a voyage from Pará to Maranhão.

== 24 June ==
List of shipwrecks: 24 June 1837
Ship	State	Description
Elizabeth	United Kingdom	The ship was wrecked at Martinique.
Vivid	United Kingdom	The ship was wrecked in the Îles des Madeleines, Senegal. She was on a voyage from Dublin to Bathurst, Africa.

== 25 June ==
List of shipwrecks: 25 June 1837
Ship	State	Description
Charlotte	United Kingdom	The ship capsized and sank on the Toxfleet Sand. She was on a voyage from Gainsborough, Lincolnshire to New York, United States.
Dispatch	United Kingdom	The ship foundered off The Smalls. Her crew were rescued. She was on a voyage from Cardiff, Glamorgan to Youghal, County Cork.
Harriet	United States	The ship was wrecked in the Gut of Canso. Her crew were rescued. She was on a voyage from New York to Quebec City, Lower Canada, British North America.
William Rippon	United Kingdom	The ship was driven ashore and severely damaged on the Île d'Orléans, Lower Canada, British North America. She was on a voyage from Quebec City, Lower Canada to Sunderland, County Durham.

== 26 June ==
List of shipwrecks: 26 June 1837
Ship	State	Description
Variable	United Kingdom	The ship sank at Wallsend, Northumberland. She was consequently condemned.

== 27 June ==
List of shipwrecks: 27 June 1837
Ship	State	Description
Emerald	United Kingdom	The ship capsized and sank at Montreal, Lower Canada, British North America. She was refloated on 30 June.

== 28 June ==
List of shipwrecks: 28 June 1837
Ship	State	Description
Celia	United Kingdom	The ship ran aground on the Great Kiln Flats, off Staten Island, New York City, United States. She was on a voyage from Liverpool, Lancashire to Perth Amboy, New Jersey, United States. Celia was refloated on 30 June.
Henry	United Kingdom	The ship capsized off Newport, Monmouthshire. She was on a voyage from Southend, Essex to Cork.
Mary Ann	United Kingdom	The ship was wrecked on the Square Handkerchief Reef. Her crew were rescued. She was on a voyage from Saint John, New Brunswick, British North America to Saint Domingo.
Rosalind	United Kingdom	The ship was wrecked on the Pickles Reef. She was on a voyage from Black River, Jamaica to Liverpool.

== Unknown date ==
List of shipwrecks: Unknown date in June 1837
Ship	State	Description
Belle	United Kingdom	The ship was driven ashore near Teignmouth, Devon. She was on a voyage from Swansea, Glamorgan to Teignmouth.
Gladstanes	United Kingdom	The whaler was wrecked on Ocean Island. Ten of her 33 crew built a boat from the wreck and sailed to the Sandwich Islands. A schooner was sent to rescue the remaining 23 crew.
Emiline	France	The sloop was abandoned off Faial Island, Azores before 16 June.
Friheden	Norway	The ship was wrecked near Dundee, Forfarshire, United Kingdom. She was on a voyage from Dram to Dundee.
Hendricka	Netherlands	The ship was wrecked on Bodie Island, North Carolina, United States. She was on a voyage from Rotterdam, South Holland to Philadelphia, Pennsylvania, United States.
Margaret	United Kingdom	The ship was abandoned in the Atlantic Ocean with some loss of life. She was on a voyage from Belfast, County Antrim to New York, United States.
Purvoyante	France	The ship was driven ashore on Providence Atoll. She was later refloated and taken to the Seychelles.
York	United States	The frigate ran aground and sank in the Strait of Sunda. Her crew were rescued. She was on a voyage from Canton, China to New York.
