= Edward Cross (zoo proprietor) =

English zoo proprietor and dealer (1774–1854)

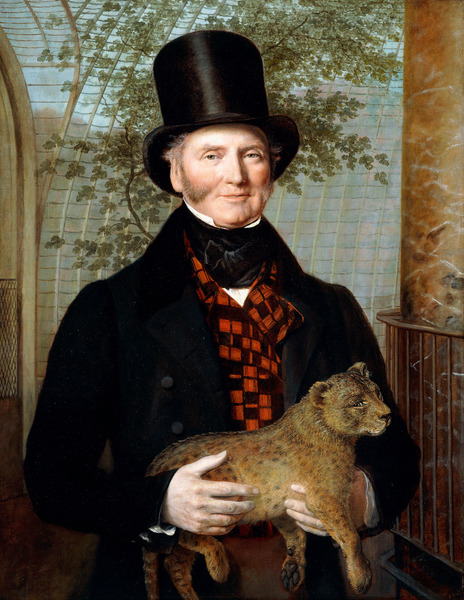
Edward Cross, painted by Jacques-Laurent Agasse in 1838

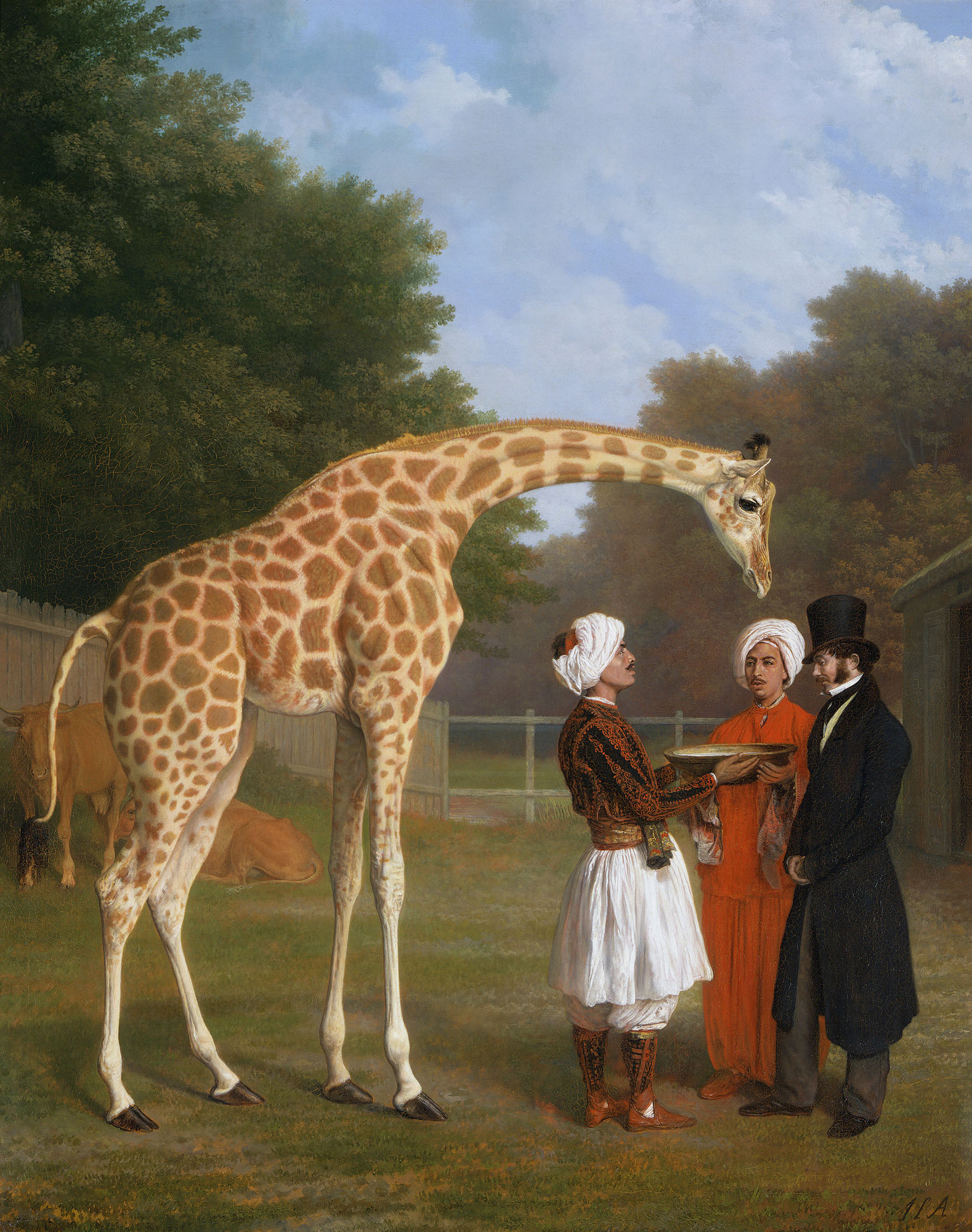
The Nubian Giraffe, by Jacques-Laurent Agasse (c.1827), depicts one of the three giraffes sent to Europe by Mehmet Ali Pasha, and its attendants. The gentleman in the top hat is Edward Cross.

Edward Cross (baptised 3 February 1774 – 26 September 1854) was an English zoo proprietor and dealer in animals.

Cross was born in London and baptised at St Andrew's, Holborn, presumably within days of his birth. Apart from the names of his parents, Walter Cross and Jane (née Callow), his early life remains obscure. He married Mary Herring.

Cross worked for Stephen Polito, the owner of the menagerie at Exeter Exchange in the Strand. Cross's daughter married Polito's brother, and Cross bought the menagerie after Polito's death in 1814. The menagerie had been operated at that site from 1773 in competition with the Royal Menagerie at the Tower of London with lions, tigers, monkeys, and other exotic species, all confined in iron cages in small rooms. The menagerie was primarily a visitor attraction open to the general public. It was visited by Wordsworth and Byron, the latter recorded watching the "tigers sup", being amused by a hyena's affection for its keeper, and the tricks played by an elephant with its trunk.

Animals in the collection were painted by Edwin Landseer and Jacques-Laurent Agasse. It was also visited by scientists such as Joshua Brookes and J. E. Gray. Gray named the Rhinoceros crossii in his honour (now as a synonym for the Sumatran rhinoceros, Dicerorhinus sumatrensis).

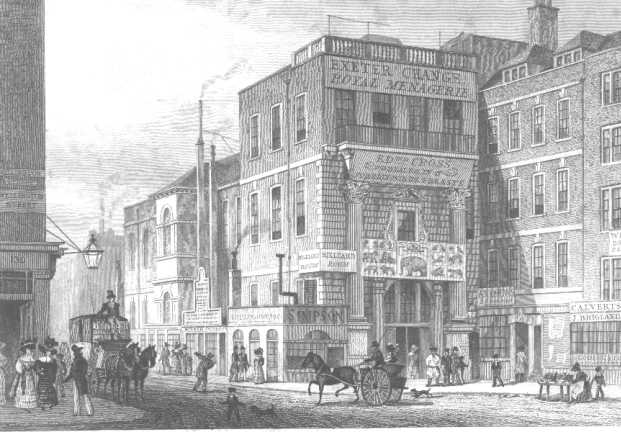
Engraving of Exeter Exchange from 1829, viewed from the east, looking west down the Strand

Cross renamed the collection the Royal Grand National Menagerie, and employed a doorkeeper who was dressed as a Yeoman of the Guard. The living conditions for the animals were so poor that negative comments were made even in the early 19th century. The situation became untenable after his elephant, Chunee, became unmanageable and killed a keeper. Chunee was finally put down by a firing squad of soldiers from Somerset House on 1 March 1826. Cross attempted to sell the collection to the new Zoological Society of London in 1826 and 1828, but the offer was refused on both occasions.

The Exeter Exchange was demolished in 1829, as part of general improvements to the Strand, and Cross moved the menagerie to the King's Mews near Trafalgar Square (now the site of the National Gallery). Some of the animals were sold to the new London Zoo in Regent's Park. In 1831, he sold the remaining animals to the Surrey Literary, Scientific and Zoological Institution – an institution that he had founded - for £3,500. Cross became superintendent of the new Surrey Zoological Gardens, and the animals were moved to Royal Surrey Gardens, in the grounds of Walworth Manor House in Kennington. Many of the exotic animals were housed in a large circular domed glass conservatory, 300 feet (90 m) in circumference with more than 6,000 square feet (600 m^{2}) of glass. The collection expanded in the following years to include lions, tigers, an Indian rhinoceros, an orang-utan, and several giraffes.

Cross retired in 1844, and he died in Kennington in 1854. His wife, Mary, had predeceased him. The zoo became run down after Cross retired, and the animals were sold off in 1856, to be replaced by Surrey Music Hall.

== Sources ==
- J. C. Edwards, ‘Cross, Edward (bap. 1774, d. 1854)’, Oxford Dictionary of National Biography, Oxford University Press, Sept 2004; online edn, Jan 2008 accessed 17 October 2008

== See also ==
- Chunee
