= Hugh Primrose Lindsay =

Hugh Primrose Lindsay (31 October 1765 – 23 April 1844) was a British naval captain, Chairman of the East India Company and Member of Parliament.

He was the 5th surviving son of James Lindsay, 5th Earl of Balcarres.

He joined the Royal Navy in 1779 and was promoted to lieutenant in 1782, but by 1787 had left the navy to join the British East India Company's (EIC) marine service, where he was promoted captain in 1793.

He served as captain of the following East Indiamen:

- Rockingham (1794–1797)
- Lady Jane Dundas (1800–1807)
- Winchelsea (1810–1811)

In 1814 he was made a director of the East India Company, a position he held unto his death, being elected deputy chairman for 1826–27 and chairman for 1827–28. In 1820 he was elected MP for Perth Burghs, sitting until 1830.

He died in London in 1844. He had married Jane, the daughter of the Hon. Alexander Gordon, Lord Rockville, with whom he had a son and a daughter. He was succeeded, after the death of his wife, by his son Hugh Hamilton Lindsay.

The EIC launched and named a paddle steamer for him: HCS Hugh Lindsay (1829).

Parliament of the United Kingdom
Preceded by Archibald Campbell	Member of Parliament for Perth Burghs; 1820–1830	Succeeded by John Stuart-Wortley-Mackenzie
Political offices
Preceded by Sir George Robinson, 1st Baronet	Chairman of the British East India Company; 1820	Succeeded by William Astell
