= Winchelsea (1803 EIC ship) =

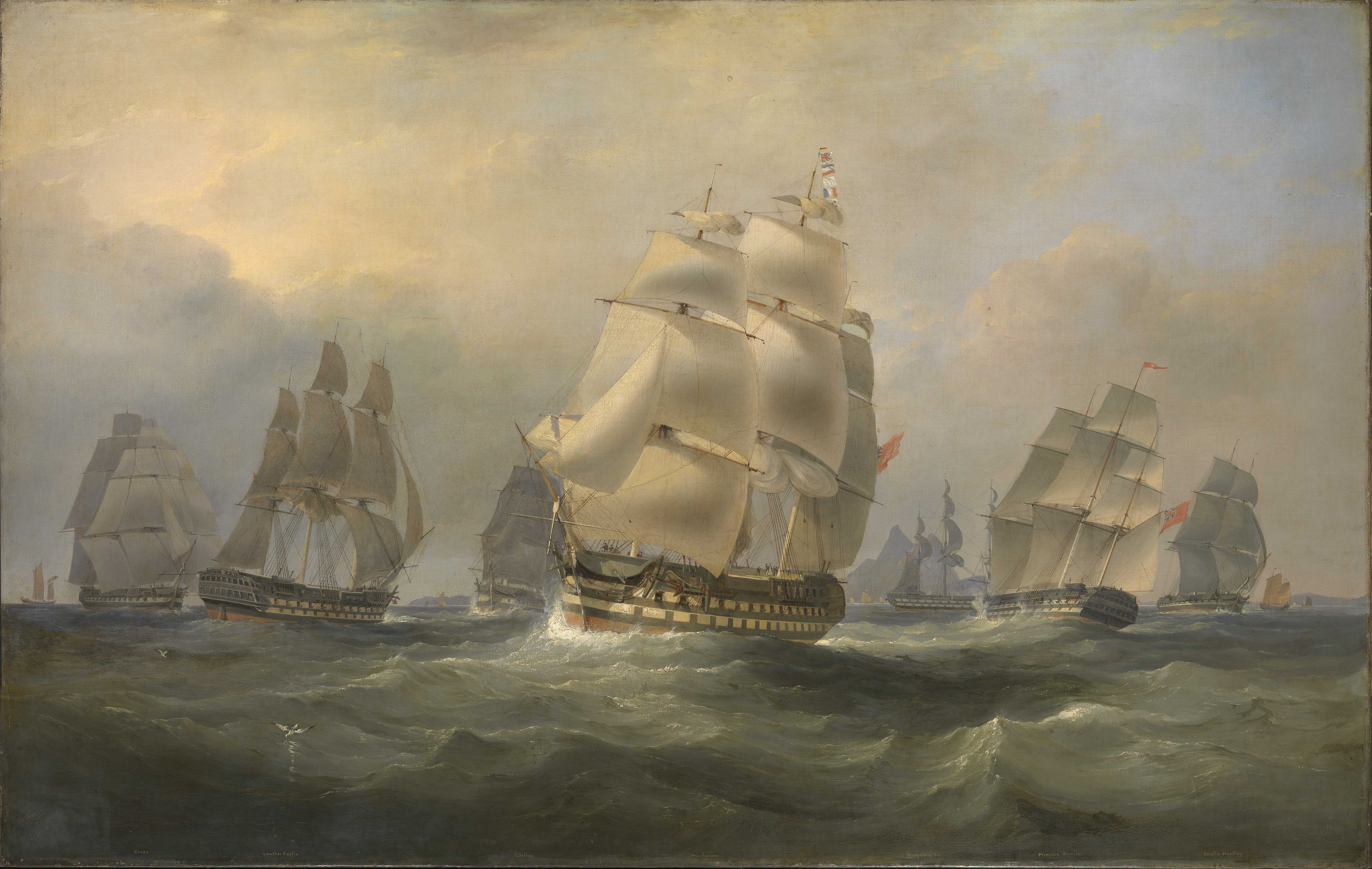
- East Indiamen in the China Seas, by Huggins. Winchelsea in the centre

History

United Kingdom
- Name: Winchelsea
- Namesake: Winchelsea (UK Parliament constituency)
- Owner: William Moffat (MP)
- Builder: Perry, Wells & Green, Blackwall
- Launched: 15 October 1803
- Fate: Broken up in 1834

General characteristics
- Tons burthen: 1265, or 1331, or 133178/94 (bm)
- Length: Overall:165 ft 4 in (50.4 m) (overall); 133 ft 6 1/2 in (40.7 m) (keel)
- Beam: 42 ft 2 1/2 in (12.9 m)
- Depth of hold: 17 ft 0 1/2 in (5.2 m)
- Complement: 1803:140; 1805:135
- Armament: 1803:38 × 18-pounder guns; 1805:38 × 18-pounder guns
- Notes: Three decks

Winchelsea was launched in 1803 as an East Indiaman for the British East India Company (EIC). She made 11 voyages for the EIC before she was broken up in 1834.

== Career ==
=== EIC voyage #1 (1804–1805) ===
Captain Walter Campbell acquired a letter of marque on 22 December 1803. He sailed from Portsmouth on 13 February 1804, bound for Bombay and China. Winchelsea arrived at Bombay on 26 May, and left on 6 August. She reached Malacca on 13 September and arrived at Whampoa anchorage on 15 October. Homeward bound, she crossed the Second Bar on 4 January 1805, reached Penang on 20 January and St Helena 28 March. She left St Helena on 11 July, and arrived at The Downs on 10 September.

=== EIC voyage #2 (1806–1807) ===
Captain William Moffat acquired a letter of marque on 19 December 1805. He sailed from Portsmouth on 4 March 1806, bound for Bombay and China. Winchelsea arrived at Bombay on 20 June and left on 12 August. She reached Penang on 4 Sep Penang and arrived at Whampoa on 30 October. Homeward bound, she crossed the Second Bar on 6 January 1807, reached Penang on 22 January and St Helena on 17 April, and arrived at The Downs on 2 July.

=== EIC voyage #3 (1808–1809) ===
Captain Moffat sailed from Portsmouth on 9 February 1808, bound for Bombay and China. Winchelsea arrived back at her moorings on 12 September 1809, with an elephant on board.

"Mr Polito ... has obtained possession of a remarkably fine Elephant, brought to England in the Hon. East India Company's ship, Winchelsea, Capt. William Moffat, which will be exhibited at Rumsey [sic] fair on Monday; and it is expected he will be offered for public inspection for a day or two, in this town [Winchester], on his way to the Exeter 'Change London." (Note: The EIC ship Walthamstow in June 1810 brought another elephant to England, this one from Sri Lanka. However, neither Winchelsea's elephant nor Walthamstow's were Chunee, who was part of the menagerie at the Exeter Exchange in the Strand, London. Chunee travelled on the East Indiaman, Astell, from Bengal, arriving in England in July 1811.)

=== EIC voyage #4 (1810–1811) ===
Captain the Honourable Hugh Lindsay sailed from Portsmouth on 21 January 1810, bound for Bombay and China. Winchelsea reached the Cape of Good Hope on 9 April and arrived at Bombay on 26 May. She left Bombay on 12 August, reached Penang on 31 August, and arrived at Whampoa on 12 October. Homeward bound, she crossed the Second Bar on 11 February 1811, reached St Helena on 28 May, and arrived at The Downs on 8 August.

=== EIC voyage #5 (1812–1813) ===
Captain William Moffat sailed from Portsmouth on 1 March 1812, bound for Madras and China. Winchelsea reached Madras on 11 June and Penang on 2 August, and arrived at Whampoa on 7 September. Homeward bound, she crossed the Second Bar on 17 January 1813, reached St Helena on 6 April, and arrived at The Downs on 5 June.

=== EIC voyage #6 (1814–1815) ===
Captain Moffat sailed from Portsmouth on 22 February 1814, bound for Madras and China. Winchelsea reached Johanna on 6 June, and arrived at Madras on 4 July. Sailing on, she reached Penang on 21 August, Malacca on 16 September and "Linton" (Lintin on 20 October. She left Linton on 27 November and arrived at Whampoa on 2 December. Homeward bound, she crossed the Second Bar on 20 January 1815, reached St Helena on 19 April, and arrived at The Downs on 24 June.

=== EIC voyage #7 (1817–1818) ===
(7) 1816/7 China. Capt William Adamson sailed from The Downs on 5 March 1817, bound for China. Winchelsea reached Penang on 4 July and Malacca on 6 August, and arrived at Whampoa on 12 September. Homeward bound, she crossed the Second Bar on 29 November 1817.

Winchelsea was sailing in company with Waterloo. On 1 January 1818 Waterloo grounded in the Sunda Strait. They were still there 12 days later and informed a passing vessel that they intended to sail for the Cape.

Winchelsea reached the Cape on 20 February 1818 and St Helena on 13 March, and arrived at The Downs on 11 May.

When Winchelsea assisted Waterloo, Winchelsea had taken aboard heavy goods worth £8,000 to lighten Waterloo, and Captain Birch of Waterloo thanked Adamson for his assistance. On Winchelsea's return to London, Moffat sued the EIC for salvage. The EIC argued that the two vessels had sailed in company for mutual assistance and that later Waterloo had assisted Winchelsee. The court awarded Winchelsea £4000, of which £2000 went to Moffat, £500 went to Adamson, and £1500 went to the officers and crew in the same proportions as would apply to prizes.

=== EIC voyage #8 (1820–1821) ===
Captain William Adamson sailed from The Downs on 15 March 1820, bound for St Helena and China. Winchelsea reached St Helena on 18 May and arrived at Whampoa on 10 October. Homeward bound, she crossed the Second Bar on 20 February 1821, reached St Helena on 13 May, and arrived at The Downs on 21 July.

=== EIC voyage #9 (1822–1823) ===
(9) 1821/2 Bengal. Captain William Adamson sailed from The Downs on 13 June 1822, bound for Bengal. Winchelsea arrived at Saugor on 9 November. Homeward bound, she was at Saugor again on 29 January 1823. On 10 February she was at 1°21′N 85°35′E, when she experienced the effects of an earthquake. She was carrying 550 people, including the 17th Regiment of Foot and detachments of the King's and company's soldiers.

She reached St Helena on 3 April and arrived at The Downs on 24 May.

Currently, Winchelsea's whereabouts in the period 1824-25 are unknown.

=== EIC voyage #10 (1826–1827) ===
Captain Roger B. Everest sailed from The Downs on 18 July 1826, bound for China. Winchelsea arrived at Whampoa on 24 December. Homeward bound, she crossed the Second Bar on 11 February 1827, reached St Helena on 25 April, and arrived at The Downs on 3 June.

Currently, Winchelsea's whereabouts in the period 1827-31 are unknown.

=== EIC voyage #11 (1831–1832) ===
Captain Patrick Henry Burt (or Birt), sailed from The Downs on 7 May 1831, bound for China. Winchelsea became leaky and put into Cork on 10 May; she returned to The Downs on 8 June, and left again on 18 August. She arrived at Whampoa on 28 January 1832. Homeward bound, she crossed the Second Bar on 3 March, reached St Helena on 5 June, and arrived at The Downs on 6 August.

== Fate ==
In 1834 Winchelsea was sold for breaking up, after having been laid up.
