= HMS Winchelsea =

Seven ships of the Royal Navy have borne the name HMS Winchelsea, or the archaic variant HMS Winchelsey, after the Sussex town of Winchelsea:

- HMS Winchelsey (1694) was a 32-gun fifth rate launched in 1694 and captured by four French privateers in 1706.
- HMS Winchelsey (1706) was a 26-gun fifth rate launched in 1706 and lost in a hurricane in 1707.
- HMS Winchelsey (1708) was a 36-gun fifth rate purchased in 1708. She was captured by the French in 1709, but was retaken a month later. She was reduced to a sixth rate in 1716 and was broken up in 1735.
- HMS Winchelsea (1740) was a 20-gun sixth rate launched in 1740. She was captured by the French in 1758, but was retaken two weeks later. She was broken up in 1761.
- HMS Winchelsea (1763) was a cutter purchased in 1763 and sunk as a breakwater in 1774.
- HMS Winchelsea (1764) was a 32-gun fifth rate launched in 1764. She was rebuilt in 1782, converted into a prison ship in 1805 and was sold in 1814.
- HMS Winchelsea (D46) was an Admiralty W-class destroyer launched in 1917. She was converted to an escort destroyer in 1942 and was sold in 1945.

== See also ==
- Winchelsea (1803 EIC ship), an East Indiaman
