= Stephen Polito =

British circus proprietor

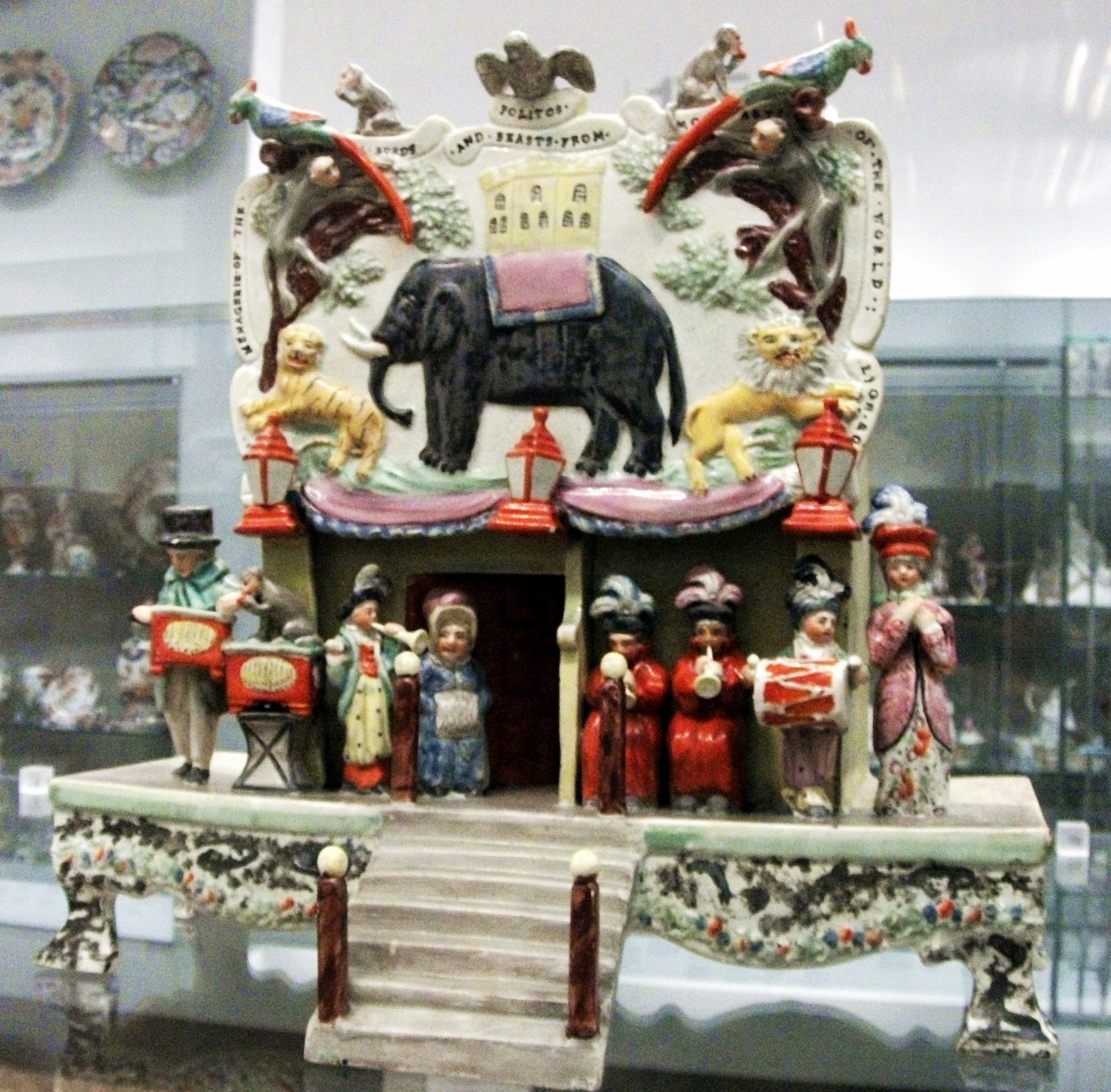
Staffordshire pottery flat back mantelpiece ornament, c. 1830 of the Menagerie of the Polito family.

Stephen Polito (also known as Stephano, Stephani and Stephanus Polito; 1763/64–1814) was a menagerie owner of Italian descent in Georgian England.

Polito was born in Moltrasio, Italy. He owned a menagerie which he toured around England in the late 18th century. He went into partnership with another menagerist named Miles in 1798, and "Miles and Polito's Menagerie" exhibited at St Bartholomew's Fair in 1799. Polito's menagerie also attended Nottingham Goose Fair in 1807.

Polito acquired the permanent menagerie at Exeter Exchange in the Strand in London from the Pidcock family in 1810, and renamed it the Royal Menagerie. He continued to tour in the summer, and exhibited his animals at Exeter Exchange in the winter. The menagerie at Exeter Exchange was very popular during Polito's short period of ownership. It was visited by William Wordsworth and Lord Byron, and animals in his collection were painted by Edwin Landseer and Jacques-Laurent Agasse. The menagerie included exotic animals, including an elephant, Chunee, which was put down in 1826 after killing a keeper and becoming ungovernable and in a permanently enraged state due to musth and a painful rotten tusk.

The collection was acquired by his brother, John, after his death, and then by a former employee, Edward Cross (also John's father in law). Cross continued to tour under the name "Polito's Menagerie". It is represented on pearlware pottery from the 1830s.
