= Jacques-Laurent Agasse =

Swiss painter (1767–1849)

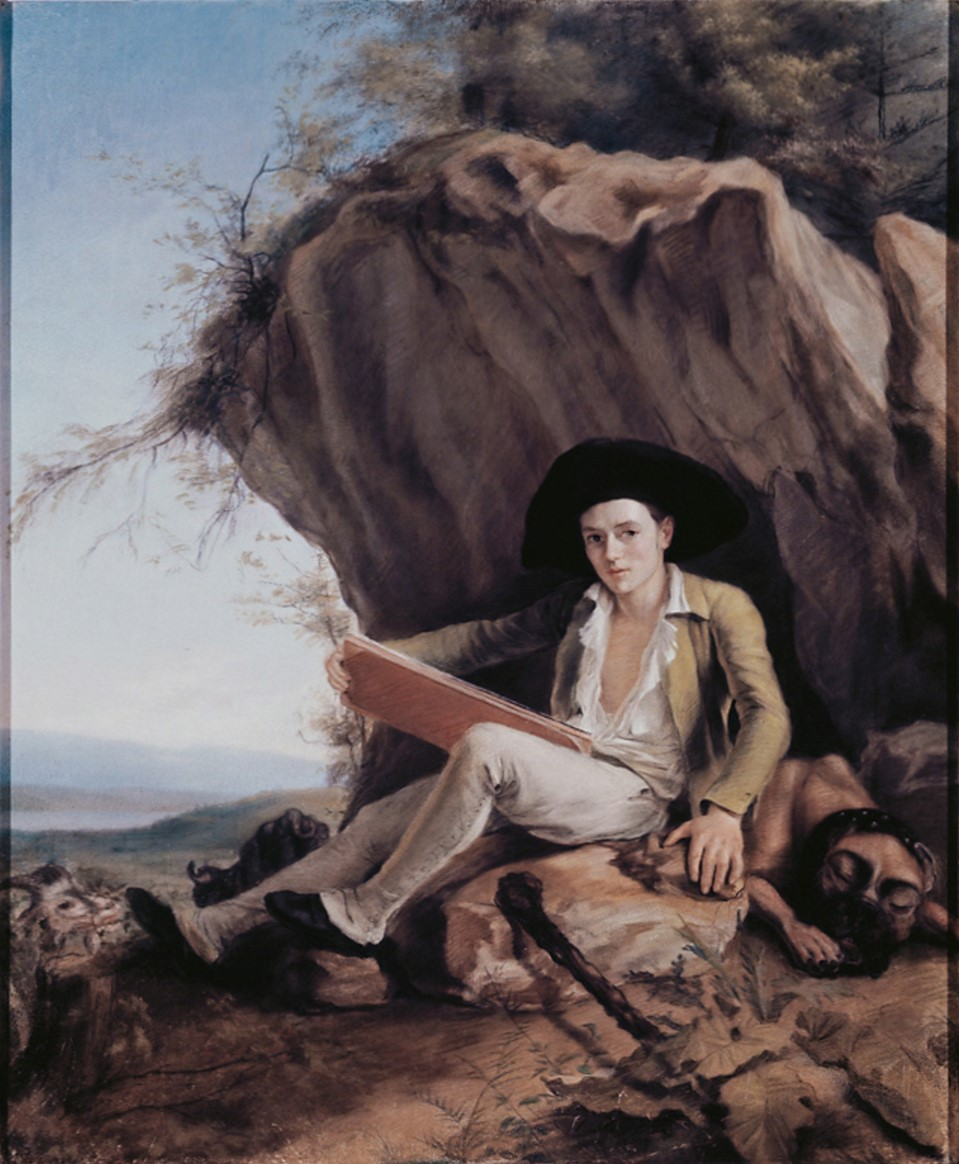
Portrait by Firmin Massot, c. 1785

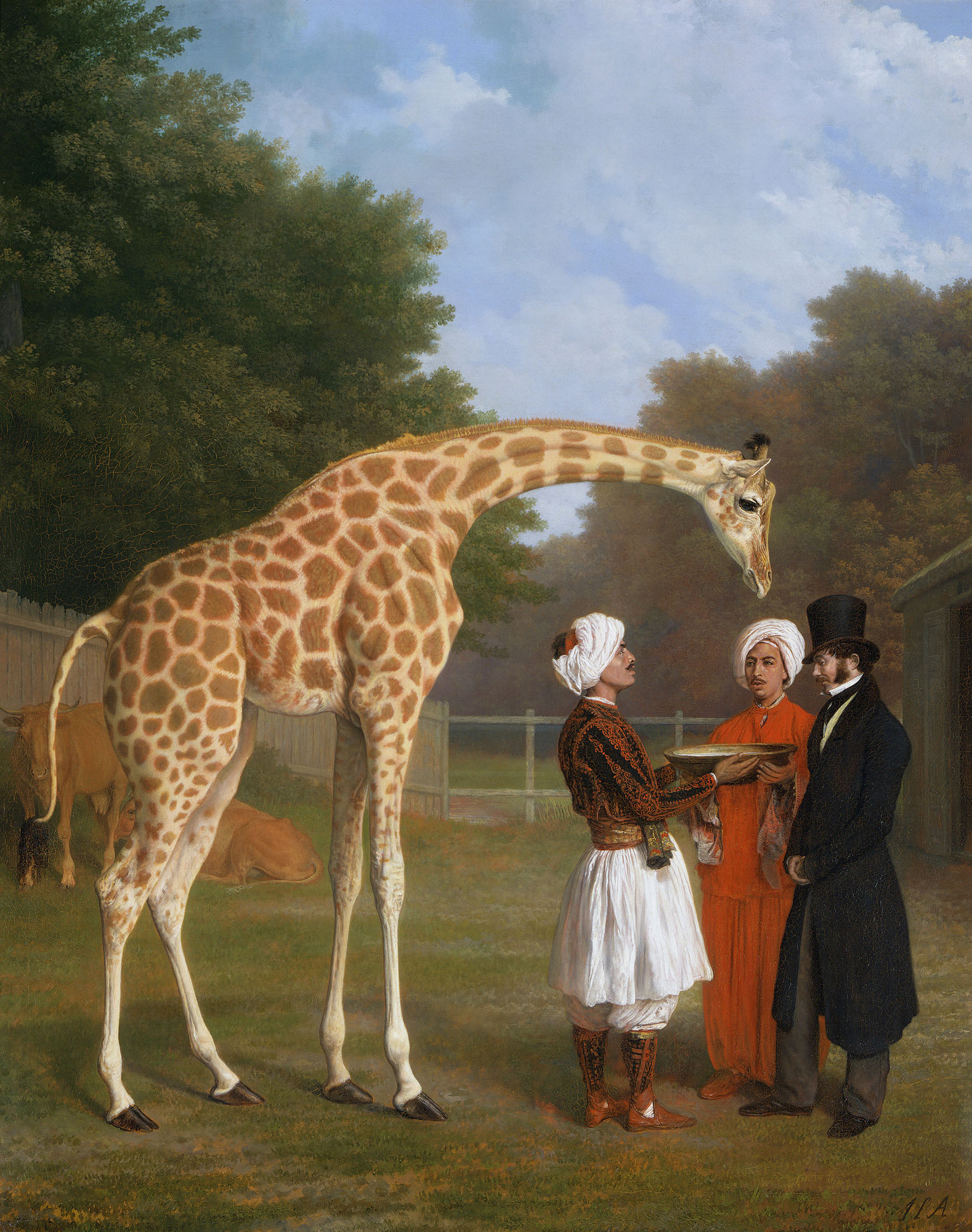
The Nubian Giraffe, by Jacques-Laurent Agasse (c.1827), depicts one of the three giraffes sent to Europe by Mehmet Ali Pasha (another was Zarafa). This one was received by George IV in London. The gentleman shown in the top hat is Edward Cross, operator of the menagerie at Exeter Exchange and then Royal Surrey Gardens. Agasse painted many other animals from his collection.

Jacques-Laurent Agasse (April 24, 1767 – December 27, 1849) was an animal and landscape painter from Switzerland.

Born at Geneva, Agasse studied in the public art school of that city. Before he turned twenty he went to Paris to study in veterinary school to make himself fully acquainted with the anatomy of horses and other animals. He seems to have subsequently returned to Switzerland. The Tübinger Morgenblatt (1808, p. 876) says that "Agasse, the celebrated animal painter, now in England, owed his fortune to an accident. About eight years ago, he being then in Switzerland, a rich Englishman (George Pitt, later Lord Rivers) asked him to paint his favourite dog (greyhound) which had died. The Englishman was so pleased with his work that he took the painter to England with him."

Nagler says that he was one of the most celebrated animal painters at the end of the 18th and the beginning of the 19th century. In Johann Georg Meusel's Neue Miscellaneen (viii. 1052 et seq.), he compares Agasse and Wouwermans, wholly in favour of the former. In that partial article much is said of his extreme devotion to art, of his marvelous knowledge of anatomy, of his special fondness for the English racehorses, and his excellence in depicting them. He appears first in the academy catalogues in 1801 as the exhibitor of the 'Portrait of a Horse', and continued to exhibit more or less until 1845 (contradicting Nagler's statement that he died "about" 1806).

In the catalogues his name is given as J.L. Agasse or Agassé. The number of times Agassé changed his address confirms Redgrave's assertion that "he lived poor and died poor". The writer of the panegyric already quoted says, however, that he did not work for money, but that he was urged forward by the resistless force of natural genius.

== Gallery ==
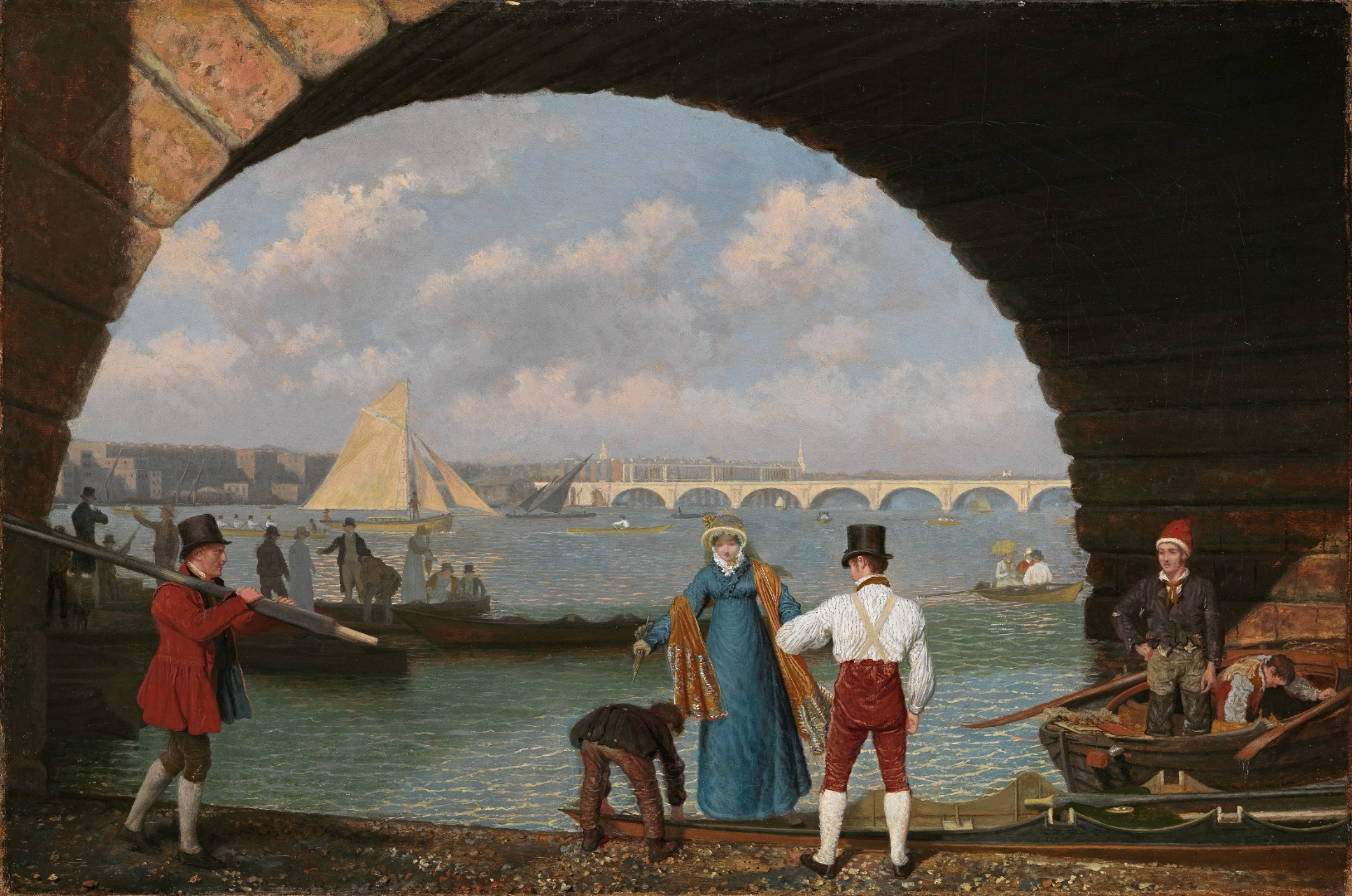
Landing at Westminster Bridge, 1818, oil on canvas, Oskar Reinhart Foundation, Winterthur

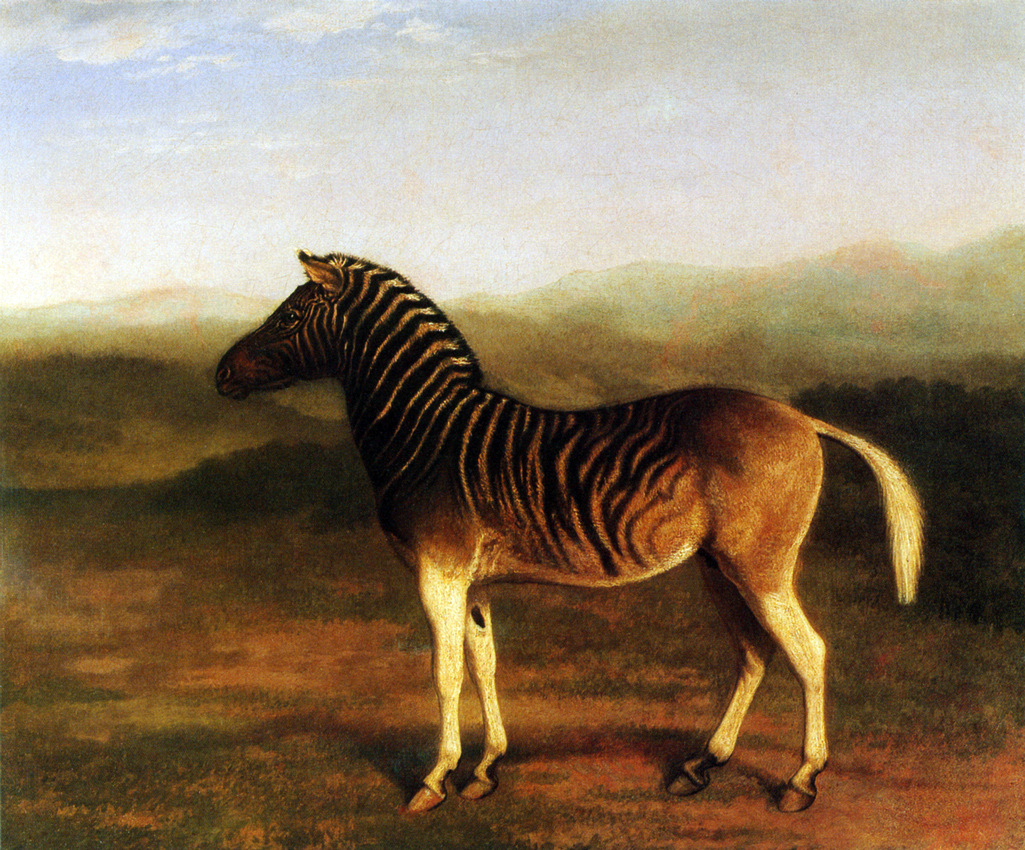
Male Quagga, early 1800s, Royal College of Surgeons

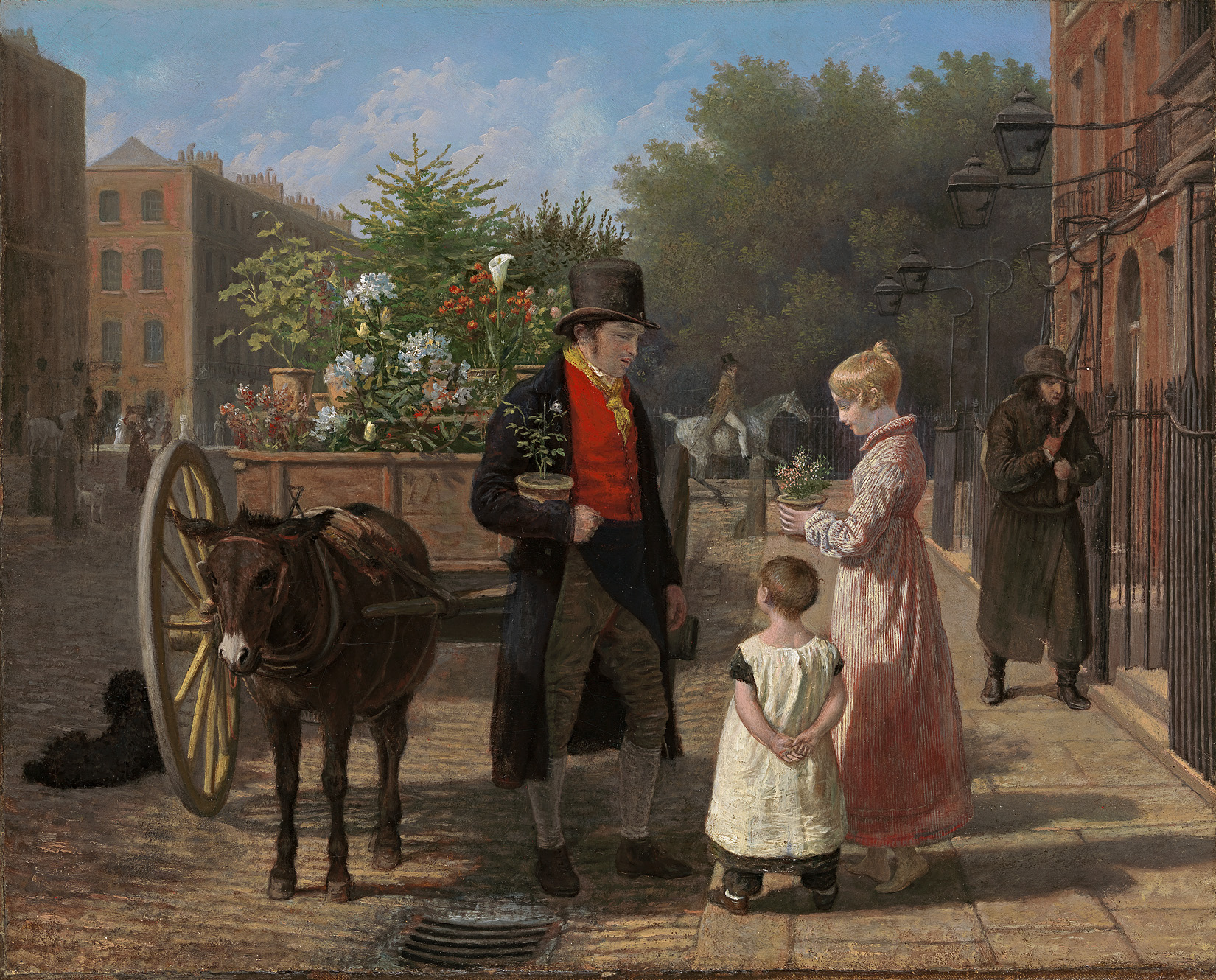
Flower Seller, 1822, oil on canvas, Oskar Reinhart Collection, Winterthur

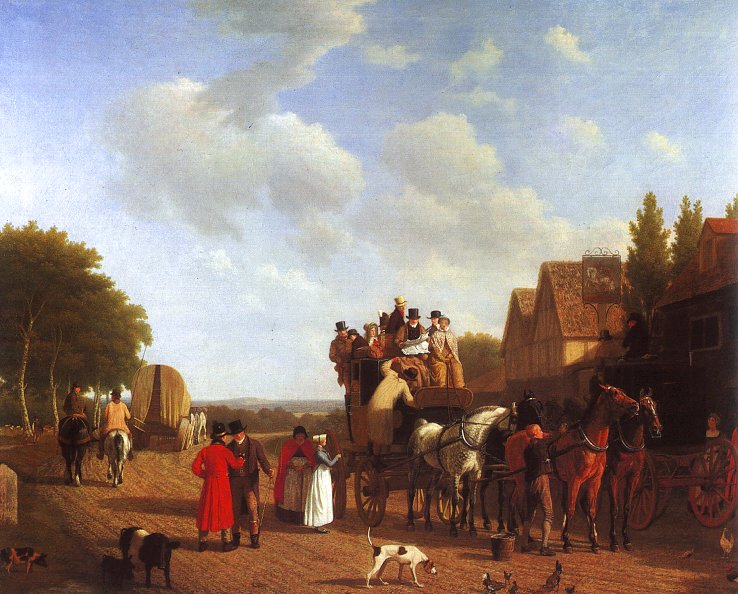
The Last Stage on the Portsmouth Road, 1815, oil on canvas, Oskar Reinhart Foundation, Winterthur

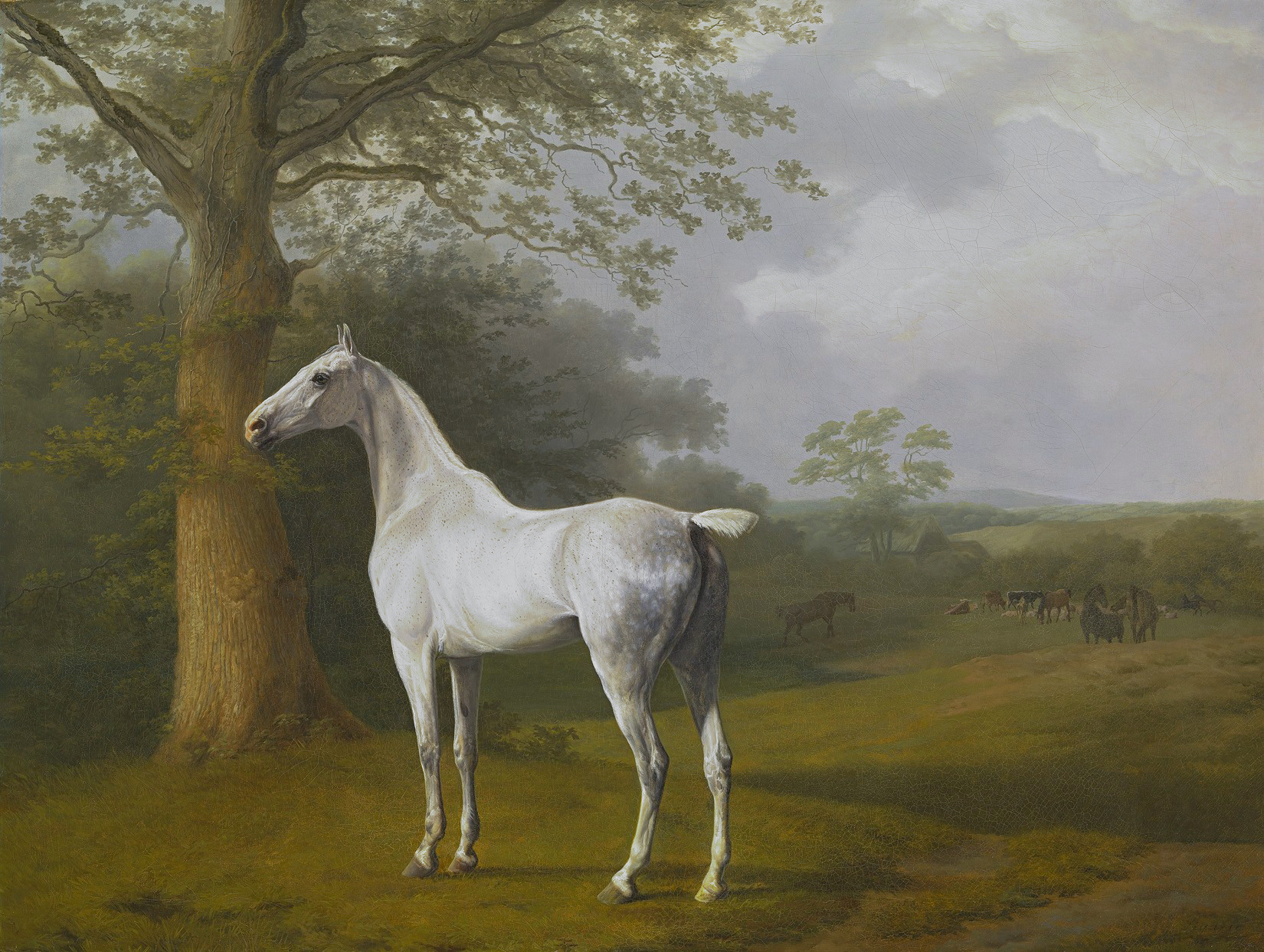
White Horse in Pasture, 1806–1807, oil on canvas, Oskar Reinhart Foundation, Winterthur

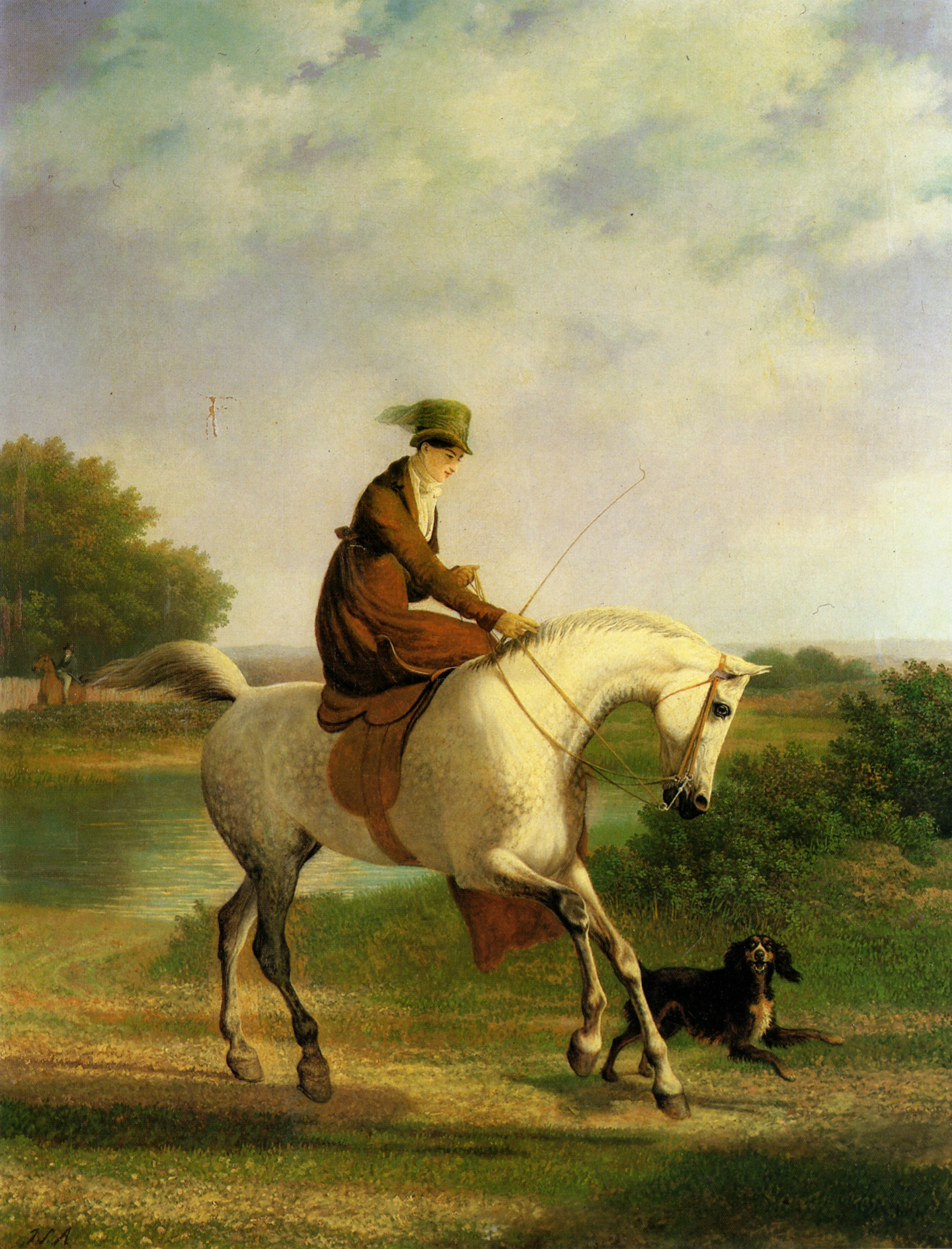
Emma Powles

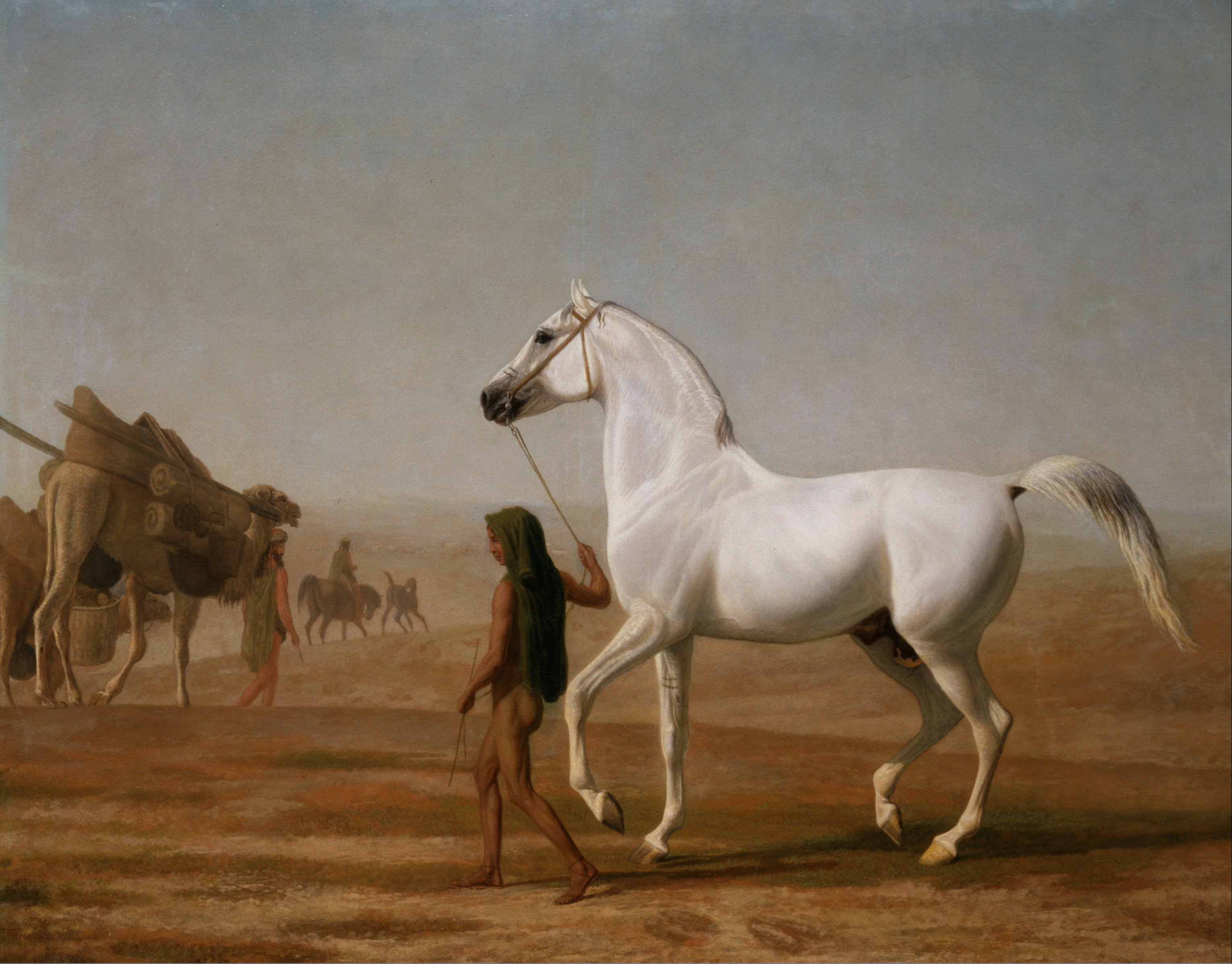
The Wellesley Grey Arabian Led through the Desert

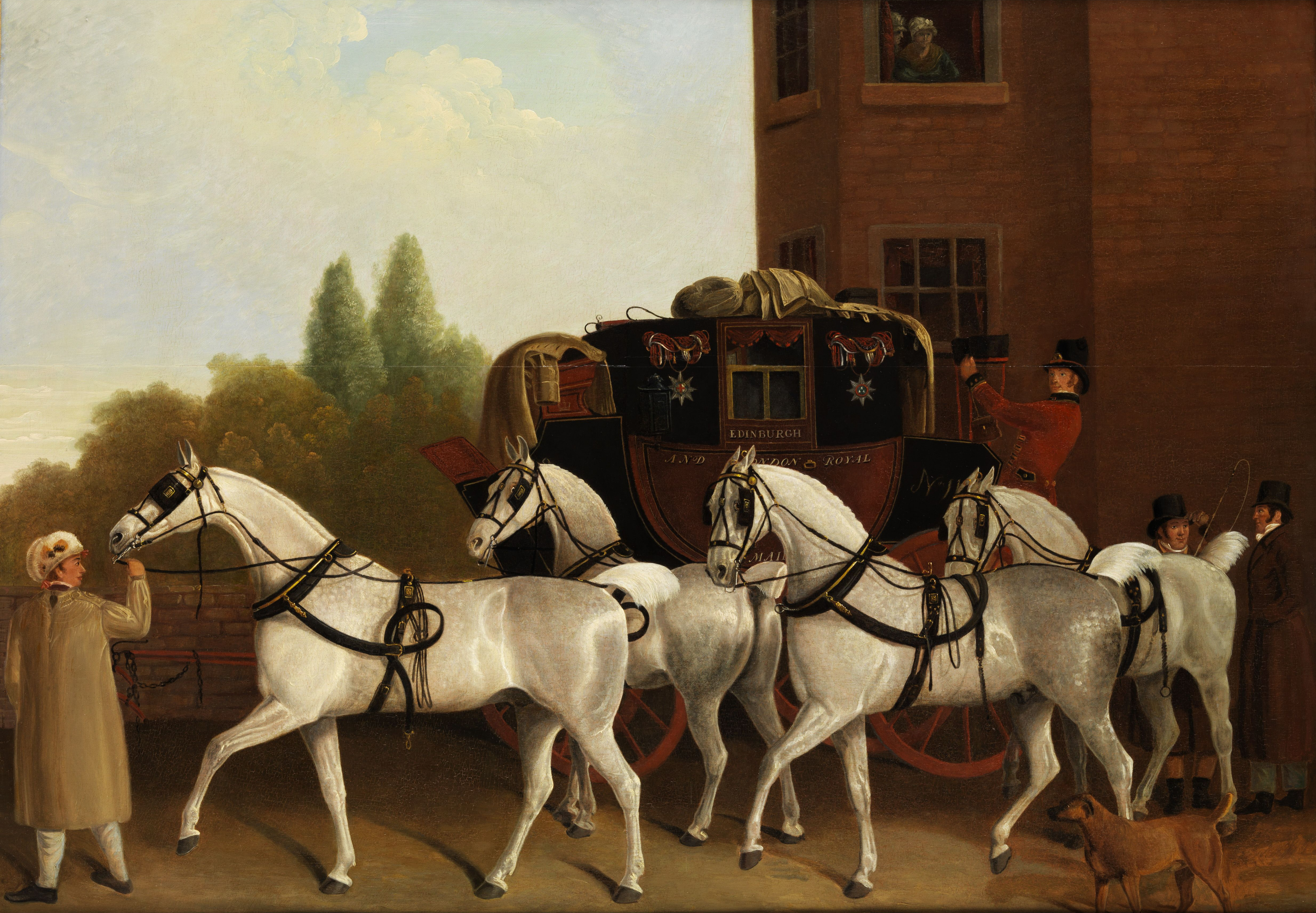
Edinburgh and London Royal Mail

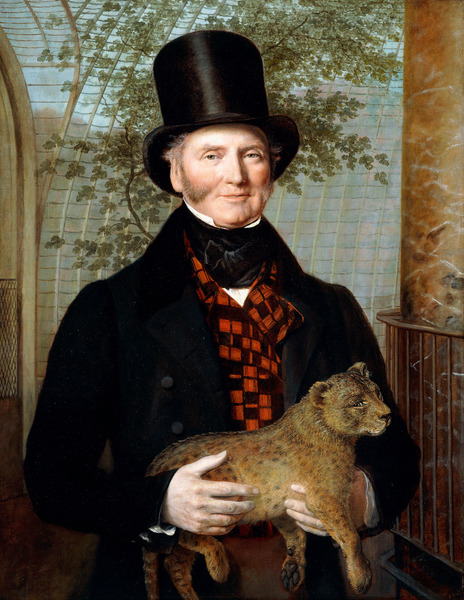
Edward Cross (1774–1854), zoo proprietor.

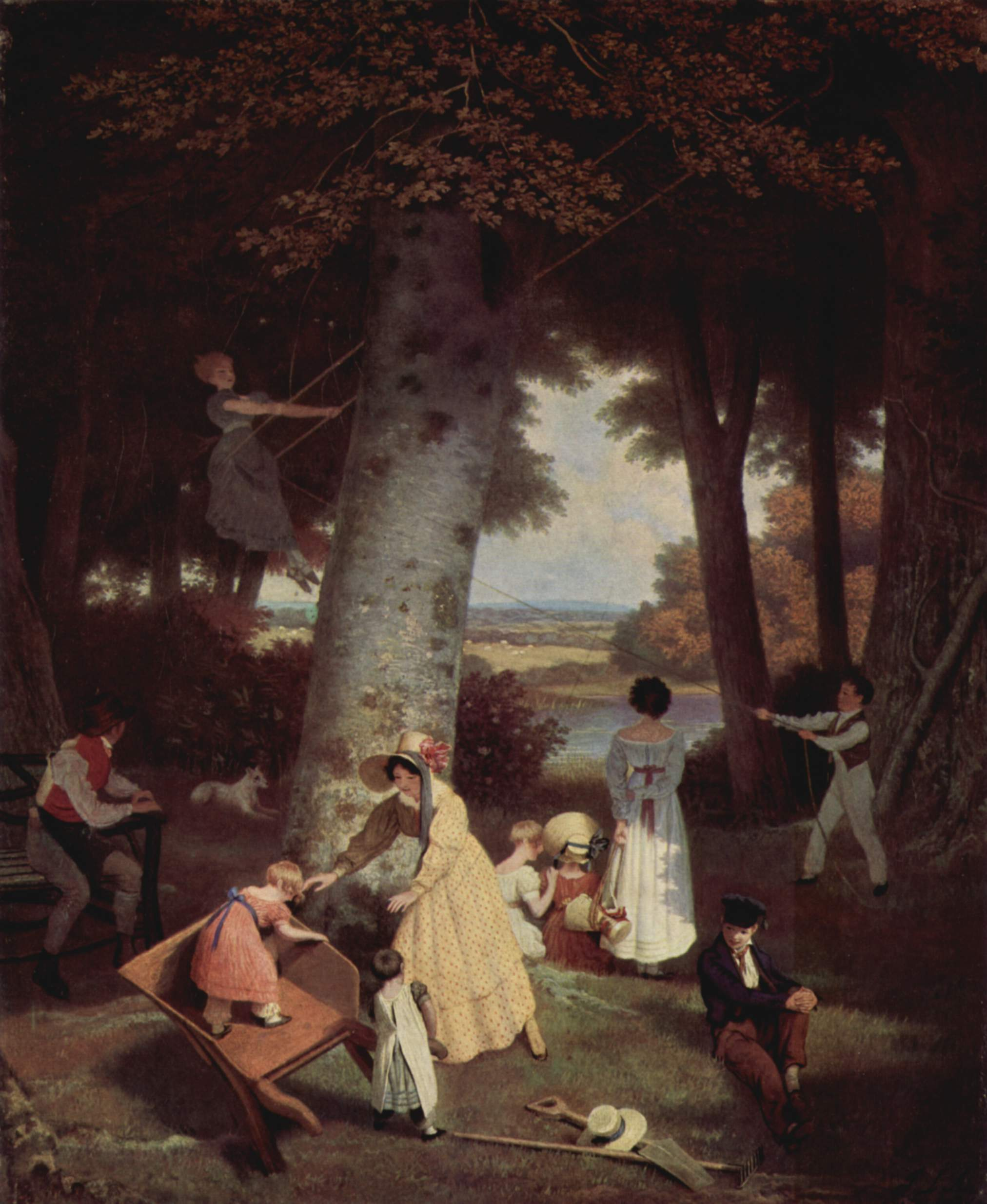
The playground
