= Royal Surrey Gardens =

Pleasure gardens in Surrey, England

Coordinates: 51°29′20″N 0°6′7″W

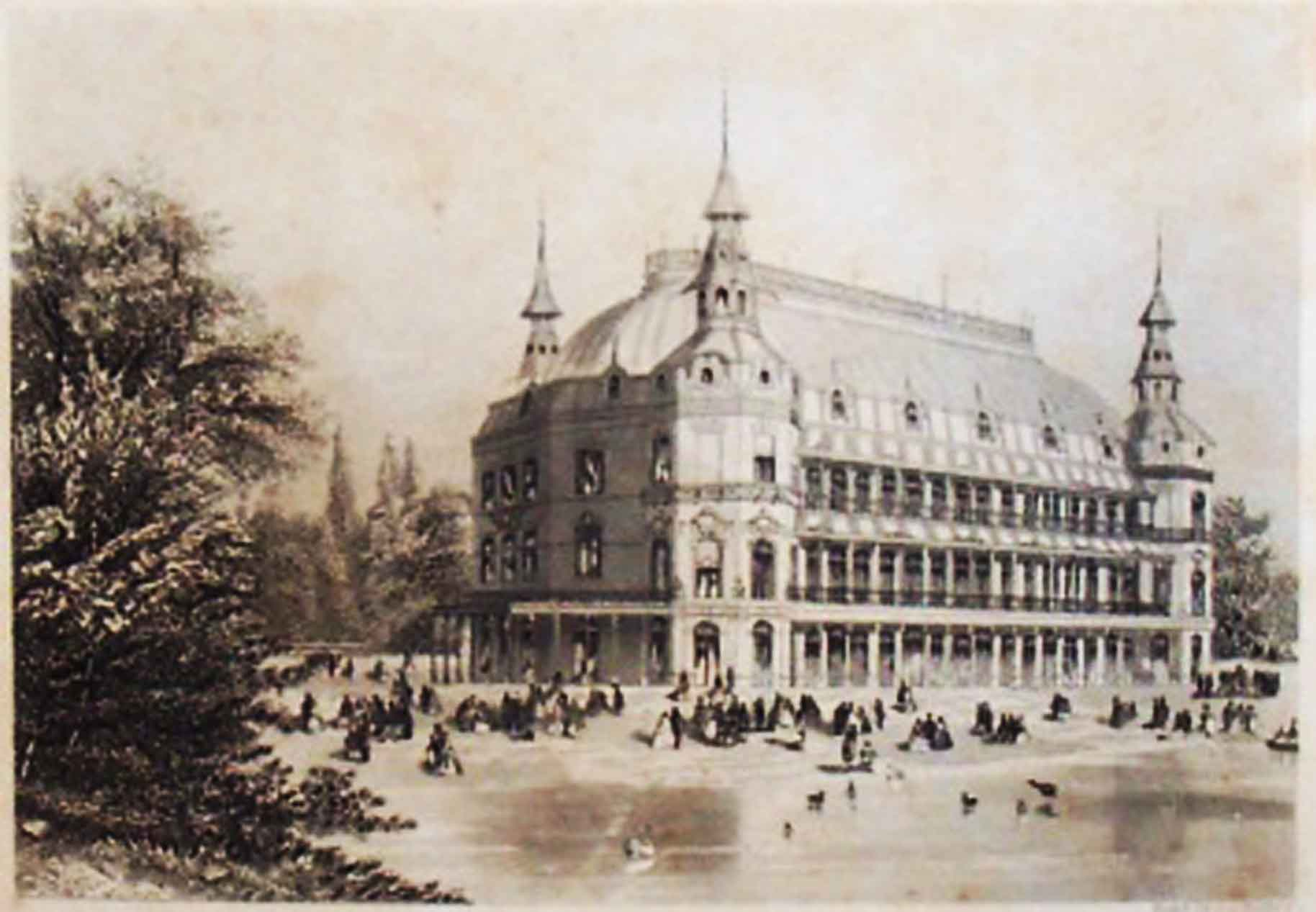
Surrey Music Hall ca. 1858

Royal Surrey Gardens were pleasure gardens in Newington, Surrey, London in the Victorian period, slightly east of The Oval. The gardens occupied about 15 acres (6.1 ha) to the east side of Kennington Park Road, including a lake of about 3 acres (1.2 ha). It was the site of Surrey Zoological Gardens and Surrey Music Hall.

The gardens were the grounds of the manor house of Walworth, that is also the civil parish of Newington, Surrey. The site was acquired in 1831 by impresario Edward Cross to be the location of his new Surrey Zoological Gardens, using animals from his menagerie at Exeter Exchange, in competition with the new London Zoo in Regent's Park. A large circular domed glass conservatory was built in the gardens, 300 feet (90 m) in circumference with more than 6,000 square feet (560 m^{2}) of glass, to contain separate cages for lions, tigers, a rhinoceros, and giraffes. The gardens were heavily planted with native and exotic trees and plants, and dotted with picturesque pavilions.

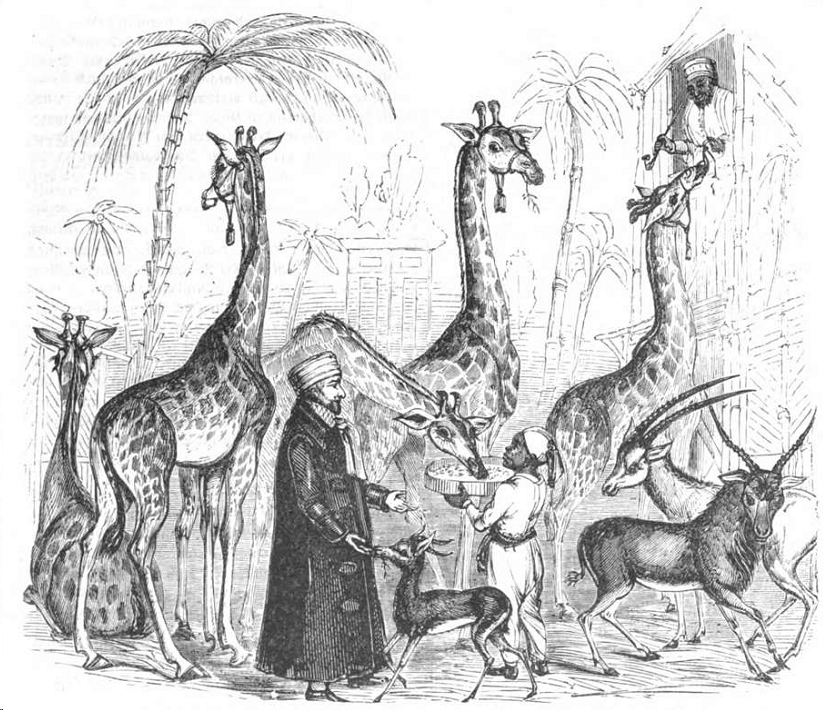
Surrey Gardens in 1842

The gardens were used for large public entertainments from 1837, such as re-enactments of the eruption of Mount Vesuvius, the Great Fire of London, or the storming of Badajoz, using large painted sets up to 80 feet (24 m) high, and spectacular firework displays, as had become popular at Vauxhall Gardens before its demise. Later, it was used for promenade concerts. The gardens suffered intense competition from the Great Exhibition at the Crystal Palace in 1851.

== Surrey Music Hall ==
After Cross's death, the gardens were acquired by a company. The zoo had become run down, and the animals were sold off in 1856 to build Surrey Music Hall in the gardens.

It was a large, rectangular building of three floors, with an arcade around the ground floor and two covered galleries above, and octagonal staircases at each corner with ornamental turrets. Like the Crystal Palace, it was largely constructed from cast iron, and was capable of holding 12,000 seated spectators, making it the largest venue in London. It was used to celebrate the return of soldiers at the end of the Crimean War in 1856, and for a four-day military festival from 27 July to 30 July 1857 to honour and raise funds for Mary Seacole. The French popular and eccentric conductor and composer of light music Louis Antoine Jullien gave numerous very successful concerts in the Royal Surrey Gardens in 1855 and 1856 mixing classical and dance music.

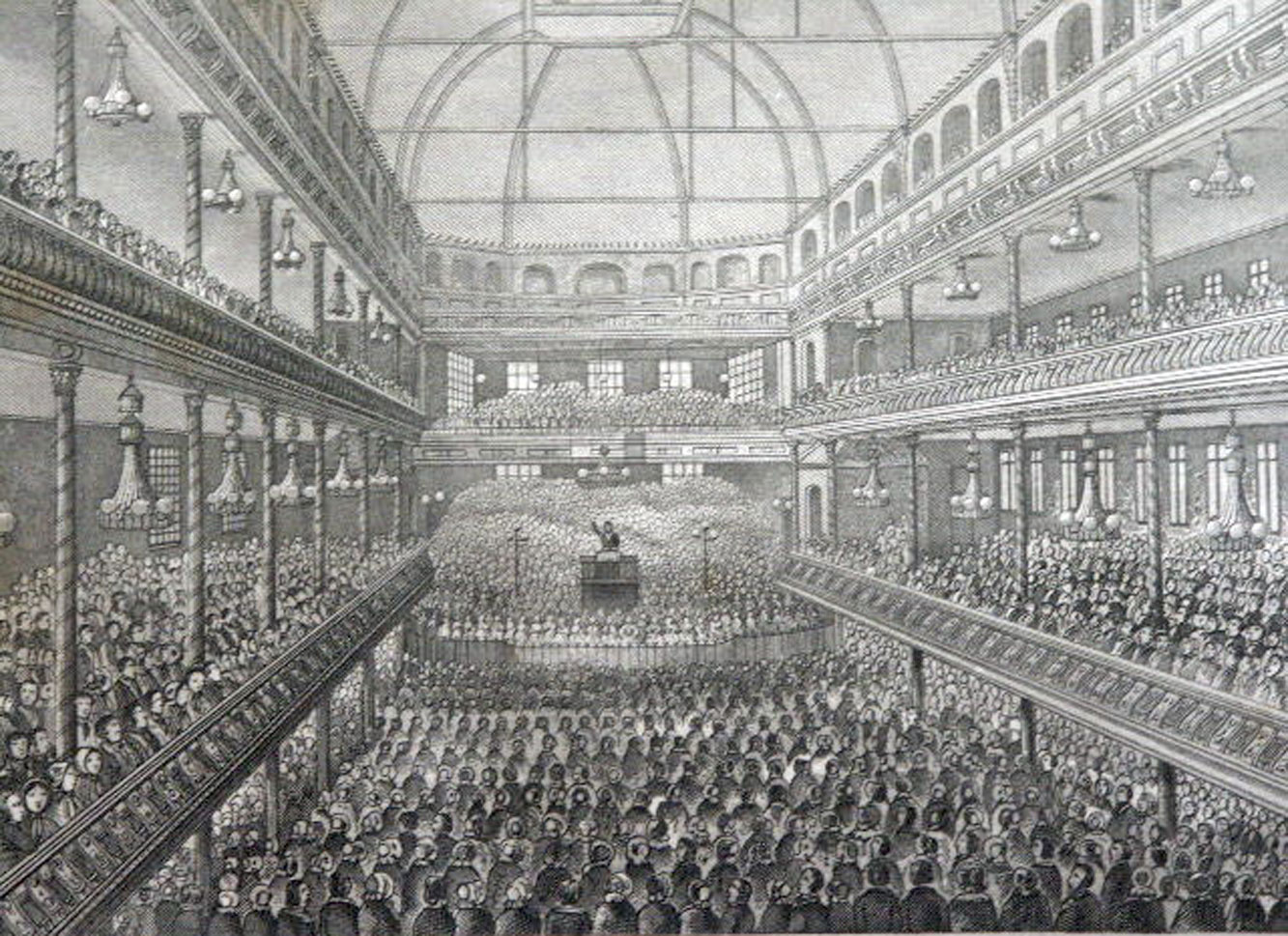
Charles Spurgeon preaching in a packed Surrey Music Hall in around 1858.

The famous Baptist preacher Charles Spurgeon held religious services at the Music Hall on weekends because the New Park Street Chapel could not contain his audiences. The first service was held on the evening of Sunday 19 October 1856, with an audience of 10,000 inside and as many outside unable to enter. It was, however, marred by tragedy when someone shouted fire and a panic to escape ensued. Seven were killed in the crush and many injured. Nevertheless, Spurgeon returned a few weeks later to hold morning services in November 1856. The services continued to be very well attended, with audiences exceeding 10,000. The proprietors decided to hold Sunday evening music concerts in the hall; Spurgeon objected to the entertainment being held on the Sabbath, and the last Sunday morning service was held on 11 December 1859.

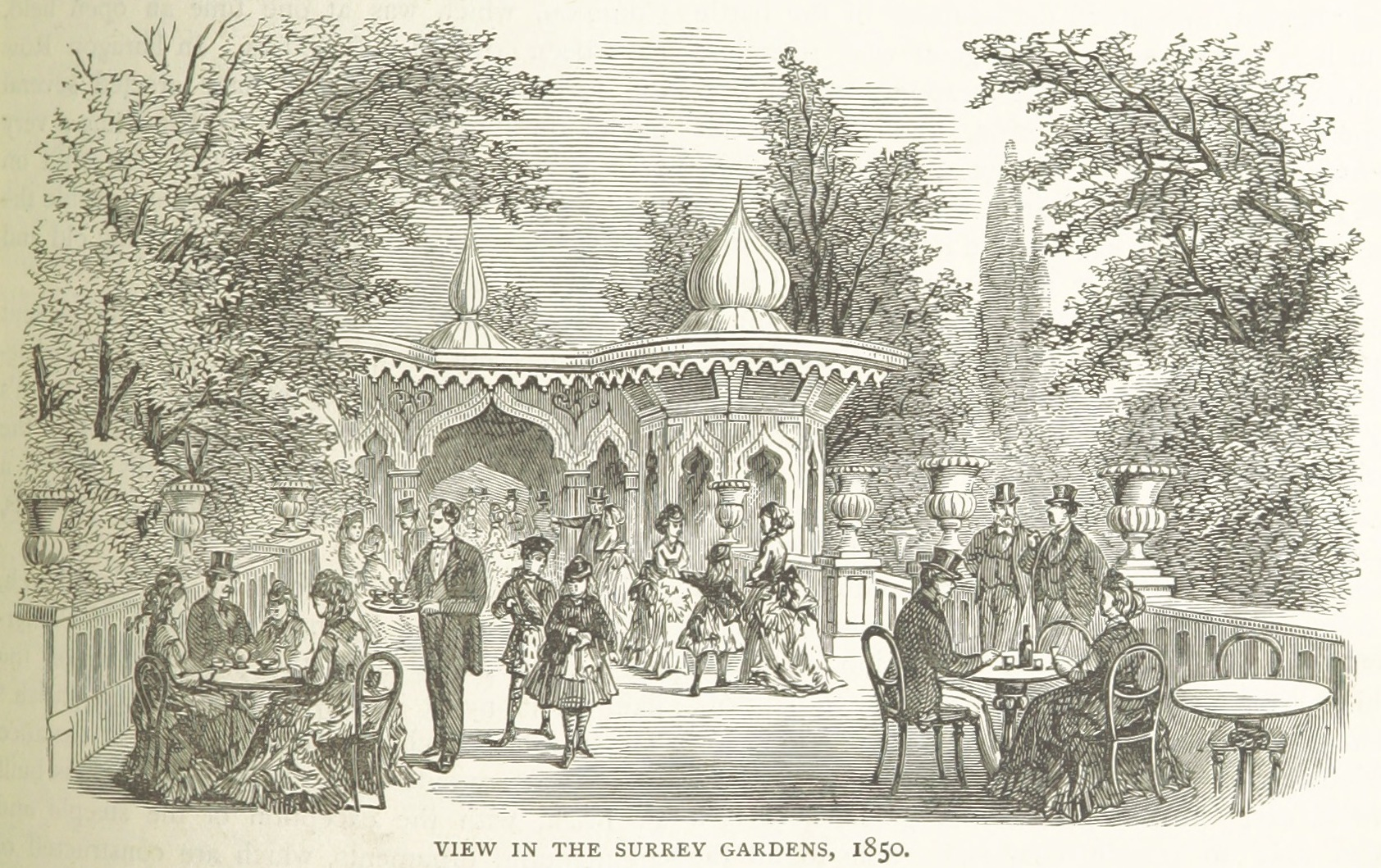
Surrey Gardens in 1850

The music hall was destroyed by fire in 1861, leading to a High Court legal case, Taylor v. Caldwell (1863) 3 B & S 328, to recover the costs of printing posters for an event that could not be held at the hall as a result of its destruction. The case established the doctrine of impossibility in English contract law.

The gardens returned to holding large public entertainments, but they were less successful than before, and the gardens finally closed in 1862. St. Thomas' Hospital moved to the site temporarily, while its new buildings at the new Albert Embankment, Lambeth Palace Road, near Westminster Bridge, were being constructed. Its previous buildings had been sold for the railway viaduct built to connect London Bridge railway station to Cannon Street, Blackfriars and Charing Cross railway stations.

== Pasley Park ==
The gardens were sold for the development of residential buildings in 1877. Surrey Gardens re-opened as a much smaller public park in the 1980s, called Pasley Park. There is an information board about the history of Surrey Gardens, and, as a reference back to the former use, there are two ostrich sculptures. The Southwark flag pole is decorated as if it is a giraffe's neck. In 2015, a plaque was unveiled in the park to Sgt Frank Stubbs VC.
