= Chunee =

India-born British menagerie elephant put down after becoming ungovernable

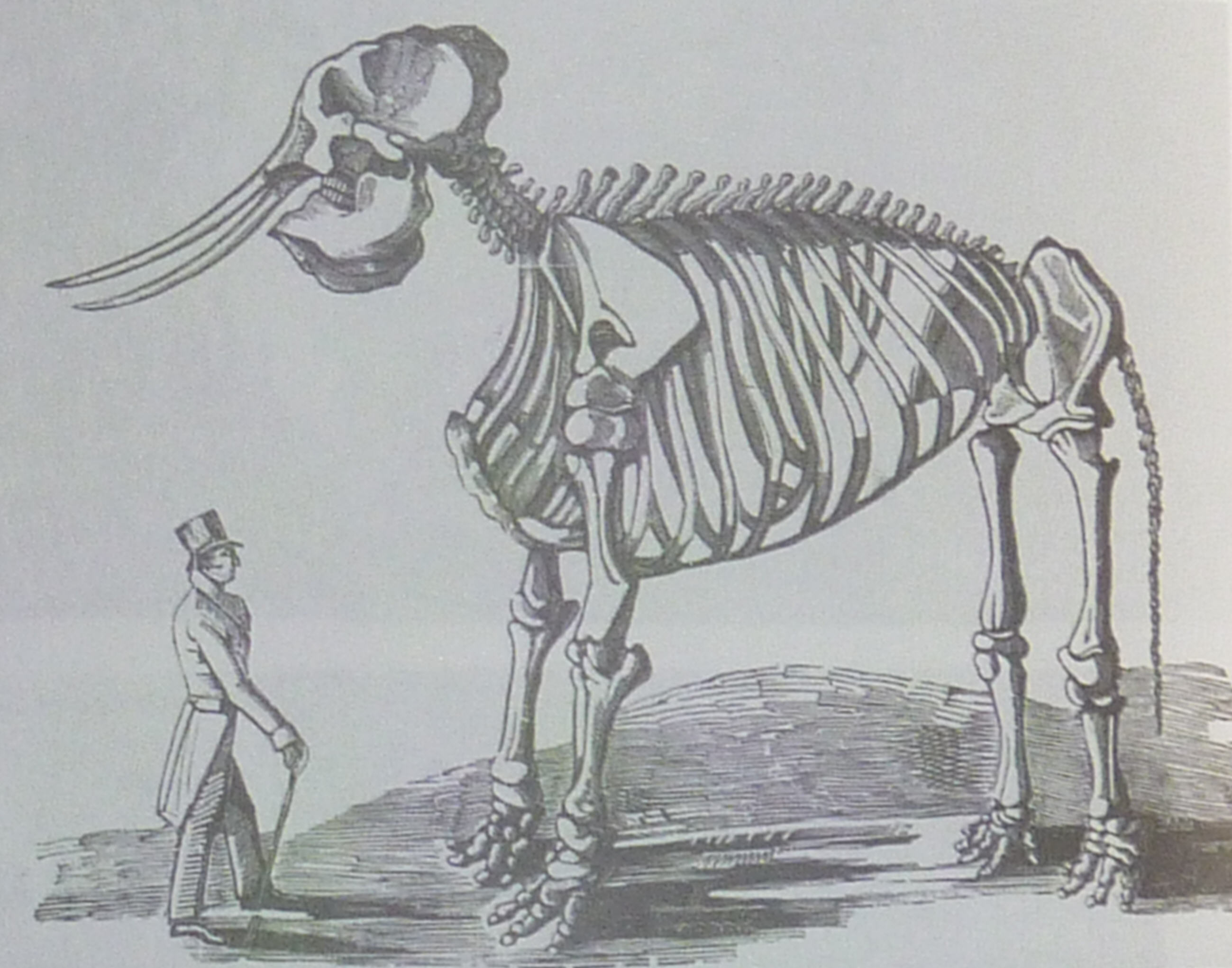
Chunee's skeleton

Chunee (also known as Chuny or Chuneelah; died 1 March 1826) was an Indian elephant in Regency London.

Three elephants were brought to England in East India Company ships between 1809 and 1811. The third of these was Chunee. He travelled on the East Indiaman, Astell, from Bengal, arriving in England in July 1811. Two other elephants, also owned by Stephen Polito at some point, arrived in England. The first arrived in September 1809. The second elephant was brought to England from Sri Lanka on the East India Company ship Walthamstow in June 1810.

Mr Polito ... has obtained possession of a remarkably fine Elephant, brought to England in the Hon. East India Company's ship, Winchelsea, Capt. William Moffat, which will be exhibited at Rumsey [sic] fair on Monday; and it is expected he will be offered for public inspection for a day or two, in this town [Winchester], on his way to the Exeter 'Change London.

— Hampshire Chronicle, 23 April 1810.

Chunee arrived in 1811 (some sources mistakenly state 1810) and was originally exhibited at the Covent Garden Theatre, but was bought by Polito (along with a two-headed cow, kangaroos, beavers, and exotic birds) from the estate of Gilbert Pidcock of the Exeter Exchange after Pidcock's death in 1810. After Polito's death, the menagerie was eventually purchased by Edward Cross in 1814. The events which led to Chunee being put down at Cross's orders 12 years later became a cause célèbre. At the time of Chunee's death, he weighed at least 5 tonnes, stood between 10 and 11 feet tall, and was valued at £1,000. Cross had insured him for £500.

== Career ==
Chunee was described at one point as "between ten and eleven feet in height, and weighs at least, by computation, between four and five tons. This huge mountain of flesh consumes daily three trusses of hay, and about two hundred weight of carrots and other fresh vegetables, together with from sixty to eighty gallons of water".

Tame for most of his life but not as docile as it was sometimes claimed, Chunee was first trained as a theatrical animal, appearing onstage with famed thespian Edmund Kean. Kean "kept up an acquaintance" with the elephant who showed his appreciation for the actor, "whom he would fondle with his trunk" in exchange for loaves of bread. Chunee's appearances included Blue Beard, at the Theatre Royal, Covent Garden, and the pantomime Harlequin and Padmanaba, or the Golden Fish, at the Theatre Royal, Drury Lane. He was retired from the stage owing to "uncertain temper and stage fright" and subsequent poor reviews from audiences and critics during the pantomime role, which would be his last. He was relocated to the Exeter Exchange and learned tricks including being trained to take a sixpence from visitors to the menagerie to hold with his trunk before returning it. He was also trained to ring the bell for the menagerie supper every evening at nine o'clock. He could use his trunk to take a penny from his keeper to buy a cake from an old cake-seller. An entry in Lord Byron's journal records a visit to Exeter Exchange on 14 November 1813, when "The elephant took and gave me my money again—took off my hat—opened a door—trunked a whip—and behaved so well, that I wish he was [sic] my butler."

== Later years and death ==
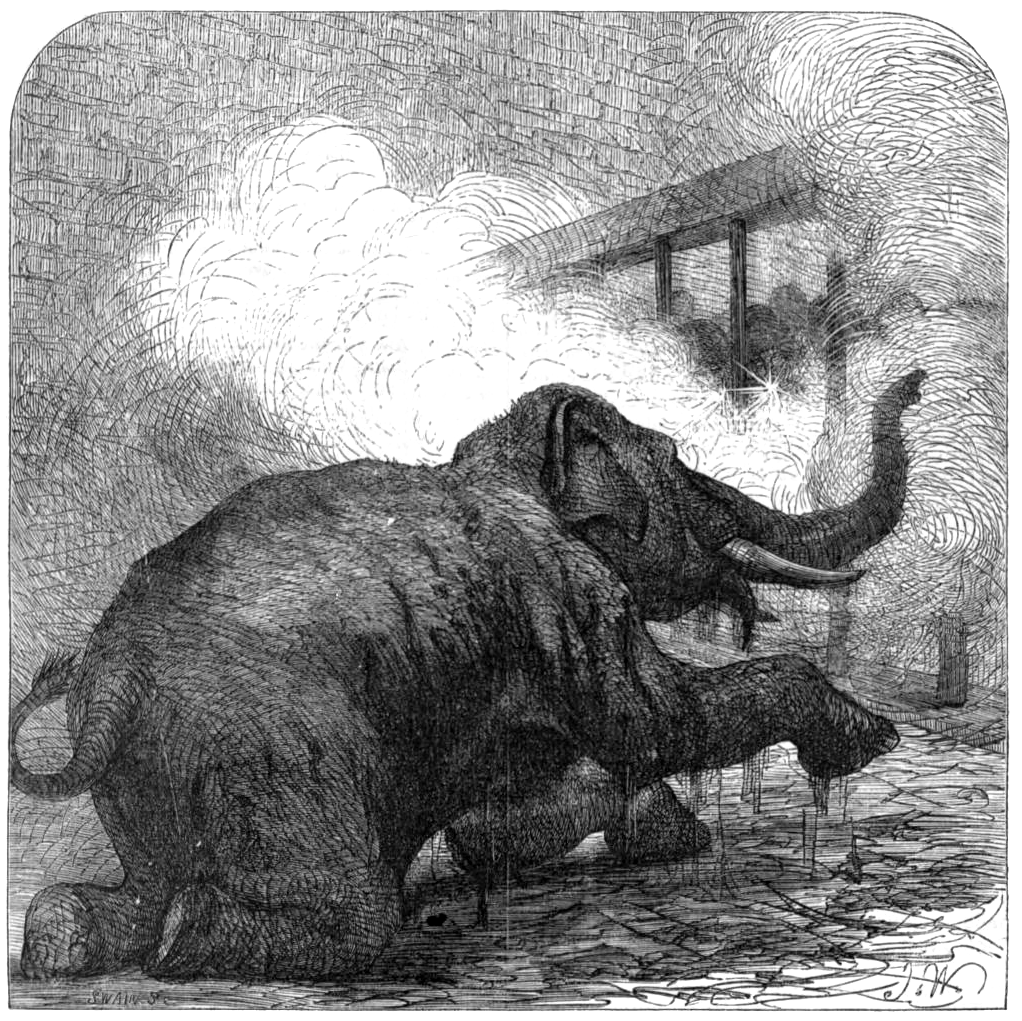
Illustration for magazine article by engraver Joseph Swain depicting the shooting of Chunee

By 1820, Chunee had more than doubled in size since his arrival in England, requiring new quarters—an "upstairs cage, made of iron-bound oak bars, three feet in girth"—which cost Cross £350. Chunee by then was consuming 800 pounds of hay, corn, straw, carrots, mangel wurzel, and biscuit daily. Around that time, Chunee attacked his keeper, Alfred Copps (or Cops), a competent man with whom Chunee had seemed to enjoy a good relationship and who, up to that point, seemed to have had Chunee under control. He had taught Chunee some of his tricks. Chunee forced Copps into a corner of the cage. Copps was not pierced by the elephant's tusks, but fell to the ground unconscious and was worked on by Chunee with his trunk until Edward Cross was able to distract the elephant. Copps was extracted from the cage. The reason for the attack remains unknown. Cross was concerned but ultimately decided to keep Chunee, the menagerie's star attraction. Copps remained with the exchange until 1822 (when he became the last Keeper of the Royal Menagerie at the Tower of London) but never dealt with Chunee again.

Increasingly intractable and sometimes violent during his last four years, this was attributed to an "annual paroxysm" (musth, which afflicts all non-castrated male elephants, whereby bull males, of a certain age and thereafter, are flooded with high levels of testosterone and show heightened aggression and unpredictability), which was treated for years with copious amounts of purgatives, the results and side effects of which were never memorialised. It was considered that if this treatment worked at all it was only because "the peristaltics of the bowels continuously operating at maximum velocity might well have had a fatiguing influence even on an ungovernable elephant".

His frustrated libido and matelessness were aggravated by relatively cramped quarters in which he lived in forcible seclusion as there was no way of conveying him, due to his size and weight, in and out of the exchange building. When he ceased being taken out for Sunday walks is unknown but must have predated his taking up domicile in the larger quarters upstairs in 1820. Added to this, he suffered latterly by a rotten tusk which gave him a bad toothache, which, according to William Ellis-Rees, Chunee brought on himself, when, while assailing the wooden bars of the den cage, a "splinter of ivory set up an inflammation in the pulp of the tusk, and Chuny, maddened by the pain, went berserk."

On 1 November 1825, Chunee accidentally killed one of his keepers, Johann Tietjen, a native of Germany. While being cleaned, he turned too sharply and one of his tusks embedded in the unfortunate Tietjen's ribs. Chunee was fined a deodand of one shilling by a coroner's jury for this. Fearing for his reputation, Cross tried to sell Chunee for £500 to an American showman, then travelling through England. No ship captain would agree, however, to take aboard such a huge creature on the long voyage even if Chunee could have been somehow transported from his quarters.

By February 1826, permanently enraged, the elephant's "eyes now glared like lenses of glass reflecting a red and burning light", according to one account. On 20 February 1826, he acted out. A laxative made "of salts, treacle, calomel (a fungicide), tartar emetic (expectorant), gamboge (purgative), and croton oil (purgative)", with a tub of hot ale to effectuate it, failed to work. Six pounds of beef bone marrow, however, ameliorated only briefly and he was given more.

By 26 February 1826, he was close to destroying the den that had withstood his lunges over the previous four years. There was justified fear that his lunges would bring down the ceiling or cause him to fall to the first floor and escape into the Strand, with resultant human casualties. Carpenters refused to mend the damage out of fear of the enraged pachyderm. It was decided that Chunee was now too dangerous. Three days later (Wednesday, 1 March), his keepers tried in different ways to feed him food which had been laced with poison but Chunee refused each time to eat it. Soldiers were summoned from Somerset House to shoot Chunee with their muskets.

152 musket balls were fired but Chunee kept rising each time he had been thought to be mortally wounded, appearing more frantic each time and on the verge of bringing down the entire exchange building. Muskets which had been aimed at his heart had instead hit his shoulder blade. His keepers called out his old commands to kneel upright and, amazingly, he obeyed. He was finally shot in the gullet (throat) and fell while the firing continued. The gullet shot was reportedly delivered by William Herring, who was Edward Cross's brother-in-law. Spears were then used. Chunee was finally finished off by either a sabre attached to a pole, or, according to at least one source, a poisoned harpoon. Some called him "the elephant who refused to die". It was reported that the "quantity of blood that flowed was very considerable, and flooded the den to a great depth."

== Aftermath ==
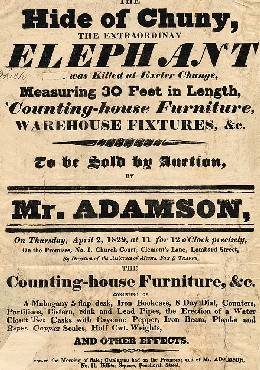

Hundreds of people paid the usual shilling entrance fee to see his carcass butchered, and then dissected by doctors and medical students from the Royal College of Surgeons. His skeleton weighed 876 lb (397 kg), and was sold for £100 and exhibited at the Egyptian Hall in Piccadilly, and later at the Royal College of Surgeons in Lincoln's Inn Fields, the bullet holes clearly visible. His skin weighed 17 cwt (1,900 lb or 860 kg), and was sold to a tanner for £50. Chunee's skeleton, along with a display of the affected tusk, was on display in the Royal College of Surgeons Museum until 11 May 1941 when the museum was almost entirely destroyed by a direct hit from an Axis bombing during WWII. Chunee's skeleton was destroyed.

The manner of Chunee's death was widely publicised, with illustrations printed in popular newssheets of volley after volley being shot into his profusely bleeding body. The Mirror reported that two large steaks from Chunee's rump were broiled and eaten by those dismantling his corpse. Noting that stewed elephant's foot was a delicacy, the magazine provided its readers with a recipe.

Maudlin poems were published such as "Farewell, poor Chuny". Letters were printed in The Times protesting the circumstances of Chunee's death and the alleged poor quality of the living conditions of the animals in the menagerie. The Zoological Society of London was founded the following month (April 1826). The controversy was the inspiration for a successful play at Sadler's Wells, entitled Chuneelah; or, The Death of the Elephant at Exeter 'Change, which ran for around six months.

The menagerie at Exeter Exchange declined in popularity after Chunee's death. The animals were moved to King's Mews in 1828, and the exchange was demolished in 1829.

== See also ==
- List of individual elephants
- Elephant execution in the United States
- Mary (elephant)
- Topsy (elephant)
- Tyke (elephant)
