= HCS Hugh Lindsay =

East India Company ship

History

British India
- Name: Hugh Lindsay
- Namesake: Hugh Primrose Lindsay
- Owner: East India Company
- Operator: East India Company
- Builder: Bombay Dockyard (Note: Under the direction of Captain Sir Charles Wilson, R.N.)
- Cost: Rupees 225,000 (hull)
- Launched: 14 October 1829
- Fate: Wrecked 18 August 1865

General characteristics
- Tons burthen: 411, or 414 (bm)
- Length: 140 ft 4 in (42.8 m)
- Beam: 24 ft 10 in (7.6 m)
- Installed power: 2 × 80HP steam engines built by Henry Maudslay, of Lambeth
- Propulsion: Paddle steamer
- Speed: 6 miles
- Armament: 4 guns

The H[onourable] C[ompany's] S[hip] Hugh Lindsay was a paddle steamer built in Bombay in 1829 for the naval arm of the British East India Company (EIC) and the first steamship to be built in Bombay. She pioneered the mail route between Suez and Bombay. Hugh Lindsay was lost in the Persian Gulf on 18 August 1865.

== Origins ==
Mountstuart Elphinstone, the Governor of Bombay, in 1823 put a proposal before the Court of Directors of the EIC for a mail route between England and Bombay via the Red Sea. The Directors were uninterested. They were still uninterested when he renewed the proposal in 1826. The concept of what would be referred to as the overland route involved steamers from London to Alexandria, via Malta, an overland passage to Suez, and then steamers from Suez to Bombay. Elphinstone's successor, Sir John Malcolm decided to proceed on his own.

When Mrs. Wilson launched Hugh Lindsay, Hugh Lindsay was the first steamship built in Bombay, though not the first built in India. (The first ocean-going steamship launched in India was Diana, launched at Calcutta on 12 July 1823.)

== Career ==
After her launch, on 20 March 1830 Commander John H. Wilson, of the Indian Marine, left Bombay for the Red Sea. He had volunteered for the experimental voyage out of a desire to be the "first steam navigator of the Red Sea." The voyage too Suez took 21 days and eight hours, and the return voyage to Bombay took 19 days and 14 hours. However, to achieve this voyage Hugh Lindsay carried enough coal for the 1641 mile leg between Bombay and Aden, which took 11 days, though she was designed to carry 5½ days' coal. The extra coal came at the expense of passengers and cargo. Furthermore, a sailing collier brig preceded Hugh Lindsay, carrying 500 tonnes of coal to Aden, Jeddah, and Suez. Lastly, in addition to sailing time, the voyage required extra days for stoppages, especially coaling. Labor was difficult to find at Aden so loading there took six days to load 180 tons. The EIC therefore established a coaling station at Maculla instead.

Wilson's next three voyages took place on 5 December 1830, 5 January 1832, and 14 January 1833. In all, Wilson made the voyage seven times. (Note: Wilson left the sea in 1836 to become the Comptroller of the Bombay Dockyard. He retired in 1838.)

On 4 February 1833, the Bombay Government sanctioned a classification of the vessels of the Indian Navy. It classified Hugh Lindsay to be of the third class.

In 1834, after Hugh Lindsay returned from a voyage to Suez, the Bombay Government sent her with dispatches to Bassadore, in the Persian Gulf near Bandar Abbas. From there a sailing ship would carry them to Basra for overland transport to Aleppo. The distance was about 1,000 miles (1,600 km), and once again there were no coaling stations on the way. She left on 24 May and arrived at Bassadore on 31 May, with her coal almost completely exhausted. She made the return voyage to Bombay under sail, and with wood she had procured at Bassadore. The next year Hugh Lindsay supported the English Euphrates expedition and carried mails and dispatches from Basra to Bombay.

Hugh Lindsay made one voyage a year to Suez until 1836. She sailed during the North-east monsoon; she was not strong enough to make the voyage during the South-west monsoon. In 1834, the EIC considered Socotra as a location of a coaling station for the Bombay to Suez run and stationed a garrison there for about a year. However, it proved unsuitable. Instead, the British acquired Aden in 1839 for use as a coaling station.

On 13 April 1837, Hugh Lindsay, HMS Winchester, and HCS Atalanta carried troops and artillery to Mangalore to relieve a siege there by an insurgent army. However, when the vessels arrived, they found that a force from Cannanore had already relieved the siege.

On 17 June 1837, a gale at Bombay damaged Hugh Lindsay and a number of other vessels. Hugh Lindsay parted her moorings and got foul of Berenice, and lost her paddle boxes, cutwater, and figurehead, and suffered other severe damage.

By one account, Hugh Lindsay remained on the Suez run until 1839 or 1840. In 1839 Hugh Lindsay, under the command of Lieutenant C.D.Campbell, embarked the British Government's Resident in the Persian Gulf, Captain Hennell. Hennell and Hugh Lindsay made a tour of the ports of the west coast of the Gulf to encourage the sheikhs to renew the one-year truce on naval activities (including piracy). (Note: In 1843 the annual truce became a ten-year truce, and in 1853 the Perpetual Maritime Truce.) After Hennell left Hugh Lindsay at Bushire, she carried the mails to Bussorah. From there she traveled up the Karoon to Mohamrah, being the first steam war vessel to ascend the river. Campbell laid Hugh Lindsay alongside the Persian governor's fort, with the result that the governor reversed an earlier decision to prohibit the EIC from shipping coal from its depot.

Later, she was transferred to Madras where she reportedly sailed until 1857–8; she then supposedly was broken up. Another account had Hugh Lindsay sold in 1857, also for breaking up. However, Hugh Lindsay continued to sail for another seven or eight years.

In 1855, the Government of India transferred the responsibility for the mail service from the Indian Marine and contracted with P&O Line, which already had the contract for mail service between England and Alexandria.

== Fate ==
Hugh Lindsay was wrecked on 18 August 1865 off Bassadore (26°39′N 55°22′E). All on board survived.
