= Exeter Exchange =

Former building in London

Coordinates: 51°30′40″N 0°07′16″W

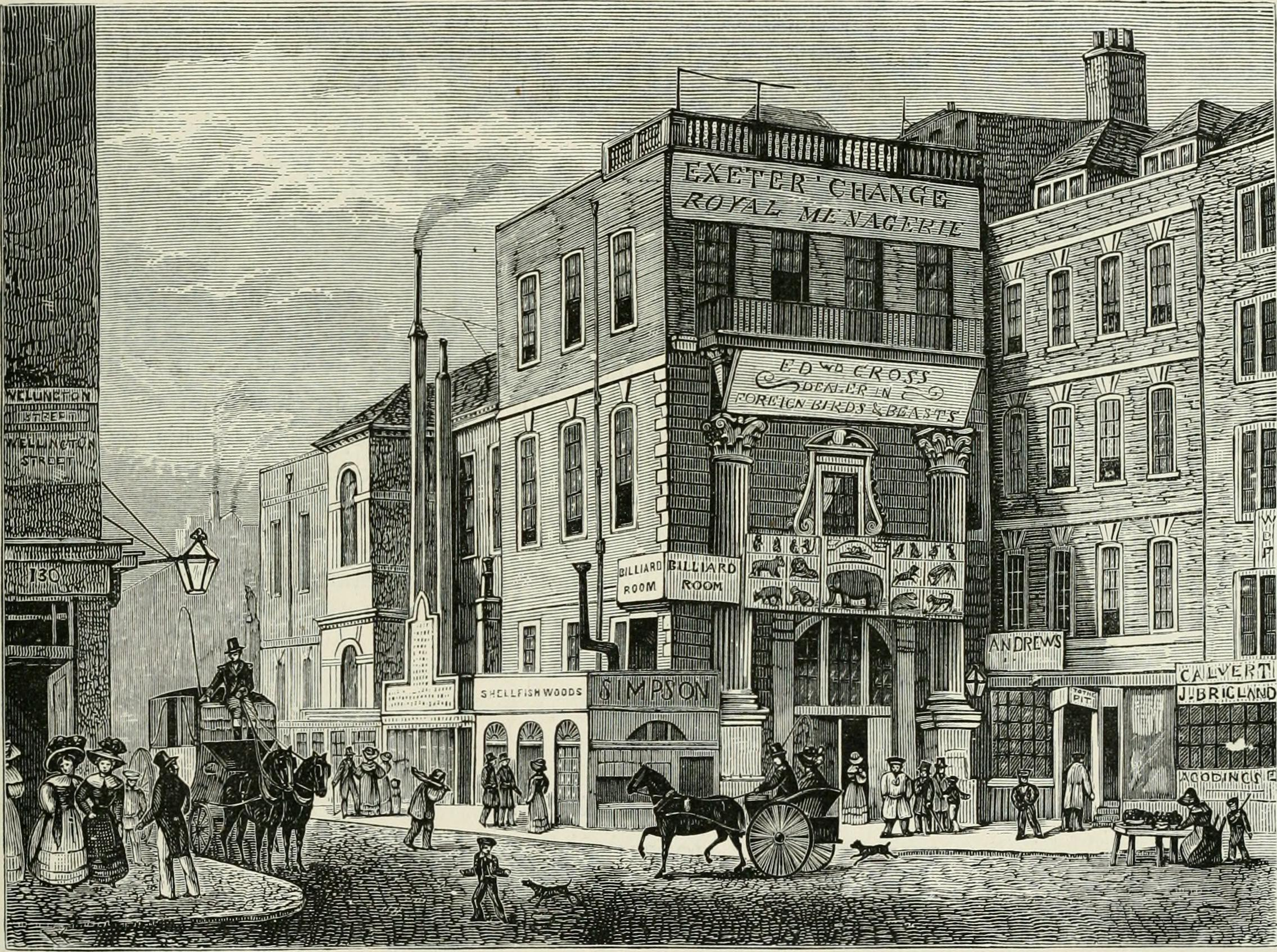
Engraving of Exeter Exchange from 1826, viewed from the east, looking west down the Strand.

The Exeter Exchange (signed and popularly known as Exeter 'Change) was a building on the north side of the Strand in London, with an arcade extending partway across the carriageway. It is most famous for the menagerie that occupied its upper floors for over fifty years, from 1773 until the building was demolished in 1829.

== Its first century ==
Exeter Exchange was built in 1676, on the site of the demolished Exeter House (also known as Burghley House and Cecil House, following the naming conventions of British aristocracy), London residence of the Earls of Exeter. Around the same time, the nearby Burleigh Street and Exeter Street were laid out. The Exeter Exchange originally housed small shops (milliners, drapers, hosiers) on the ground floor, and rooms above which were let to the Land Bank. Over time, the traders on the ground floor were replaced by offices, and the upper rooms were used for storage.

The management began to re-purpose the upper rooms. In April 1770, Giovanni Battista Gervasio, an Italian mandolinist who toured Europe, gave a concert in "the room over the Exeter Exchange." It was the first time it had been used for that purpose.

== The final half-century ==
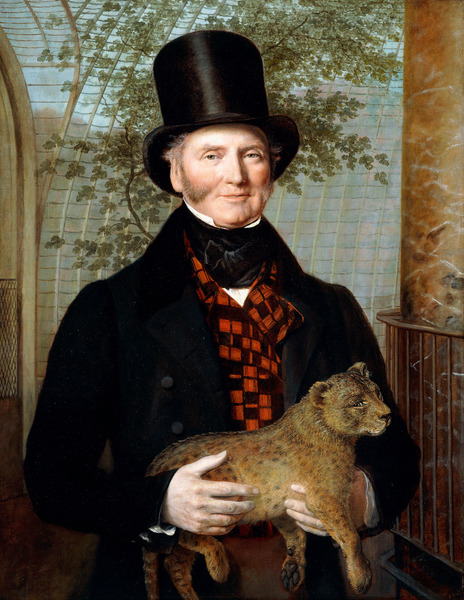
Edward Cross, 1838

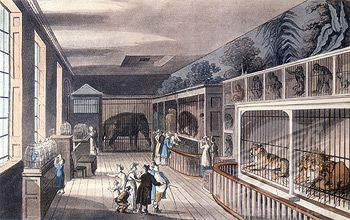
The menagerie at Exeter 'Change, ca 1820

From 1773, the upper rooms were let to a series of impresarios who operated a menagerie in competition with the Royal Menagerie at the Tower of London. The menagerie at the Exeter Exchange at various times included lions, tigers, monkeys, and other exotic species, all confined in iron cages in small rooms. The roaring of the big cats could be heard in the street below, occasionally scaring horses that passed by. The menagerie was established by Thomas Clark and was purchased in 1793 by Gilbert Pidcock. It subsequently passed into the ownership of Stephani Polito. Both Pidcock and Polito were operators of travelling circuses, who used the Exeter Exchange as winter quarters for their animals. The menagerie was a popular visitor attraction, visited by Wordsworth and Lord Byron. Edwin Landseer and Jacques-Laurent Agasse were among the artists who drew and painted the animals.

Polito died in 1814, and the menagerie was acquired by one of his former employees, Edward Cross. Cross renamed the collection the Royal Grand National Menagerie and employed a doorkeeper who was dressed as a Yeoman of the Guard. His elephant, Chunee, which had become violent, possibly due to musth, was shot there in March 1826 by soldiers from Somerset House. When the Exeter Exchange was demolished in 1829, as part of general improvements to the Strand, the animals were dispersed to the new London Zoo in Regent's Park and Cross's new enterprise at Surrey Zoological Gardens.

== Afterwards ==
Exeter Hall was built on the site, opening in 1831 and surviving until 1907. The site is now occupied by the Strand Palace Hotel (opened 1909), almost opposite the Savoy Hotel (1889).
