= Hartmut Lutz =

Polish academic (born 1945)

Hartmut Lutz (born April 26, 1945) is professor emeritus and former chair of American and Canadian studies: Anglophone literatures and cultures of North America at the University of Greifswald, Germany. He is the founder of the Institut für Anglistik und Amerikanistik, a research centre for Canadian and American literature studies at Greifswald. Beginning in the 1980s, he pioneered the field of Indigenous literary studies by establishing intercultural bridges and trans-Atlantic connections with leading Indigenous: authors, scholars, educators, activists and intellectuals from Canada and the United States. He initiated studies on "Indian" stereotyping and coined the term "Indianthusiasm" to describe the fascination Germans have with all things "Indian". Throughout his career, Lutz put in practice the "nothing about us without us" principle set forth by Indigenous people and devoted himself to asking for their thoughts and to collaborating on bringing their words to a wide public in North America and Europe.

== Career ==
Lutz was born in Rendsburg, Germany. Between 1966 and 1969, he earned a general teaching degree (up to 9^{th} grade) and a special teaching diploma in English for high school from the Pädagogische Hochschule Kiel (PHK), a teacher training college, later merged with the University of Kiel. He earned his doctorate in English literature at the University of Tübingen, and subsequently taught English and American literature, as well as North American and minority studies at the University of Osnabrück from 1975 to 1994.

Throughout his career, he has held guest professorships in: Canada, Denmark, Finland, Iceland, Norway, Poland, Romania, Spain and the United States. Namely:

- As an American Council of Learned Societies and Fulbright scholar, in 1979–1980, he taught Native American Studies at the University of California, Davis, while conducting research for his 1983 habilitation at the University of Osnabrück on Indian stereotyping.
- In California, Lutz also taught at Deganawidah-Quetzalcoatl University.
- In 1990–1991, he was a DAAD guest professor at the Saskatchewan Indian Federated College, in Regina, Saskatchewan. The establishment is now known as the First Nations University of Canada.

In 1987, during his first visit to Canada, Lutz learned of the diary kept by Abraham Ulrikab, a Labrador Inuk who died in Paris while he was touring throughout Europe in one of Carl Hagenbeck's ethnographic exhibition (a human zoo). With his students, Lutz translated and contextualized the diary. In 2003, Lutz received the John G. Diefenbaker Award from the Canada Council for the Arts, which brought him to the University of Ottawa's Institute of Canadian Studies for one year. During that period, the University of Ottawa Press showed interest in Lutz's work on Ulrikab's diary. His and his students' work was published in 2005 (The Diary of Abraham Ulrikab: Text and Context). At the time, Lutz had no way of knowing that this publication would be the catalyst to the discovery, in 2011, of Ulrikab's remains in the collection of the National Museum of Natural History, France.

In 1989, Lutz was the founding editor of OBEMA (Osnabrück Bilingual Editions of Minority Authors), which published twice a year bilingual editions of works by authors of colour until 1998. He remained editor until 1994.

On April 1, 1994, he assumed a professorship at the University of Greifswald, where he established the Institut für Anglistik und Amerikanistik, a research centre of Canadian studies with a particular focus on Canadian Aboriginal literature and other minority literature in Canada. His academic interests also included issues of race, class and gender in North America. Lutz facilitated speaker series, guest professorships and annual international Canadian studies conferences for Indigenous and non-Indigenous academics from Canada throughout the years he taught at Greifswald, and especially from 2009 to 2011, when he was president of the Association for Canadian Studies in the German speaking countries ("Gesellschaft für Kanada-Studien (GKS) in den deutschsprachigen Ländern"; GKS) [Austria, Germany, Switzerland].

For the year 2011–2012, he was a professor at the University of Szczecin, Poland.

In 2018, Hartmut Lutz donated over 1,000 books by Canadian Indigenous authors and on Indigenous subjects to the Simon Fraser University.

He continues to promote understanding of Indigenous literature through interviews, translations, lectureships and critical essays.

On November 19, 2021, he was inducted as an international fellow of the Royal Society of Canada.

== Awards ==
Year	Award
2001–2002	Harris German-Dartmouth Distinguished Visiting Professorship
2003	John G. Diefenbaker Award by the Canada Council for the Arts (awards is funded by the Canadian Government)
2012	Izaak Walton Killam Visiting Fellowship at the University of Calgary.
2013	International Council for Canadian Studies' Certificate of Merit awarded during a visiting professorship at the University of Trier's International Research Training Group "Diversity", on June 22, 2013, in recognition of outstanding contributions to the development of Canadian Studies.
2016	Reichwald Visitorship University of British Columbia (Okanagan Campus).
2021	Elected International Fellow of the Royal Society of Canada.

== Publications ==
Selection of books authored and/or edited by Harmut Lutz.

Year	Title	ISBN
1975	Lutz, Hartmut. William Goldings Prosawerk im Lichte der Analytischen Psychologie Carl Gustav Jungs und der Psychoanalyse Sigmund Freuds. Frankfurt am Main: Akademische Verlagsgesellschaft. xiv, 335 pp.	978-3-799702-54-6
1980	Lutz, Hartmut. D-Q University: Native American Self-Determination in Higher Education. Davis, Ca.: Department of Applied Behavioral Sciences, UC Davis. vi. 142 pp.	
1985	Lutz, Hartmut. "Indianer" und "Native Americans": Zur sozial- und literarhistorischen Vermittlung eines Stereotyps. Hildesheim: Olms Verlag. xii, 538 pp.	978-3-487075-30-3
1987	Lutz, Hartmut. Achte Deines Bruders Traum. Gespräche mit nordamerikanischen Indianern 1978-1985 Osnabrück: Druck- und Verlagsccoperative. 2^{nd} and revised edition 1999. xvi, 226 pp.	978-3-923881-20-8
1990	Karrer, Wolfgang and Hartmut Lutz. Minority Literatures in North America: Contemporary Perspectives. Frankfurt am Main: Peter Lang. 205 pp.	978-3-631422-51-9
1991	Lutz, Hartmut. Contemporary Challenges: Conversations With Canadian Native Authors. Saskatoon: Fifth House Publishers. 276 pp.	978-0-920079-75-1
2002	Lutz, Hartmut. Approaches: Essays in Native North American Studies and Literatures. Beiträge zur Kanadistik, Vol. 11. Augsburg : Wissner Verlag. 282 pp.	978-3-896393-40-1
2003	Lutz, Hartmut and Coomi S. Vevaina. Connections: Non-Native Responses to Native Canadian Literature. Creative New Literature. New Delhi. 305 pp.	978-8-180430-06-0
2005	Lutz, Hartmut, Murray Hamilton, and Donna Heimbecker. Howard Adams: Otapawy! The Life of a Métis Leader in His Own Words and in Those of His Contemporaries. Saskatoon : The Gabriel Dumont Institute Press. xii, 310 pp., & CD-ROM.	978-0-920915-74-4
2005	Lutz, Hartmut (editor and head translator), Hans Blohm and Alootook Ipellie. The Diary of Abraham Ulrikab: Text and Context. Ottawa: University of Ottawa Press. xxvii & 100 pp. Translations by Hartmut Lutz and students from the University of Greifswald, Germany.	978-0-776606-02-6
2007	Lutz, Hartmut, Kathrin Grollmuß, Hans Blohm and Alootook Ipellie. Abraham Ulrikab im Zoo: Tagebuch eines Inuk 1880/81. Wesel (Germany): von der Linden Verlag. 167 p. German translation of The Diary of Abraham Ulrikab : Text and Context.	978-3-926308-10-8
2007	Lutz, Hartmut and Rafico Ruiz. What is Your Place? Indigeneity and Immigration in Canada. Beiträge zur Kanadistik, Bd. 14. Augsburg: Wissner Verlag. 192 pp.	978-3-896395-88-7
2009	Ertler, Klaus-Dieter and Hartmut Lutz. "Canada in Grainau: A Multidisciplinary Survey of Canadian Studies After 30 Years" [Le Canada à Grainau : Tour d'horizon multidisciplinaire d'études canadiennes, 30 ans après]. Collection: Canadiana - Volume 7. Frankfurt am Main et al.: Peter Lang.	978-3-631589-42-7
2009	Lutz, Hartmut and students from the Greisfwald University. Heute sind wir hier/We are Here Today: A Bilingual Collection of Contemporary Aboriginal Literature(s) from Canada. Wesel : von der Linden Verlag. 215 pp.	978-3-926308-12-2
2014	Jacobsen, Johan Adrian. Voyage with the Labrador Eskimos, 1880-1881. Gatineau (Quebec): Polar Horizons. 86 pp. (English translation by Hartmut Lutz of Johan Adrian Jacobsen's 1880-1881 diary when he recruited Abraham Ulrikab)	978-0-9936740-5-1 (paperback) 978-0-9936740-1-3 (pdf) - Out of print.
2014	Suchacka, Weronika, Uwe Zagratzki and Hartmut Lutz. Despite Harper: International Perceptions of Canadian Literature and Culture. Hamburg: Verlag Dr. Kovac, 167 pp.	978-3-830074-12-0
2015	Lutz, Hartmut. Contemporary Achievements: Contextualizing Canadian Aboriginal Literatures. Studies in Anglophone Literatures and Cultures. vol. 6, ed. Martin Kuester. Augsburg: Wissner Verlag, 334 pp.	978-3-957860-09-5
2019	Jacobsen, Johan Adrian. Voyage with the Labrador Eskimos, 1880-1881. Second enlarged edition. Gatineau (Quebec): Polar Horizons. 300 p. (English translation of Johan Adrian Jacobsen's diary by Hartmut Lutz and Dieter Riedel)	978-1-7750815-3-1 (softcover) 978-1-7750815-4-8 (epub)
2020	Lutz, Hartmut, Florentine Strzelczyk and Renae Watchman. Indianthusiasm: Indigenous Responses. Waterloo: Wilfrid Laurier University Press, 262 pp.	978-1771123990
