= Hans Blohm =

German photographer (1927–2021)

Hans-Ludwig Blohm
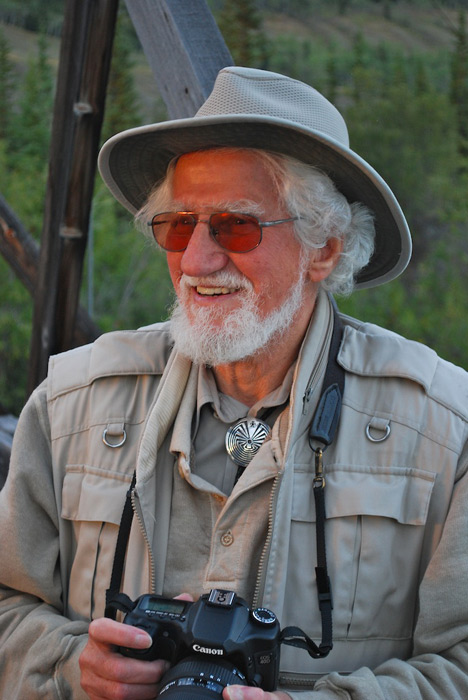
- Photo taken on the footbridge across the Pelly River, near Ross River, Yukon, along the Canol Road in 2009
- Born: November 12, 1927; Rendsburg, Schleswig-Holstein, Prussia, Germany
- Died: December 4, 2021 (aged 94); Ottawa, Ontario, Canada
- Citizenship: Canadian, German

Hans-Ludwig Blohm CM (November 12, 1927 – December 4, 2021) was a German-born Canadian photographer and author. Over three decades, he criss-crossed the Arctic regions of Canada and Alaska, capturing images and stories of the Inuit. He drove 16 times from his home in Ottawa to different parts of the North logging from 20,500 to 25,000 km each trip. He also drove the Mackenzie Ice Road to Tuktoyaktuk on the Beaufort Sea at three occasions and explored by sailboat the remote, uninhabited fjords of Labrador.

Blohm's landscapes and portraits have appeared in many books and magazines, while twenty-three of his photographs have appeared on Canadian postage stamps. His solo photo exhibitions travelled across four continents while his 17 books, ranging from coffee-table pictorials to a collection of essays from Northerners, have sold worldwide.

Blohm also left his mark in the world of architecture, portrait and microchip photography. He died on December 4, 2021, at the age of 94.

== The early years ==
From 1943 to 1944, Blohm served with the Navy of Nazi Germany as an anti-aircraft gunner (marinehelfer) in Kiel, Germany’s major naval base on the Baltic Sea. In 1945, he was assigned to the special guard unit for Grand Admiral Karl Dönitz, wartime Germany's last head of state. After being discharged, Blohm helped to rebuild Germany.

His father, an accomplished amateur photographer, sparked his passion for photography early in childhood. In 1949, Blohm purchased his first camera, a Diax with a 50mm lens. Camera in hand, he travelled Europe recording his experiences on film. His most memorable adventure came in 1952 when he and a friend hitchhiked across Lapland for three months. There, he was "bitten by the Arctic bug".

In 1956, Blohm went to Canada hoping to bring back to Germany a childhood friend, Ingeborg Ramm, who had emigrated to Canada a year earlier. After travelling across Canada, the couple realized they wanted to stay. Blohm and Ingeborg were married on November 2, 1956. They settled in Ottawa to raise their three children: Norman, Heike and Sigrid.

Blohm became a Master Carpenter in 1955. From 1956 to 1958, he worked as a carpenter. Then he secured a job as a school photographer for all the rural schools in the Western Quebec School Board and in Eastern Ontario. For two years, with his Volkswagen Beetle, he travelled the back roads from Montreal to Port Hope visiting the one-room schools.

From 1958 to 1963, Blohm became a darkroom technician and manager. But when he dared ask for a raise he was instantly fired. With his portfolio in hand, he went around Ottawa knocking on doors. He was close to getting discouraged when the National Film Board of Canada (Stills Division) offered him $600 for a selection of his transparencies for featured publication in Year of the Land and Call them Canadians, two pictorial books about Canada.

Later in 1963, Blohm found a job at Photo Features Ltd doing contract work for the Ottawa Citizen and operating the very first wire service in Canada (which had been set up for one of their clients, the Toronto Star). By 1966, he had become a partner in the business, owning 50% of the shares.

From 1964 to 1966, the Canadian Broadcasting Corporation hired Blohm as a freelance cameraman. He participated in numerous National Film Board books, publications and audiovisual programs.

In 1966, Blohm decided to become a freelance photographer. For Expo 67 in Montreal, he was involved in the advanced planning of photo exhibits.

In 1969, he formed Foto Blohm which became Foto Blohm Associates Ltd. in 1971.

In the years that followed his skills and reputation as a photographer grew. Blohm's recognition earned him numerous major photo assignments from architects, high technology sector, government departments, galleries, etc.

Blohm's first exposure to the Arctic came about in 1977 when he and daughter Heike drove from Ottawa to the Yukon and Alaska on a personal assignment. He wanted to photograph the installation of a new bridge over the Eagle River, some 15 km from the Arctic Circle. This bridge is the northernmost steel bridge of its kind, with special high tensile strength steel to withstand the temperature differences of the North. That steel was produced by Stelco of Hamilton, Ontario, one of Blohm's clients. The Canadian Army Corps of engineers set up the bridge across the Eagle River on the unfinished Dempster Highway in winter 1976-77. In winter 1978-79, Blohm headed north again up the Dempster Highway.

== Summary of achievements ==
Blohm's first assignment in the Canadian North occurred in Pond Inlet in 1979 when he was given the opportunity to photograph a gathering of Elders coming from all corners of Baffin Island.

Blohm was hired to record all the big events leading up to the establishment of Nunavut. He was present at several of the meetings where the negotiations took place; the Agreement in Principle in Igloolik; the contract signing with Prime Minister Brian Mulroney in Iqaluit; the Royal Assent signing at Coppermine (Kugluktuk); the unveiling of the Nunavut flag in Iqaluit during the April 1, 1999 celebration marking the official creation of the Nunavut Territory.

Blohm also obtained assignments from Makivik Corporation, Nunavut Tunngavik Incorporated (NTI) and Canadian Geographic to photograph various people of the Arctic. On behalf of the Inuit Justice Taskforce he photographed the Inuit inmates in southern-style penal/halfway institutions in the Arctic as well as white man's court in session about the Inuit.

Blohm's book based on his experiences with northern people, The Voice of the Natives - The Canadian North and Alaska, took three decades and was originally published in English and German. During his travels, Blohm asked the northern Native people to reflect upon their experience on the living land. It has texts by a variety of Inuit. Blohm published it into the language of the Inuit. An advanced copy of the Inuktitut version was unveiled at the Frankfurt International Book Fair on October 7, 2004.

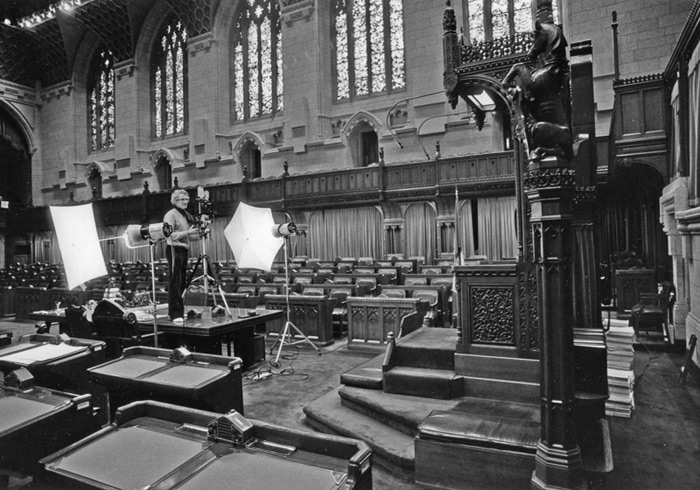
HLB on the speaker's table in the Canadian House of Commons.

Blohm's work in the House of Commons of Canada has found him at various times perched on top of the Speaker's table or constructing a special "tent" to control lighting around the highly polished Speaker's mace.

Throughout his career, he had the opportunity to take the official portraits of several members of the House of Commons of Canada.

Blohm was assigned by the National Film Board to photograph the burial of Prime Minister Lester B. Pearson as well as the Liberal Party of Canada convention where Pierre-Elliott Trudeau won the leadership and replaced Lester B. Pearson.

Blohm supported his camera with a solid gold bar while working deep within the main vault of the Royal Bank of Canada.

Blohm undertook (along with other photographers) the first-ever production of a photographic catalogue of all artworks in the custody of the National Gallery of Canada on the occasion of its 100th anniversary (in 1980).

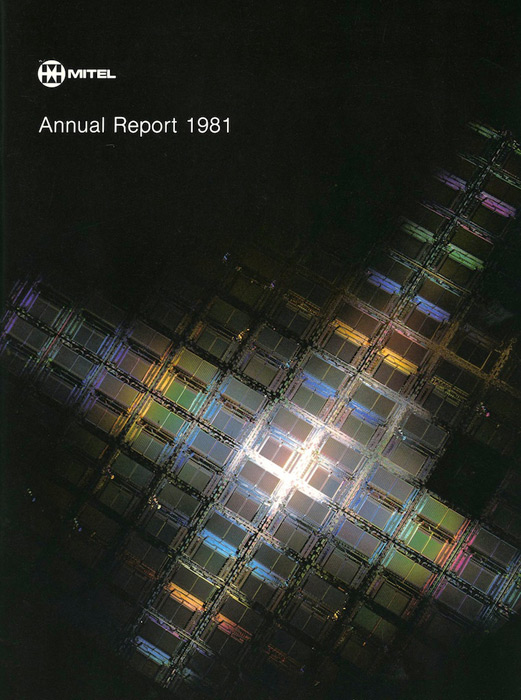
HLB's photo appearing on the cover of Mitel's 1981 Annual report.

An altogether different aspect of Blohm's work has focussed on high technology. In 1981, as he was standing in Mitel’s lobby with one of the company’s 3-inch wafers in his hands, light hit the wafer a certain way and he saw a riot of colour coming off. After hours of attempts, the right angle appeared and Blohm took the photo he had longed for. The next day, the photo was put on the cover of Mitel’s annual report. Mitel commissioned their first backlit mural (six panel 14’ long and 10’ high) in a two-story-high mirrored wall used to create a panoramic array at its main reception lobby. For this mural, the 1/25th of a ¼" square microchip had to be enlarged 16 million times in area. Engineers calculated it to be the highest magnification of a small portion of a microchip, up to that time. Blohm was commissioned to produce nine more murals that hung in Ireland, Puerto Rico, Washington, D.C., Florida, Bromont, Quebec, etc. One of these was 28’ long and 8’ high for the new Mitel plant in Renfrew, Ontario. Before long, he was hailed by some as Canada's best microchip photographer.

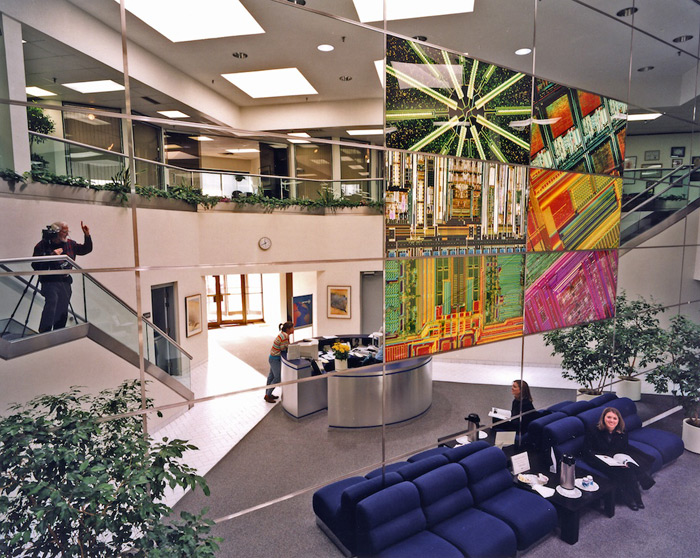
Blohm with the two story high installation of the mural in the Mitel lobby.

Images of integrated circuits captured on his research microscope have become the public image of several high technology clients such as Mitel, Nortel, MOSAID, Motorola, Optotech, Lumonics, etc.

In 1986, Blohm published Pebbles to Computers with Anthony Stafford Beer (Oxford University Press). The book traces the evolution of technology from early pebble to computers through information storage devices such as the Phaistos Disc in Crete, Stonehenge, and medieval calculators. It is a visual and philosophical musing on the link between prehistoric and ancient technologies and the "so-called high technology" of today. Blohm invested over six years of research and travel (to thirteen countries) before the book was published. As well as the book, an international exhibit, a calendar and a one-hour TVOntario documentary were produced.

Blohm's photographs are distributed worldwide by Masterfile, Canada's largest stock photography agency. Blohm has been a contributor for over 30 years.

For Science North in Sudbury, Ontario Blohm photographed thin slices of various rocks containing minerals in polarized light and darkfield. His photographs are being shown to children and visitors as part of the interpretive display.

Over 180,000 photographs taken by Blohm have been acquired by Library and Archives Canada.

== Publications ==
| Year | Title | ISBN |
|---|---|---|
| 1982 | Monk, Lorraine, Gail Vanstone and Hans Blohm. Canada with love = Canada avec amour. Toronto: McClelland and Stewart. | 0771060823 |
| 1983 | Blohm, Hans and Paul Russell. The Beauty of Ontario. Toronto: Methuen Publishing. | 0458961205 |
| 1983 | Blohm, Hans and Paul Russell. The Beauty of British Columbia. Toronto: Methuen Publishing | 0458961108 |
| 1984 | Blohm, Hans and Paul Russell. The Beauty of Quebec. Toronto: Methuen Publishing | 045896820X |
| 1984 | Blohm, Hans and Paul Russell. The Beauty of the Maritimes. Toronto: Methuen Publishing | 0458968307 |
| 1984 | Blohm, Hans and Claus-M Naske. Alaska. Toronto: Skyline Press | 0195406044 |
| 1986 | Haas, Rudi and Hans Blohm. Egg-carton Zoo; with an introduction by David Suzuki. Toronto: Oxford University Press Canada. | 0195405137 |
| 1986 | Suzuki, David T., Hans Blohm and Marjorie Harris. Sciencescape - The Nature of Canada. Toronto: Oxford University Press Canada. | 0195405285 |
| 1986 | Blohm, Hans, Anthony Stafford Beer and David Suzuki. Pebbles to Computers: The Thread. Toronto: Oxford University Press Canada. | 0195405366 |
| 1989 | Blohm, Hans, Heike Blohm and Rudi Haas. Egg-carton Zoo II. Don Mills: Oxford University Press Canada. | 0195407180 |
| 1992 | Monk, Lorraine, Hans Blohm et al. Canada with love = Canada avec amour. Willowdale: Firefly Books. | 1895565278 |
| 2001 | Blohm, Hans. The Voice of the Natives - The Canadian North and Alaska. Manotick: Penumbra Press. | 978-1-894131-13-1 |
| 2002 | Blohm, Hans. Die Stimme der Ureinwohner: der kanadische Norden und Alaska. Wesel [Germany]: M. u. H. von der Linden, [2002]. German translation of The Voice of the Natives. | 3926308079 |
| 2005 | Lutz, Hartmut, Alootook Ipellie and Hans Blohm. The Diary of Abraham Ulrikab. Ottawa: University of Ottawa Press | 978-0-7766-0602-6 |
| 2007 | Lutz, Hartmut, Kathrin Grollmuß, Alootook Ipellie and Hans Blohm. Abraham Ulrikab im Zoo: Tagebuch eines Inuk 1880/81. Wesel (Germany): vdL:Verlag. German translation of The Diary of Abraham Ulrikab. | 978-3-9263-0810-8 |
| 2008 | Blohm, Hans. Nunaqaqqaaqsimajunut nipigijaujuq Kanatami ukiuqtaqtuani Alaska-milu. Ottawa: Foto Blohm Associates. Inuktitut translation of The Voice of the Natives. | 097363670X |
| 2010 | Raach, Karl-Heinz, Hans Blohm and Karl Teuschl. Kanada. Germany: Stürtz, 2010 | 978-3-8003-1896-4 |

== Canadian postage stamps ==
| Date of issue | Value | Description |
|---|---|---|
| 1980-03-06 | $0.17 | Photograph of Louis-Phillippe Hebert's sculpture named "Inspiration". This stamp is part of the "Academy of Arts" series issued to celebrate the centenary of the Royal Canadian Academy of Arts. |
| 1980-09-03 | $0.35 | Uraninite molecular structure |
| 1982 | $0.30, $0.35, $0.60 | Blohm photographed five of Canada's oldest stamps for this series commemorating "Canada 82", the International Youth Exhibition. |
| 1987-06-12 | | Blohm photographed various tools used by philatelists. His pictures appear on the souvenir sheet commemorating the centennial of organized philately in Canada. |
| 1990-12-28 | $0.40 | One of Blohm's photograph of a mountain range was used as the background to the stamp "Flag over mountains". |
| 1991-12-27 | $0.42 | One of Blohm's photograph of a mountain range was used as the background to the stamp "Flag over mountains". |
| 1992-09-21 | $0.42 | Canadian Minerals. Series of five stamps issued for the 150th anniversary of the Geological Survey of Canada. All five photographs were taken by Blohm. |
| 1994-03-08 | $0.43 | Four of Blohm's photographs were used to make the drawings that appear in the joining tabs for the block of four stamps. These drawings represent the four roles that Jeanne Sauvé played. |
| 2002-06-01 | $1.25 | Tourist Attractions collection. Blohm's photograph of Northern Lights was used on the Northwest Territories’ stamp. |
| 2003-06-12 | $0.65 | Tourist Attractions collection. Blohm's photograph of Wilberforce Falls was used for Nunavut's stamp |
| 2003-09-08 | $0.48 | Four stamps were issued to commemorate Canadian authors. Blohm's photographs of the original handwriting of these authors were used. |

== Major solo photo exhibits ==
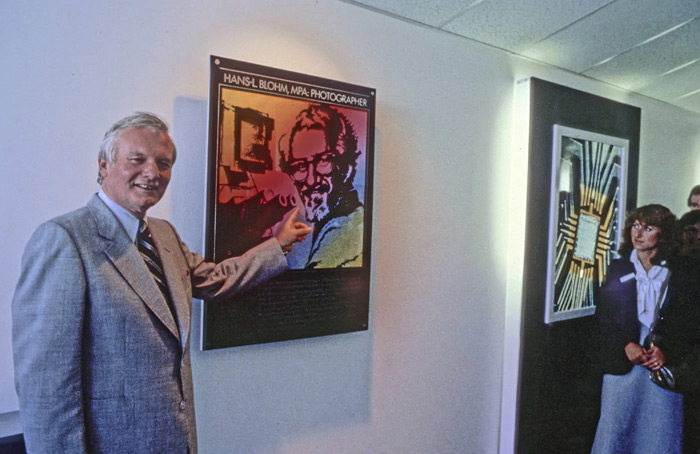
Abstracted portrait of Hans Blohm on a large poster pointed at by Bill Davis, the then premier of Ontario. During the opening of Blohm's first high tech solo exhibition at Toronto's Future Pod in the Toronto Harbour.

| Title | Description |
|---|---|
| From Bona Vista to Vancouver Island | In 1979, the exhibit was presented at the Goethe Institute in Ottawa (March 6 to March 25), at the First Canadian Place in Toronto (April 5 to 26) and at Place Bonaventure in Montreal (May 1 to June 1). From 1983 to 1990, it travelled to Great Britain, France, Ireland, Germany, and Austria. |
| Serendipity. Art Forms in High Technology, Nature and the Cities | From 1984 to 1991, three copies of the exhibit were travelling at the same time on four continents, e.g. Tokyo, Santiago, Lima, Bogotá, Sydney, Perth, Wellington, Caracas, etc. |
| From Pebbles to Computers, a philosophical, historical, and partly technological overview of information technology from Antiquity to today. | From 1985 to 1991, four copies were travelling at the same time on four continents. The exhibit was seen in Ottawa, Dallas, Los Angeles, San Francisco, Seattle, Minneapolis, Chicago, Detroit, Cleveland, Buffalo, Boston, Atlanta, Bonn, Berlin, Paris, Dublin, Brussels, The Hague, Belgrade, Islamabad, Karachi, Bombay, Delhi, Bangkok, Singapore, Manila, Jakarta, Tokyo, Beijing, Moscow, Riga, San José, Mexico City, Havana, Caracas, Santiago, Bogotá, and Lima. Many larger US cities requested the exhibition two or even three times. |

== Honours and awards ==
- The city of Ottawa has named Blohm Drive and two housing complexes (Blohm Court #1 and Blohm Court #2) in Blohm's honour. The street and the complexes are located in Hunt Club Park, east of Conroy Rd. At the time of their construction, it was decided that these developments and their streets would be given the name of prominent Ottawa photographers. Blohm Drive connects with Karsh Drive, named for portrait photographer Yousuf Karsh. The official opening of Blohm Court and Karsh Court occurred on June 17, 1988. These complexes are managed by the Ottawa Community Housing Corporation.
- In 2005, First Air chose one of Blohm's photographs of an inuksuk for the 11 meter high tailfin of the airline's passenger jet fleet.
- Professional Photographers Of Canada (PPOC) awarded him the title of Craftsman of Photographic Arts in 1972 and Master of Photographic Arts in 1974.
- Countless number of awards from professional photographic associations and photo clubs. Several regional awards for his architectural photographs.
- In December 2011, he was made a Member of the Order of Canada for his commitment to preserving Canada's northern heritage through the lens of his camera.
- In May 2012, he was awarded the Diamond Jubilee Medal

== What has been said about Hans Blohm and his work ==
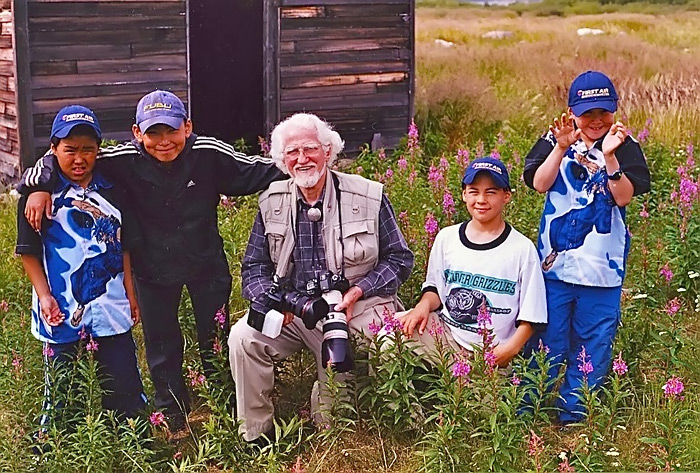
Hans Blohm with Inuit children during the Inuit Circumpolar conference in 2002 in Kuujjuaq (Nunavik)

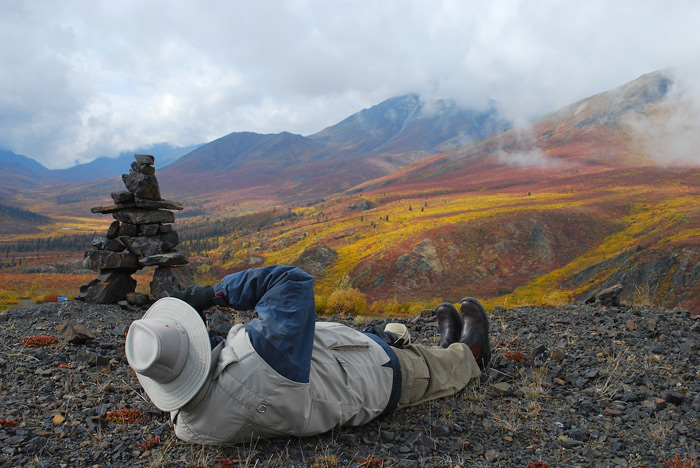
Hans Blohm in the Tombstone Valley, Dempster Highway, Yukon (August 2009).

- The Voices of the Natives... The Canadian North and Alaska by Hans Blohm is a true representation of the Northern People. While working with Nunavut Tunngavik Inc, an Inuit Land Claims Organization [...] Hans has recorded the history of Inuit in Nunavut. Hans has traveled extensively throughout the Arctic regions of Canada and Alaska. He has documented the hopes and visions of our Elders. He documented the youth of Nunavut, drumming for joy, promoting the happiness and joys of our people. Through his camera lens, Hans has helped to protect, preserve and promote Inuit culture. That is good for all people – Northerners and Southerners alike. [...] Hans is a true "Ambassador". He is our voice in southern Canada and the world. He has also become a good friend of us Northerners – we trust him. Peter Irniq, Commissioner of Nunavut, August 1, 2001
- When I looked at Hans’ photos, there was much more of an artistry to it than I would ever have imagined. Taking something that looks so mundane and figuring out how to make it art is very unique and that’s where Hans excels. Jacques Guerette of Zarlink Semiconductors.

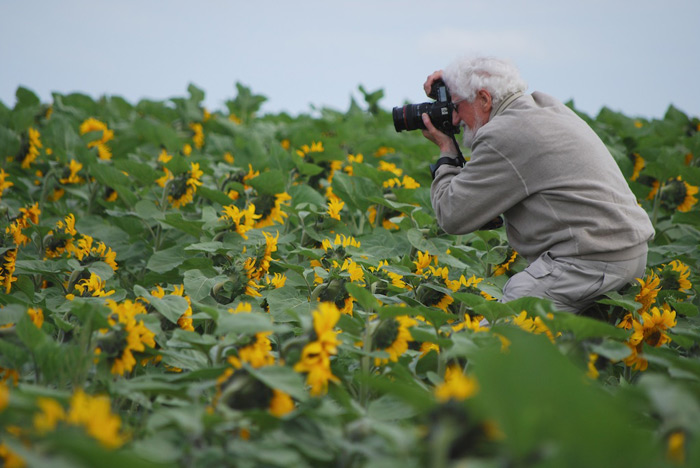
Hans Blohm in a field of sunflowers, Manitoba, August 2009.

- He’s so skilled in that he’s able to convert the mundane to something exciting. It’s the sow’s ear to silk purse analogy. Steve Wilson, manager of design engineering services at Optotech
- He is superb for taking a very complicated environment as it is, and directing traffic within it. A lot of people don’t know how versatile he really is. He’s done everything from walkabout shoots to photo microscopy and straight tabletop for us. Don Hewson, president of Hewson-Bridge and Smith Ltd, Ottawa
- It is not with every photographer you can talk about the history of mathematics and computers with. He has a superb understanding of these things, technical excellence, yet is also able to aesthetically tie it all together. Frank Edwards, associate publisher of Camden House Publishing
