= Gustaf Retzius =

Swedish histologist (1842–1919)

Gustaf Retzius FRSFor HFRSE MSA
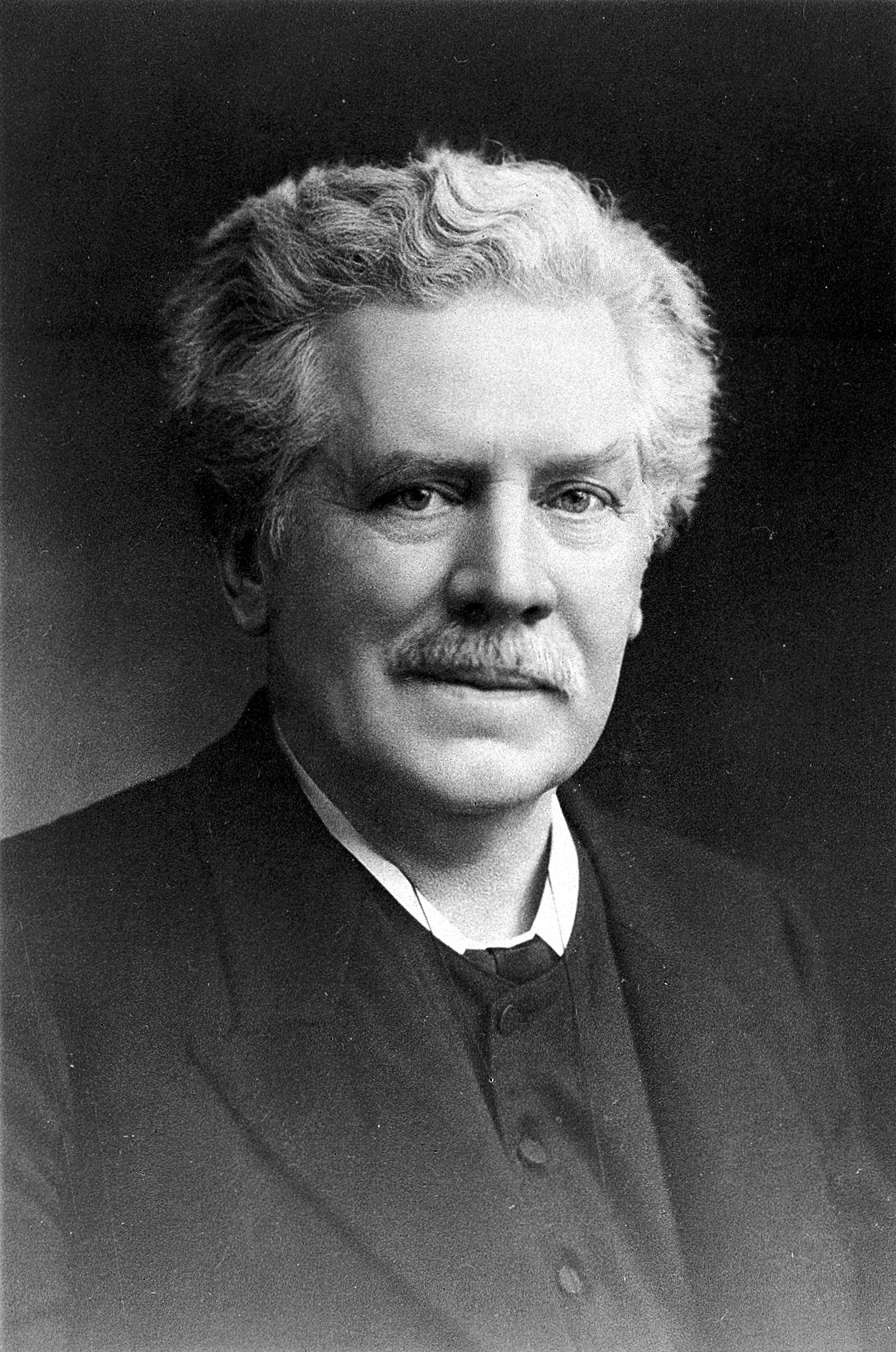
- Portrait by Elliott & Fry, 1908
- Born: 17 October 1842; Stockholm
- Died: 21 July 1919 (aged 76); Stockholm
- Education: Uppsala University; Lund University
- Known for: Cajal–Retzius cell Nervous system Area postrema
- Scientific career
- Fields: histology, neurology
- Doctoral students: Emil Holmgren
- Author abbrev. (botany): G.Retz.

Magnus Gustaf Retzius (17 October 1842 – 21 July 1919) was a Swedish physician and anatomist who dedicated a large part of his life to researching the histology of the sense organs and nervous system.

== Life ==
Retzius was born in Stockholm, son of the anatomist Anders Retzius (and grandson of the naturalist and chemist Anders Jahan Retzius). He enrolled at Uppsala University in 1860, and received his medicine kandidat degree there in 1866, transferred to the Karolinska Institute, where he received a Licentiate of Medical Science (Medicine licentiatexamen) degree in 1869 and completed his doctorate in medicine (PhD) in 1871 at Lund University. Retzius worked as an assistant under pathologist Axel Key; the two had a long partnership, publishing research together and the popular science Ur vår tids forskning.

He received an extraordinary professorship in histology at the Karolinska Institute in 1877 and an ordinary professorship in anatomy there in 1889 (acting from 1888), but resigned in 1890 after conflicts with other members of the institute. As he was married to the feminist Anna Hierta, daughter of the founder of the newspaper Aftonbladet Lars Johan Hierta, his personal wealth allowed him to pursue his research and writing without any stable employment. Moreover, Retzius served as the editor of the newspaper Aftonbladet (1884–1887) and was also a journalist there.

== Journeys to Egypt and North America ==
Retzius traveled outside of Europe twice, both times together with his wife Anna. During these trips he was keen to buy ethnographic and archaeological collections for a planned ethnographic museum in Stockholm.

=== Egypt 1889–1890 ===
In the winter of 1889–1890, they visited Egypt. Retzius published articles from the trip in Aftonbladet, which later came to be published as a book Skizzer och uppsatser: Bilder från Nilens land (Sketches and essays: Pictures from the Nile country). For two weeks departing from Cairo on Christmas Day, they traveled on the Nile. They first traveled up the river to the city of Aswan. There Retzius purchased collections in the bazaars. Soon the sellers realized that Retzius was a customer who could pay and they came to the boat and offered their goods and items directly from the beach. Retzius was looking for skulls for his anthropological studies and managed to acquire 30 "mummies" during an excursion from Aswan to some rock graves across the Nile where a "caretaker" on site sold the skulls to Retzius. Through some English officers he also managed to acquire six skulls from the Battle of Toski. On the way back down the Nile, they visited both Karnak and Luxor. In Luxor, he managed to buy a total of 125 skulls with the help of consul Ahmed Effendi Moustapha Ayyâd who sent out a person to dig up graves and bring the skulls. Once back in Cairo, Retzius had the opportunity to meet the famous Henry Morton Stanley, who just performed his failed expedition to liberate Emin Pascha. In Cairo, Retzius made further purchases of collections. Large parts of Retzius's collections are available at Medelhavsmuseet in Stockholm and at the Museum of Ethnography in Stockholm.

=== North America 1893 ===
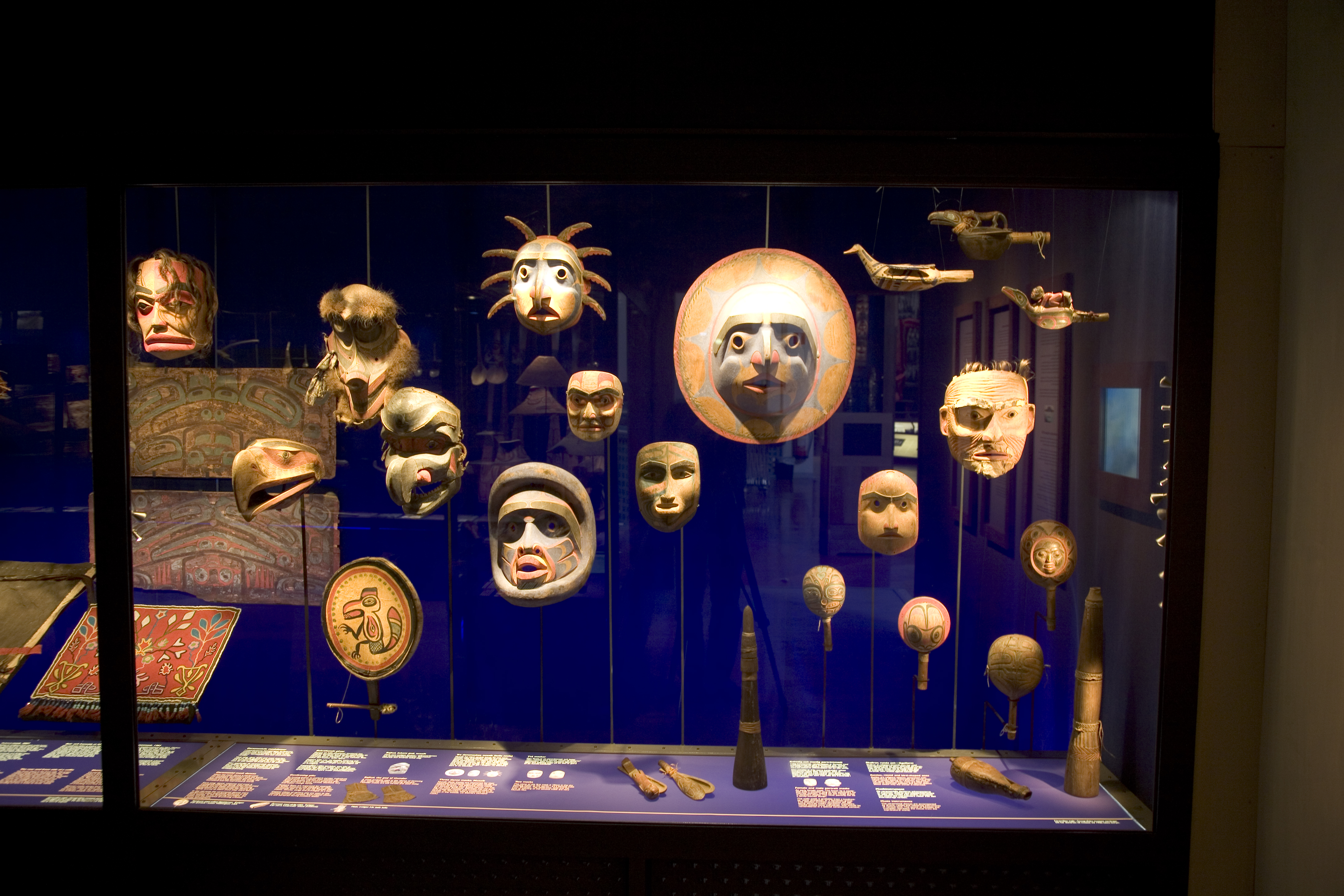
Objects from British Columbia at the Museum of Ethnography, Stockholm, collected by Gustaf Retzius 1893

During six months beginning in June 1893, the Retzius couple traveled in North America. Just as during the trip to Egypt, an important goal was to buy collections for the future ethnographic museum, as well as to visit colleagues and their institutions. Also during this trip, Retzius reported in articles in Aftonbladet under the heading "Pictures from North America". However, there was never a book. The first visit was to Yale and the paleontologist Othniel Charles Marsh who was followed by several other university visits. They visited the World's exhibition in Chicago where they, among other things, saw ethnographic exhibitions and also several different indigenous people who performed and danced. Here they met the Danish Adrian Jacobsen and the famous Franz Boas. After the world exhibition, they visited several different places and cities, including Santa Fe. They get this opportunity to visit an "Indian settlement" outside the city. In Santa Fe there was an antique shop called Jake Gold's Free Museum (Gold's Old Curiosity Shop) where Retzius bought ethnography. For a few weeks, they visited the northwest coast and British Columbia. They came to the city of Victoria, where there were several traders for ethnography, and then traveled on the Vancouver Island. In Bella Bella, they met Adrian Jacobsen's brother Filip Jacobsen who made it possible for Anna and Gustaf to visit several different places during a 12-day trip and also to purchase ethnographic collections. A large part of the objects in the stores in Victoria had been collected by the Jacobsen brothers. Gustaf and Anna were dismayed at the methods used by the dealers to trick the indigenous people to relinquish older items that were not for sale. They were also critical of the missionaries in the area. Gustaf did not get as many skulls during this trip in comparison to the Egyptian journey, but he managed to acquire four so-called "longhead" skulls. The trip home to Sweden went via stops in several cities, including Chicago again, Baltimore and Washington. Large parts of the collections Retzius acquired during his journey can be found at the Ethnographic Museum.

== Research ==
Retzius published more than 300 scientific works in anatomy, embryology, eugenics, craniometry, zoology and botany. He gave his name to the 60 micrometer-diameter Retzius cells in the central nervous system of the leech (Hirudo medicinalis).

During his time at the Karolinska Institute, he made important contributions to anatomical descriptions of the muscles of the eardrum, the bones of the middle ear, and the Eustachian tube.

His 1896 2-volume work Das Menschenhirn (The Human Brain) was perhaps the most important treatise written on the gross anatomy of the human brain during the 19th century.

He also studied ancient Swedish and Finnish skulls, following the steps of his father Anders Retzius, who had studied the crania of different human "races" and made pseudoscientific contributions to phrenology. Retzius was one of the fathers of the pseudoscientific race theory, "scientific racism", trying to glorify the "Nordic race" as the highest race of mankind. Skulls taken by Retzius from cemeteries in Finland have been repatriated, and are to be reinterred as close as possible to original burial sites.

== Swedish Academy ==
Retzius was politically and socially active. Together with his wife he founded the Hierta-Retzius foundation, which is now administered by the Royal Swedish Academy of Sciences, which Retzius was a member of from 1879. The foundation has two funds, one for the promotion of biological research and the other for supporting projects of an important scientific or social nature.

In 1901 Retzius became a member of the Swedish Academy, following Adolf Erik Nordenskiöld's demise. He was also a member of the Royal Swedish Academy of Sciences. As a result, he took part in the awarding of the Nobel Prizes in Physics, Chemistry and Literature for years. However, his resignation from his chair in anatomy in 1890 meant that he could not participate directly in the choice of the Physiology or Medicine awardee; although he was an active nominator for that prize from 1901 to 1906, always including Santiago Ramón y Cajal. In addition, he could not send nominations for the other prizes.

During the decision process of the 1906 Nobel Prize in Physiology or Medicine, Retzius ardently stood up for a sole awarding to Santiago Ramón y Cajal, thus excluding Camillo Golgi. This was the same view held by Emil Holmgren in his report for the Nobel Committee. On the contrary, the evaluation by Carl Sundberg favoured Golgi over Cajal. Before the final decision, the written opinion of Bror Gadelius, who shared Holmgren's views was also taken into account. In the end, Cajal and Golgi were jointly awarded, being the first time this Prize was shared between two laureates.

Retzius himself was also a Nobel Prize nominee himself 23 times, in 11 different years from 1901 to 1916. Curiously, he was nominated by Cajal before 1906 and by Golgi after that year.

== Death ==
He died in 1919 in Stockholm. He was survived by his wife. His seat at the Swedish Academy was taken by Adolf Noreen that same year.

== Notes ==
Cultural offices
Preceded by Adolf Erik Nordenskiöld	Swedish Academy, Seat No 12; 1901-1919	Succeeded by Adolf Noreen
