= Abraham Ulrikab =

Inuk from Hebron, Labrador

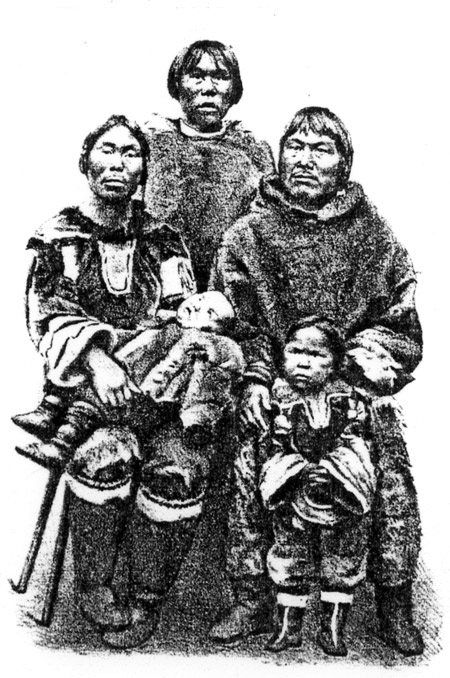
The Ulrikab family: Ulrike, Tobias, Abraham, Maria (on Ulrike's lap) and Sara (standing).

Abraham Ulrikab (January 29, 1845 – January 13, 1881) was an Inuk from Hebron, Labrador, in the present-day province of Newfoundland and Labrador, Canada, who – along with his family and four other Inuit – agreed to become the latest attraction in the ethnographical shows organized by Carl Hagenbeck, owner of the Tierpark Hagenbeck, a zoo in Hamburg, Germany.

== Name origin ==
Before 1893, the Inuit of northern Labrador did not use patrilineal surnames. Instead, the surnames of married couples would usually be their spouse's given name followed by the suffix "-b" or "-ib", if the name did not end with a vowel. It is possible that Ulrikab's surname was actually "Ulrikeb", as "Ulrike" was his wife's name. His wife's full name was therefore likely "Ulrike Abrahamib". Children used the surname of the parent of the opposite gender before marriage, so their children were likely named "Sara Ulrikeb" and "Maria Ulrikeb".

== The Inuit are exhibited in Europe (September 1880–January 1881) ==
The eight Inuit were from two families. Their approximate ages upon arrival in Europe were as follows:

- The Christian family
  - Abraham, 35,
  - Ulrike, 24, his wife
  - Sara, 3 1/2, daughter
  - Maria, infant daughter, 10 months
  - Tobias, 20, a young unmarried man.
- The non-Christian family
  - Tigianniak, about 45, father
  - Paingu, as old as 50, wife
  - Nuggasak, their teenage daughter about 15.

Abraham was literate, an accomplished violin player and a devout Christian. He became the natural leader of the eight and, despite the Moravian missionaries's opposition, Abraham agreed to go to Europe. The money he was to earn would enable him to repay his, and his late father's, debt to the Moravian mission store in Hebron. He was also curious about visiting Europe and was looking forward to seeing some of the Moravian missionaries he had befriended in Labrador. But soon after their arrival in Europe, the Inuit realized they had made a mistake in coming and they longed to return to Labrador.

On August 26, 1880, all eight Inuit boarded the schooner Eisbär (which means "polar bear" in German) and headed to Europe. They arrived in Hamburg on September 24, 1880. Their show at the Tierpark Hagenbeck opened on October 2, 1880. On October 15, the group was moved to Berlin, where they were exhibited at the Berlin zoo until November 14. They then traveled to Prague followed by Frankfurt and Darmstadt. Here, Nuggasak died suddenly on December 14. The group moved on to Crefeld, where Paingu died on December 27. It wasn't until little Sara showed symptoms that the doctors were finally able to diagnose the sickness that was affecting the Inuit: smallpox. It was with a broken heart that Abraham and Ulrike had to entrust Sara to the hospital in Krefeld, as the group had to depart for their next destination, Paris. Sara died on December 31, 1880, as her parents arrived in Paris.

The five survivors were vaccinated against smallpox on January 1, 1881, but it was too late. The group was exhibited at the Jardin d'Acclimation in the Bois de Boulogne for about a week. Then, on January 9, 1881, they were admitted to Hôpital Saint-Louis, where they all died within the next week. Maria died on January 10, 1881. Tigianniak on January 11. Tobias and Abraham died on January 13, and Ulrike, the last to live, died January 16, 1881.

Norwegian Johan Adrian Jacobsen, who had recruited them on behalf of Carl Hagenbeck, had omitted to have them vaccinated against smallpox, even though it was required by German law. In his diary, Jacobsen admitted that he had forgotten about it.

== Abraham's diary ==
During his travels in Europe, Abraham kept a diary written in his native Inuktitut; it was among his possessions that were sent back to his relatives in Hebron after his death.

In Hebron, Moravian missionary Carl Gottlieb Kretschmer, who had tried to dissuade the Inuit from going to Europe, translated Abraham's diary to German. English and French translations were also published in the 19th century Moravian Church publications. Then, the story fell into oblivion for a century.

In 1980, Abraham's diary resurfaced when Canadian ethnologist Dr. James Garth Taylor discovered a copy of Kretschmer's German translation in the archives of the Moravian Church located in Bethlehem, Pennsylvania. Through the article Dr. Taylor published in 1981 in Canadian Geographic, the story of the eight Labrador Inuit was unveiled to the 20th century public.

Over the next 25 years, a few individuals looked into this tragedy, including German ethnologist Hilke Thode-Arora and Professor Hartmut Lutz assisted by his students at the University of Greifswald, Germany. They contextualized Abraham's diary with data gathered from the Moravian archives, from 19th century newspapers as well as from the archives of Carl Hagenbeck and Johan Adrian Jacobsen.

In 2005, the University of Ottawa Press published the work of Hartmut Lutz, and of his students, under the title The Diary of Abraham Ulrikab: Text and Context. At last, Abraham's diary was in book form ensuring that his words and story would find their way to today's Labrador Inuit.

Abraham's diary is significant because it is the only extant account of one of Carl Hagenbeck's European ethnological exhibition (human zoo) by one of the ethnic participants. It is also one of the first autobiographies by an Inuk; Greenlander Hans Hendrik having preceded him by 2 years. Unfortunately, Abraham's original diary in Inuktitut has yet to be located.

== The discovery of the Inuit's remains ==
In 2009, a French-Canadian, France Rivet, was introduced to Abraham's story by master photographer Hans Blohm. Her reading of the book The Diary of Abraham Ulrikab: Text and Context left her wondering what had happened to the Inuit in Paris, and what had become of their remains. She promised Blohm and a Labrador Inuk friend that she would investigate. About a year into her research, she uncovered documents about anthropologists in Paris having studied Paingu's skullcap, as well as plaster casts of the brains of Abraham, Ulrike, and Tobias. Wondering if these items could still be in a museum's collection, she sent a few letters to inquire. Soon a reply arrived from the Muséum national d'Histoire naturelle:

Madame Rivet we regret to inform you that we do not have the brain casts, but we do have the skullcap as well as the fully-mounted skeletons of the five Labrador Inuit who died in Paris in January 1881.

This totally unexpected news triggered a four-year research to fully document the Inuit's story as well as discussions with authorities in Nunatsiavut, Canada, and France in order to prepare the remains' eventual coming home.

== The repatriation of the Inuit's remains ==
In fall 2014, the publication of the book In the Footsteps of Abraham Ulrikab revealed the results of this investigation and publicly released the news that the Inuit's remains had been located. The skeletons of Abraham, of his wife Ulrike, of their daughter Maria, of young Tobias and of Tigianniak were located in the biological anthropology collections of the Muséum national d'Histoire naturelle managed by the Musée de l'Homme in Paris. The skullcap of Paingu, which had been taken by Jacobsen during her autopsy in Krefeld, is also part of the Muséum's collection. Lastly, the skull of Sara was located in Berlin.

The Muséum's Collections Director, Michel Guiraud, has confirmed that they stand at the ready to return the remains to the Labrador Inuit. On June 14, 2013, through the signature of the Canada-France Enhanced Cooperation Agenda, the Canadian and French governments have confirmed they will assist by working with the appropriate authorities to help to repatriate Inuit bones from French museum collections to Canada.

The authorities and the people of Nunatsiavut have started their reflection as to whether or not the remains should be brought back to Canada. In summer 2015, the Nunatsiavut Government has launched a series of public consultations on the development of its policy on the repatriation of human remains and burial objects from archeological sites in Nunatsiavut.

== Film about Abraham Ulrikab ==
A documentary film, Trapped in a Human Zoo: Based on Abraham's Diary, juxtaposing Abraham's story, with the search for his remains, and the Labrador Inuit's quest to bring the remains home aired in February 2016 on CBC Television's The Nature of Things. This documentary is produced by Pix3 Films. In 2017, the documentary received two nominations at the 5th Canadian Screen Awards: Best Science or Nature Documentary Program or Series and the Barbara Sears Award for Best Editorial Research.

== Books published on Abraham Ulrikab ==
| Year | Title | ISBN |
|---|---|---|
| 2005 | Blohm, Hans, Alootook Ipellie and Hartmut Lutz. The Diary of Abraham Ulrikab: Text and Context. Ottawa: University of Ottawa Press | 978-0776606026 |
| 2007 | Lutz, Hartmut, Kathrin Grollmuß, Hans Blohm and Alootook Ipellie. Abraham Ulrikab im Zoo: Tagebuch eines Inuk 1880/81. Wesee (Germany): vdL:Verlag. German translation of The Diary of Abraham Ulrikab. | 978-3926308108 |
| 2014 | Jacobsen, Johan Adrian. Voyage with the Labrador Eskimos, 1880–1881. Gatineau (Quebec): Polar Horizons. (English translation by Lutz, Hartmut of Johan Adrian Jacobsen's diary) | 978-0993674051 (softcover), 978-0993674013 (pdf) – Out of print. |
| 2014 | Rivet, France. In the Footsteps of Abraham Ulrikab: The events of 1880–1881. Gatineau (Quebec): Polar Horizons. | 978-0993674068 (softcover), 978-0993674082 (epub), 978-0993674037 (pdf) [also available in French] |
| 2019 | Jacobsen, Johan Adrian. Voyage with the Labrador Eskimos, 1880–1881. Second enlarged edition. Gatineau (Quebec): Polar Horizons. (English translation of Johan Adrian Jacobsen's diary by Lutz, Hartmut and Riedel, Dieter) | 978-1775081531 (softcover), 978-1775081548 (epub) |

== See also ==
- List of people of Newfoundland and Labrador
