= Ennutsiak =

Inuk sculptor (1896-1967)

- Born: 1896
- Died: 1967 (aged 70–71)

Ennutsiak (also known as Innutsiak or Eenutsia) (1896 – 1967) was an Inuk sculptor. Living on Baffin Island, he depicted scenes of daily life in the Arctic. His work is held by several museums, including the Art Gallery of Toronto and the National Gallery of Canada.

== Early life ==
Originally from Nunavik, he spent most of his life traveling around Baffin Island and eventually settled in Iqaluit.

== Career ==
His work mostly depicts scenes of daily life in the Arctic, such as women giving birth and men butchering seals and walruses. He worked in soapstone, also known as steatite.

His disc number (assigned by the Canadian government) is E7603.

== Later life and legacy ==
Ennutsiak was the grandfather of writer Alootook Ipellie.

His work is held in the permanent collections of several museums, including the Art Gallery of Ontario, the National Gallery of Canada, the Winnipeg Art Gallery, the Montreal Museum of Fine Arts, the Canadian Museum of History, the Berwick Museum and Art Gallery, the University of Michigan Museum of Art, the McMaster Museum of Art, the Collection of the University of Saskatchewan, the Prince of Wales Northern Heritage Centre, and the Museum of Fine Arts, Boston.
