= Marie Davids =

German painter

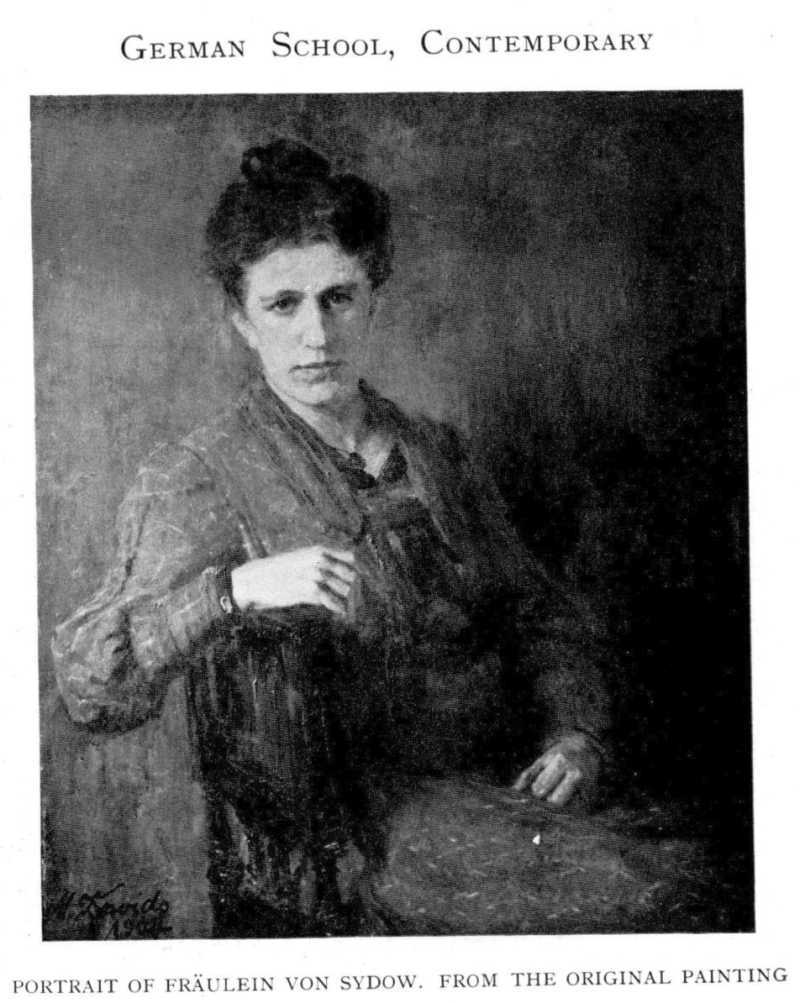
- Portrait of Fräulein von Sydow
- Born: 5 March 1847; Rendsburg, Duchy of Holstein
- Died: 1905 (aged 57–58); Berlin, Germany

Marie Davids (1847–1905) was a German painter.

== Life ==
Davids was born in Rendsburg and became a pupil of Alexander Struys. She was active in Berlin and created mainly portraits. In 1896 and 1904 she exhibited at the International Exhibition. Only in 1889 she was mentioned in the Berliner Addressbuch (Berlin directory) in Bülowstraße 21. 1897 she moved to Nollenorfstraße 10. Her last studio was in Berlin-Tiergarten, Lützowstraße 82. Her work Portrait of Fräulein von Sydow was included in the book Women Painters of the World. Marie Davids stayed unmarried.

== See also ==
- List of German women artists
