= Rendsburg =

- Town
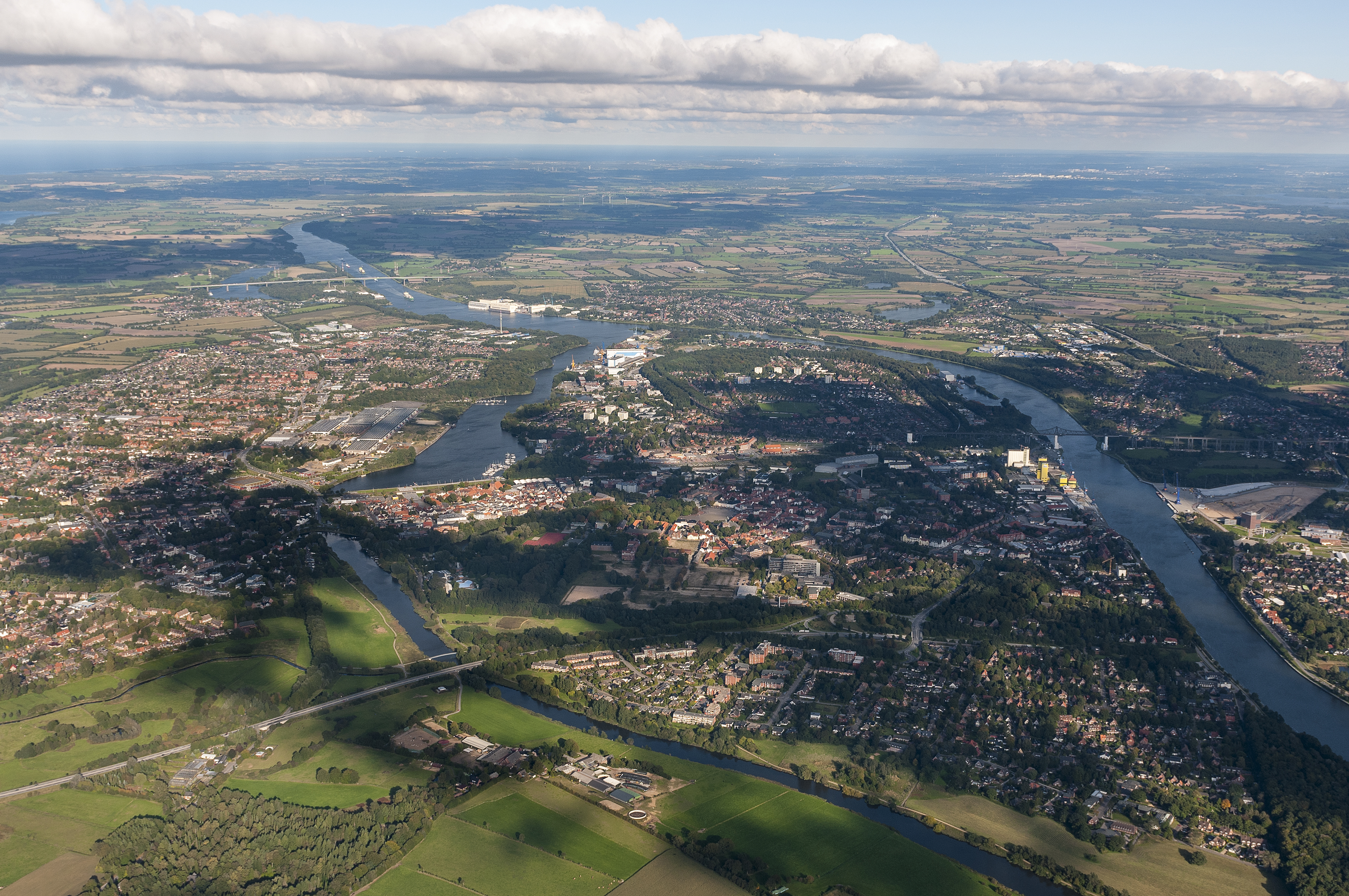
- Aerial view of the town

- Coat of arms

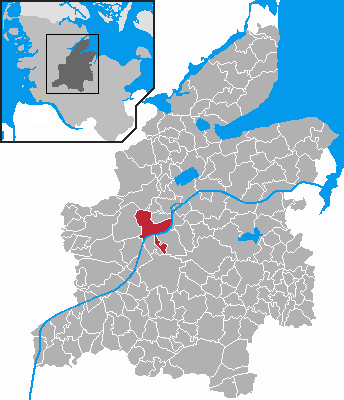
- Location of Rendsburg within Rendsburg-Eckernförde district
- Interactive map of Rendsburg
- Location within Germany Location within Schleswig-Holstein
- Coordinates: 54°18′N 9°40′E
- Country: Germany
- State: Schleswig-Holstein
- District: Rendsburg-Eckernförde

Government
  - Mayor: Janet Sönnichsen (Ind.)

Area
  - Total: 23.75 km^{2} (9.17 sq mi)
- Elevation: 6 m (20 ft)

Population (2025-12-31)
  - Total: 30,305
  - Density: 1,276/km^{2} (3,305/sq mi)
- Time zone: UTC+01:00 (CET)
  - Summer (DST): UTC+02:00 (CEST)
- Postal codes: 24768
- Dialling codes: 04331
- Vehicle registration: RD
- Website: www.rendsburg.de

Rendsburg (German pronunciation: [ˈʁɛntsbʊʁk]; Danish: Rendsborg, also Rensborg, Low German: Rendsborg, also Rensborg) is a town on the River Eider and the Kiel Canal in the central part of Schleswig-Holstein, Germany. It is the capital of the Kreis (district) of Rendsburg-Eckernförde. As of 2006, it had a population of 28,476

== History ==
Rendsburg's foundation date is unknown though some form of fortifications was established by Bjørn Svendsen 1099–1100. Rendsburg was first mentioned in 1199. An old form of its name was Reinoldesburch.

It became a part of Holstein in the 13th century, but was transferred to Schleswig in 1460. Many times the town passed from Danish to German control and vice versa. In the German-Danish War in 1864 Rendsburg was finally seized by the Kingdom of Prussia and the Austrian Empire, and after 1866, the town was annexed by Prussia. Since that time it has remained part of Germany.

Although the Eider is navigable for small craft from its mouth on the North Sea to Rendsburg, the town's importance rose in 1895, when the Kiel Canal was finished. The much larger ships that could navigate the Kiel Canal meant that, although situated inland, Rendsburg became a seaport and a dockyard.

== Sights ==
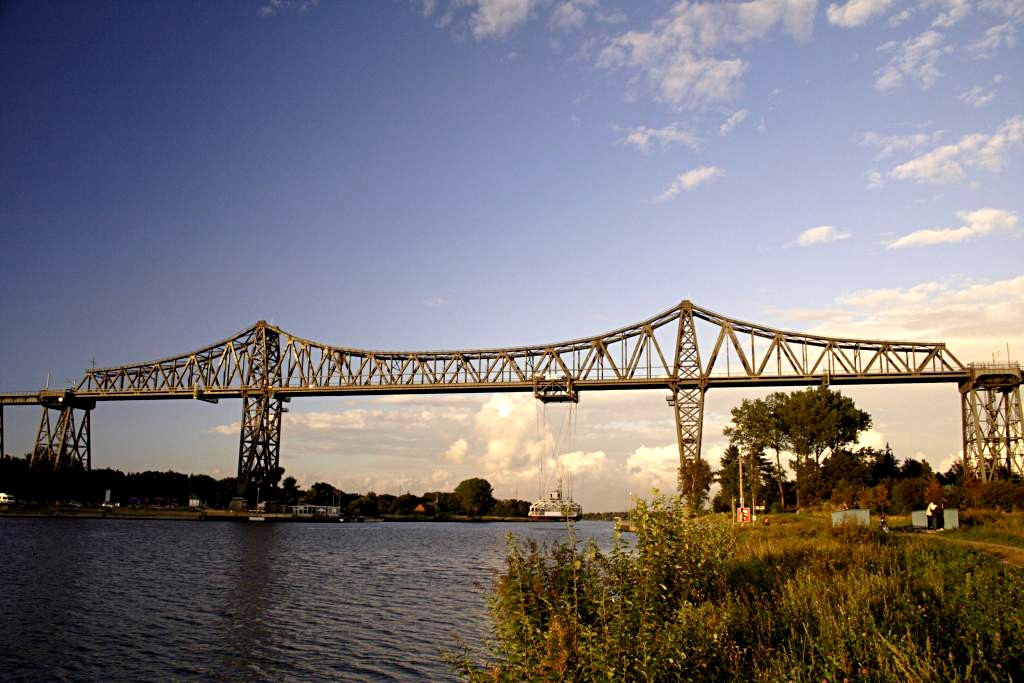
Rendsburg Railway bridge

The most prominent structure in town, the Rendsburg High Bridge, a railway bridge made of steel, 2,500 metres (8,200 ft) in length and 41 metres (135 ft) in height, was constructed in 1913 to take the Neumünster–Flensburg railway over the Kiel Canal from the relatively flat land on either side. It is the longest railway bridge in Europe (highway/rail bridge Øresund Bridge is longer): on the northern side, the bridge connects to the Rendsburg Loop to gain height and to allow trains to continue to serve the Rendsburg station. Suspended from the railway bridge, a transporter bridge – one of only twenty ever built – traverses the canal.

The German Army's Air Defence School and the Bundesamt für Strahlenschutz are both located in Rendsburg.

Other sights include:

- Town hall, 16th century
- Marienkirche (St. Mary's Church), 1286
- Kiel Canal Pedestrian Tunnel, longest pedestrian tunnel in the world
- The longest bench in the world (501 m), on the banks of the Kiel Canal
- Jewish Museum Rendsburg
- Museums in the Cultural Centre (Historical Museum Rendsburg / Printing Museum)

== Notable people ==
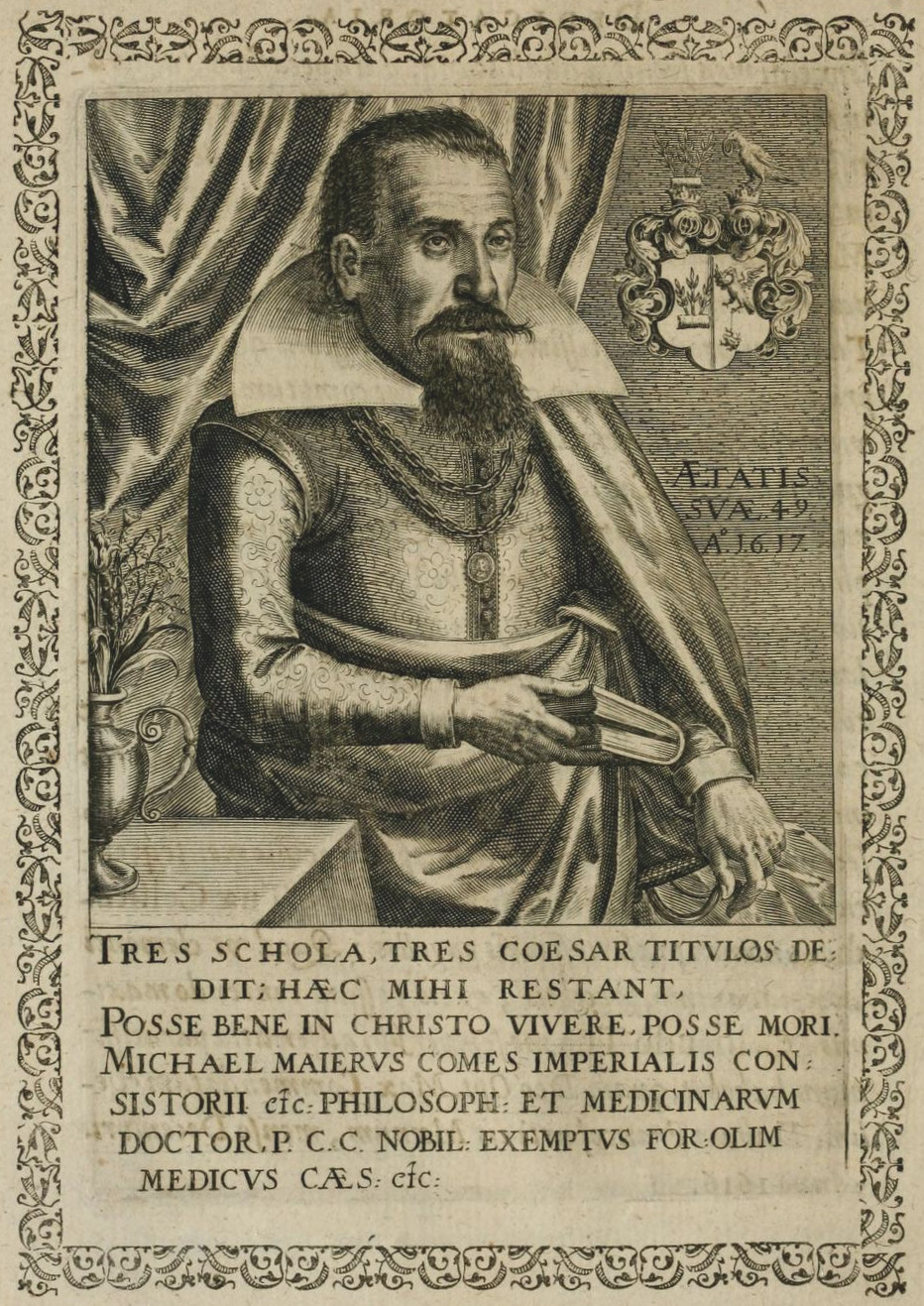
Michael Maier, 1618

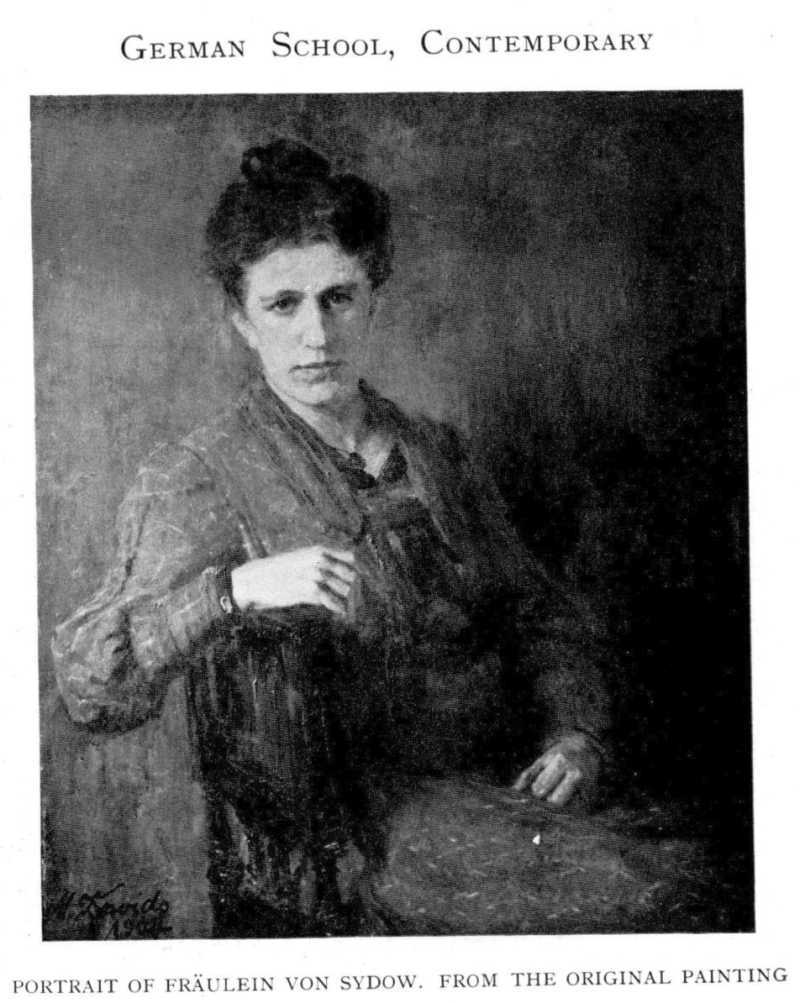
Maria Davids, 1905

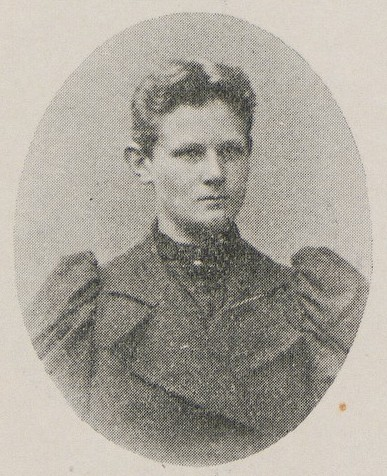
Dagmar Hjort, 1899

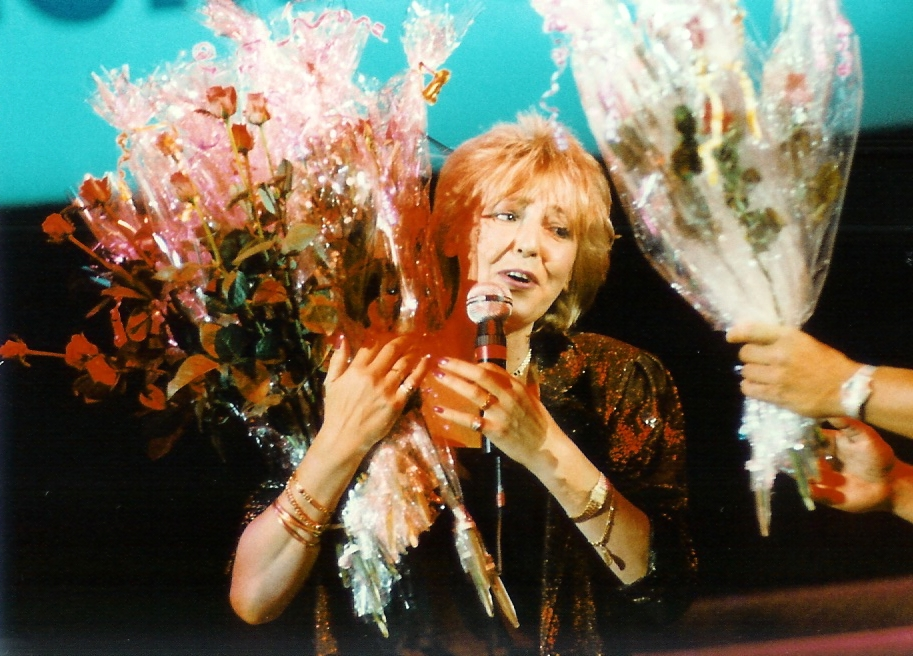
Hanne Haller, 1990

- Michael Maier (1568–1622), physician, counsellor to Rudolf II Habsburg
- Jacob de Petersen (1622-1704) a Danish courtier, politician and diplomat.
- Christian Scriver (1629–1693), Lutheran minister and devotional writer
- Johann von Löwenstern-Kunckel (1630-1703), chemist, born near Rendsburg.
- Marquard Gude (1635–1689), archaeologist and classical scholar.
- Calmer Hambro (1747–1806), Danish merchant and banker
- Bendix Frantz Ludwig Schow (1778–1839), the mayor of Aabenraa from 1805 to 1837.
- Theodor Mommsen (1817–1903), classical scholar, historian, jurist, journalist, politician and archaeologist; Germany's first Nobel Prize winner for literature, lived in Rendsburg for many years
- Heinrich Adolph Leschen (1836–1916), father of gymnastics and pioneer of physiotherapy in South Australia
- Marie Davids (1847–1905), painter
- Eduard von Liebert (1850-1934), military officer, colonial administrator in German East Africa
- Emil Jørgensen, (1858-1942), a Danish architect,
- Dagmar Hjort (1860–1902), Danish schoolteacher, writer and women's rights activist
- Otto Tetens (1865-1945), a German natural scientist with an astronomy background.
- Ludwig Fahrenkrog (1867–1952), writer, playwright and artist
- Gustav Kieseritzky (1893–1943), admiral during WWII
- Hans Friedemann Götze (1897–1940), SS-Standartenführer in the German Waffen-SS
- Otto Ebel von Sosen (1899–1974), musician, conductor and composer.
- Hans Egon Holthusen (1913–1997), lyric poet, essayist, and literary scholar
- Hans Blohm (born 1927), photographer and author, in Canada
- Otto Bernhardt (born 1942), CDU politician
- Hartmut Lutz (born 1945), professor of American and Canadian studies
- Hanne Haller (1950–2005), pop singer, composer, writer, producer and sound engineer
- Gerhard Delling (born 1959), journalist and author
- Jost de Jager (born 1965) CDU politician
- Philip Kraft (born 1969), fragrance chemist
- Noah Wunsch (born 1970), painter, photographer and designer.
- Mareike Wulf (born 1979), politician, has served in Bundestag since 2021.
- Gyde Jensen (born 1989), politician, has served in Bundestag since 2017.

=== Sport ===
- Hans-Ulrich Buchholz (born 1944), rower
- Alexander Kühl (born 1973), basketball player
- Patrik Borger (born 1979), football player and manager
- Lauritz Schoof (born 1990), rower, Olympic team gold medallist at the 2012 Summer Olympics
- Elisa Mevius (born 2004), basketball player, 3x3 Olympic gold medalist at the 2024 Summer Olympics

== Twin towns – sister cities ==
Rendsburg is twinned with:

- Aalborg, Denmark (1976)
- Almere, Netherlands (2014)
- Haapsalu, Estonia (1989)
- Kristianstad, Sweden (1992)
- Lancaster, England (1968)
- Racibórz County, Poland (2004)
- Rathenow, Germany (1990)
- Skien, Norway (1995)
- Vierzon, France (1975)
