= Dagmar Hjort =

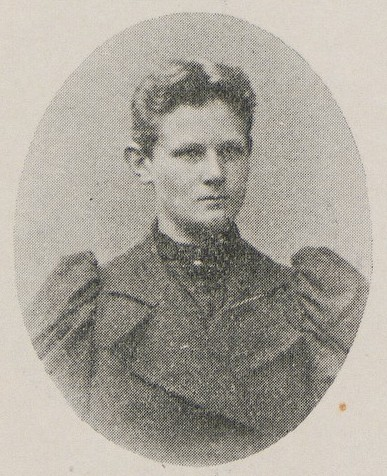
Dagmar Hjort as depicted in Program of 1899 International Congress of Women at which she was a representative

Ane Marie Louise Dagmar Hjort née Harbou (1860–1902) was a Danish schoolteacher, writer and women's rights activist. A member of the Danish Women's Society, she was particularly interested in achieving women's voting rights and became a member of the Danske Kvindeforeningers Valgretsudvalg (Suffrage Committee of Danish Women's Associations) when it was established in 1898. She called not only for equality of the sexes in social, economic and political spheres but for women's liberation from family ties to the home. In addition to the articles she contributed to journals and newspapers, she compiled a history of the women's rights movement in North America. Published posthumously as Kvinderetsbevægelsen i Nordamerika (1906), it was widely used in orienting development of the women's movement in Denmark.

== Biography ==
Born on 13 January 1860 in Rendsburg, Holstein, which was then in Denmark, Ane Marie Louise Dagmar Harbou was the daughter of Major-General Johannes Wilhelm Anthonius Harbou (1810–1091) and Louise Ulrikke Mariane née Hellesen (1833–1897), a philanthropist. In November 1887, she married the school principal Niels Hjort (1862–1917). The couple had two children, Arne (1888) and Aase (1896).

In the late 1870s, she worked for a short period as a private tutor for the mayor of Korsør but then attend N. Zahle's School in Copenhagen together with her younger sisters Alvida and Inger. In 1884, after passing the university entrance exam, she studied mathematics at the University of Copenhagen. After her marriage in 1887, she taught at the Frederiksberg Latin and Realskole where he husband was deputy principal.

Like her elder sister, the nurse Charlotte Norrie, she was an active participant in the women's movement. She contributed articles to various journals, including Kvinden & Samfundet, Tilskueren and Politiken. Together with Charlotte and Alvilda, she was present when the Danske Kvindeforeningers Valgretsudvalg (Suffrage Committee of Danish Women's Associations) was established in 1898. Together with Charlotte, she attended the 1899 congress of the International Council of Women in London where she spoke on conditions for female students in Denmark, a topic she had already covered for the Kvindelig Læseforening (Women Readers' Association) when she called for a reduction in their membership fees. She maintained that the Danish stand on women students, as represented by Emma Gad and Louise Hansen, was too moderate when compared to the positions taken by women's movements in other countries.

Her deepest concern was women's suffrage. While she considered it important to achieve equality of the sexes in social, economic and political spheres, she sought to go much further. In 1899, after the Students Association had been opened up to female membership, she gave a talk on the "Subjective Justification of the Women's Movement", emphasizing the need for women for overcome the constraints of family life. Published in the journal Tilskueren, it led to a controversy with the Social Democrat Education Minister Nina Bang who criticized it as a bourgeois view which did not take account of the needs of working women.

Hjort had worked for some time on a comprehensive history of the women's movement in America. Titled Kvinderetsbevægelsen i Nordamerika, it was published posthumously in 1906. The history was a key reference for orienting further development of the Danish women's movement.

Dagmar Hjort died unexpectedly in Copenhagen on 9 June 1902, following an operation. She was buried in Frederiksberg Ældre Kirkegård.
