= Adolf Noreen =

Swedish linguist (1854–1925)

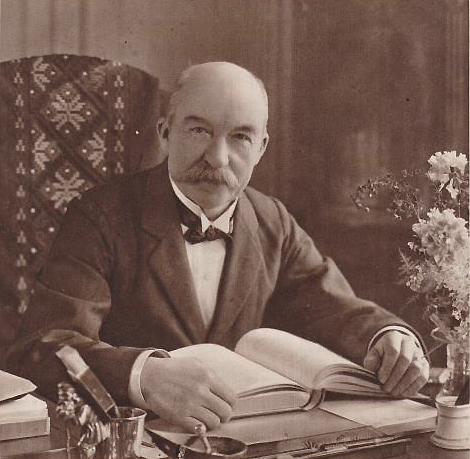
- Noreen in 1917
- Born: 13 March 1854; Östra Ämtervik, Sunne Municipality
- Died: 13 June 1925 (aged 71); Uppsala
- Occupation: Linguist
- Known for: Advocacy for spelling reform

Adolf Gotthard Noreen (13 March 1854 in Östra Ämtervik, Sunne Municipality – 13 June 1925 in Uppsala) was a Swedish linguist who served as a member of the Swedish Academy from 1919 until his death.

Noreen studied at Uppsala University and focused on Swedish dialectology in his earlier works, later shifting to the wider field of historical linguistics. He was a Neogrammarian and supported spelling reform.

== Biography ==
Noreen was born in Värmland. He became a student at Uppsala University in 1871 and went on to complete his doctorate there in 1877; he became a lecturer at the university in the same year. Noreen spent most of 1879 at the University of Leipzig, the home of the Neogrammarian school of linguistics – a school to which Noreen belonged for his entire literary life. Whilst in Leipzig, Noreen was taught Lithuanian by August Leskien, a pioneer of research into sound laws.

Much of Noreen's early output was focused on Swedish dialectology, primarily in his home province of Värmland and the neighbouring province of Dalarna. His work, which was the first in Sweden to utilise the findings of the Neogrammarians, remained influential in the field well into the 20th century. Noreen's academic focus in the 1880s shifted to the field of historical linguistics, primarily centred on the Germanic languages. His grammars of Old West Norse and Old Swedish remain in use by scholars to the present day. In 1887 Noreen was named as the third Professor of Scandinavian languages at Uppsala University. Noreen devoted the last twenty years of his life to writing Vårt språk (Our Language), an ultimately unfinished work in which he outlines his view of the Swedish language, its grammar, phonology and morphology. Noreen was elected to Seat 12 of the Swedish Academy in 1919, following the death of Gustaf Retzius.

Noreen was an advocate of spelling reform. He proposed consistently spelling the sj-sound, voiced palatal approximant, voiceless alveolo-palatal fricative, and /ks/ (all of which continue to have several realisations in Swedish orthography) as "sj", "j", "tj", and "ks", respectively. He also considered "Börjer Jarl" to be an acceptable alternative spelling of Birger Jarl.

Noreen is buried at Uppsala gamla kyrkogård.

== Works ==
- Fryksdalsmålets ljudlära (1877)
- Dalbymålet (1879)
- Fårömålet (1879)
- ‘Sam. Columbus’ En svensk ordeskötsel (with G. Stjernström; 1881)
- Svensk språklära (with E. Schwartz; 1881)
- Dalmålen (1881–83)
- Altislandische und altnorwegische Grammatik (1884)
- Om språkriktighet (1888)
- Utkast til föreläsningar i urgermansk ljudlära med huvudsakligt avseende på de nordiska språken (1888–90)
- Geschichte der germanischen Philologie (1891)
- Valda stycken af svenska författare 1526–1732 (with E. Meyer; 1893)
- Altschwedisches Lesebuch (1892–94)
- Spridda studier (1895)
- Altschwedische Grammatik mit Einschluss des Altgutnischen (1897)
- Vårt språk (1904–24)

Cultural offices
Preceded by Gustaf Retzius	Swedish Academy, Seat No 12; 1919-1925	Succeeded by Bo Bergman
