= Carl Hagenbeck =

German trainer of animals and circus manager

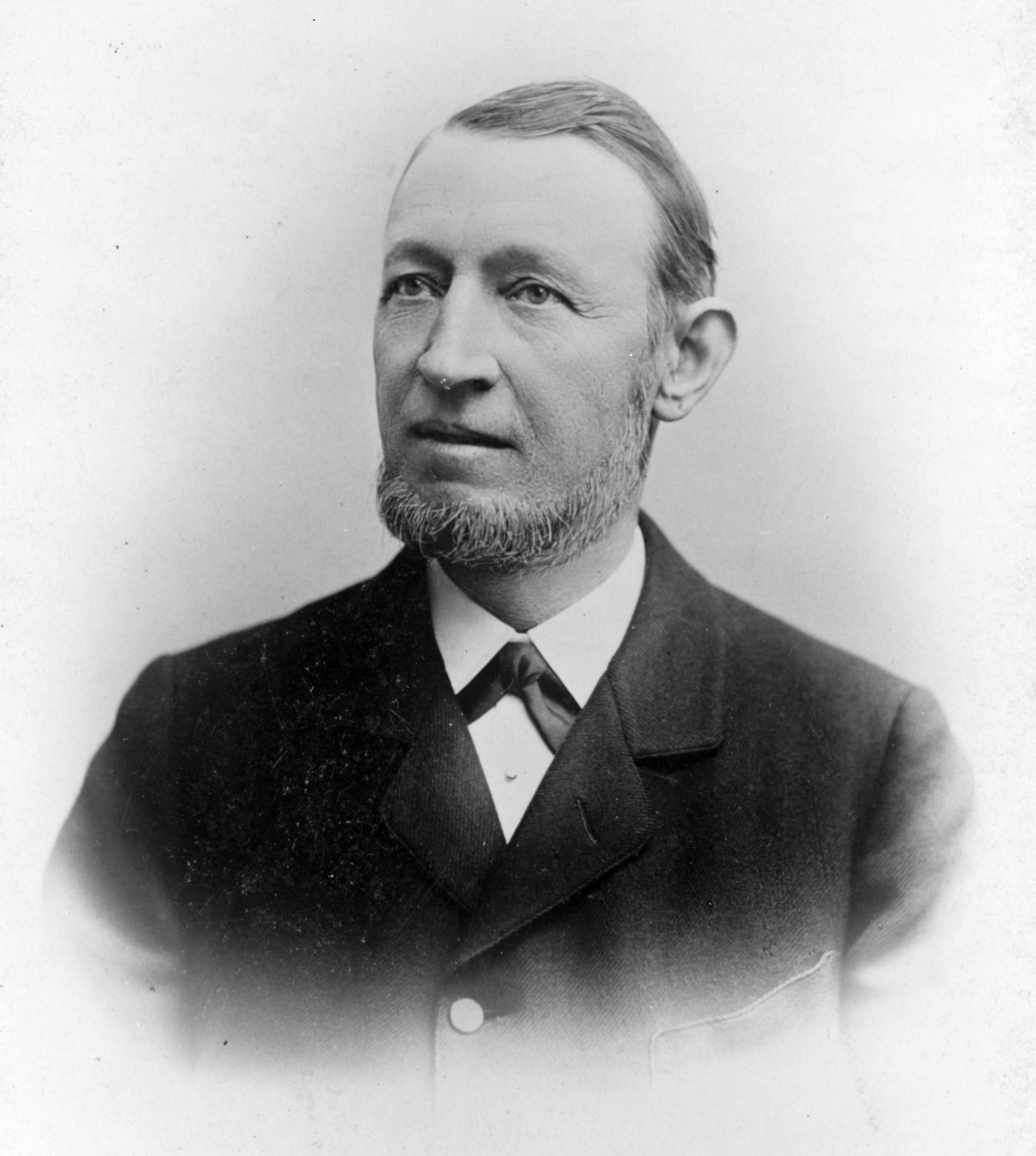
- Born: 10 June 1844; Hamburg, Germany
- Died: 14 April 1913 (aged 68); Hamburg, Germany
- Known for: Tierpark Hagenbeck
- Spouse: Amanda (n. Mehrman)
- Children: 2

Carl Hagenbeck (10 June 1844 – 14 April 1913) was a German merchant of wild animals who supplied many European zoos, as well as P. T. Barnum. He created the modern zoo with animal enclosures without bars, making them appear more like their natural habitat. He was also an ethnography showman and a pioneer in the display of members of "savage tribes" in Völkerschauen, known nowadays in English as "ethnic shows" or "human zoos". These racist displays were controversial at the time and are now widely considered unethical. The transformation of the zoo architecture initiated by him is known as the Hagenbeck revolution. Hagenbeck founded Germany's most successful privately owned zoo, the Tierpark Hagenbeck, which moved to its present location in Hamburg's Stellingen district in 1907.

== Biography ==
Hagenbeck was born on 10 June 1844, to Claus Gottfried Carl Hagenbeck (1810–1887), a fishmonger who ran a side business buying, showing, and selling exotic animals.

When Hagenbeck was 14, his father gave him some seals and a polar bear. He took a more proactive role in the animal trade and his collection of animals grew until he needed large buildings to keep them. Hagenbeck left his home in Hamburg to accompany hunters and explorers on trips to jungle regions and snow-clad mountains. He captured animals in nearly every continent in the world. In 1874, on the suggestion of Heinrich Leutemann, a painter and friend of the family, he decided to exhibit Samoan and Sámi people (then known as Laplanders) as "purely natural" populations, with their tents, weapons, sleds, near a group of reindeer, as the animal display business was undergoing a downturn.

In 1875, Hagenbeck began to exhibit his animals in all the large cities of Europe as well as in the United States, merging his interests in commercial success, the preservation and "acclimatization" of animals, and bringing the "exotic" to industrializing countries.

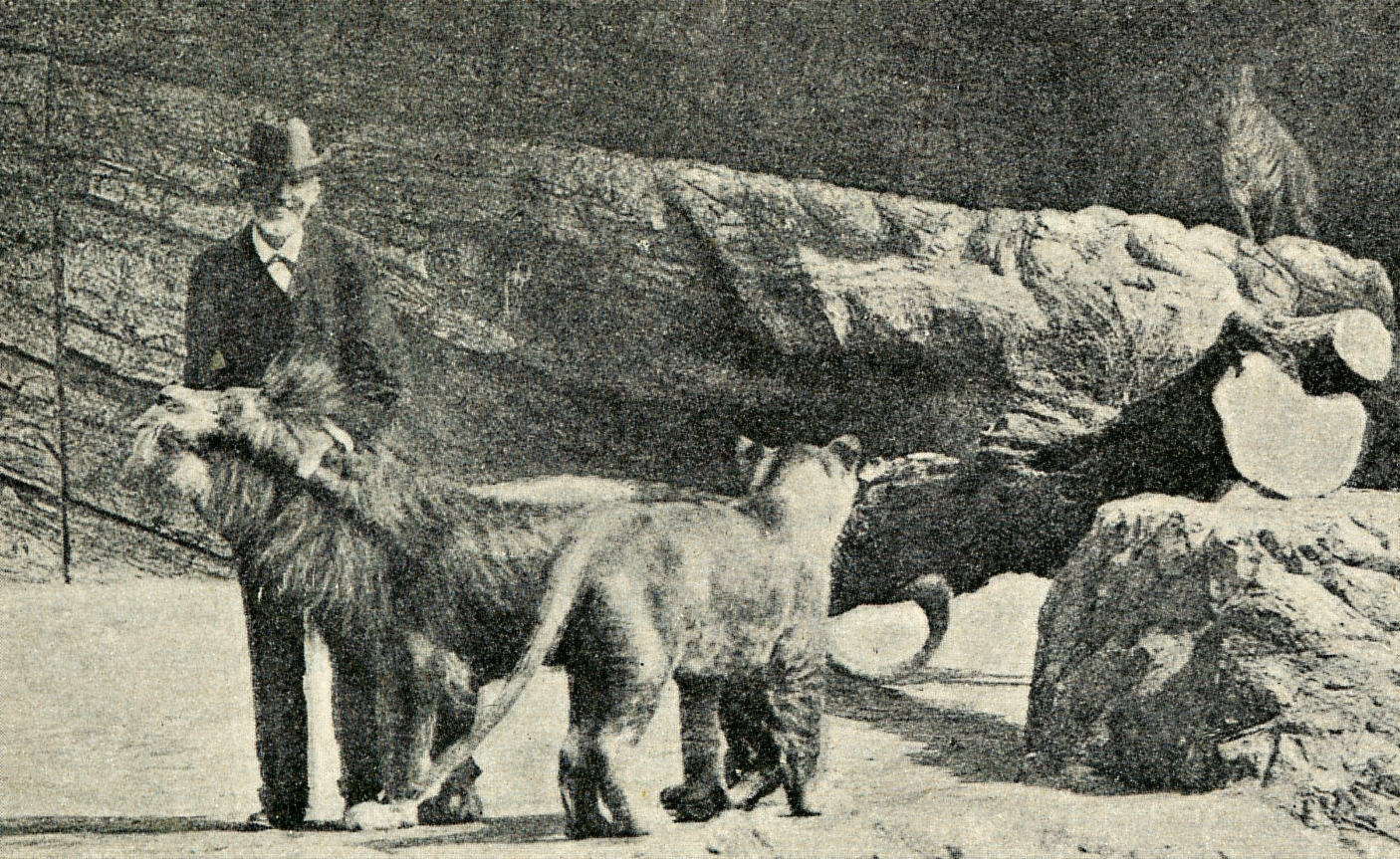
Hagenbeck with his lions

In 1876, he sent a collaborator to the Egyptian Sudan to bring back some wild beasts and Nubians. The Nubian exhibit was a success in Europe, and toured Paris, London, and Berlin. In 1880, his agent Johan Adrian Jacobsen recruited a group of eight Labrador Inuit. The group toured Hamburg, Berlin, Prague, Frankfurt, Darmstadt, Krefeld and Paris. One member of the group, Abraham Ulrikab, kept a diary during his travels in Europe. All eight Inuit were killed by smallpox; Jacobsen had failed to arrange for the Inuit to receive the inoculations they were legally require to have. Medical tests became a standard feature of recruitment for the shows afterwards.

Hagenbeck's exhibit of human beings, considered as "savages in a natural state" was the probable source of inspiration for Albert Geoffroy Saint-Hilaire's similar "human zoo" exhibition in the Jardin d'acclimatation in Paris. Saint-Hilaire organized in 1877 two "ethnological exhibitions", presenting Nubians and Greenlandic Inuit to the public, thereby doubling the number of visitors of the zoo.

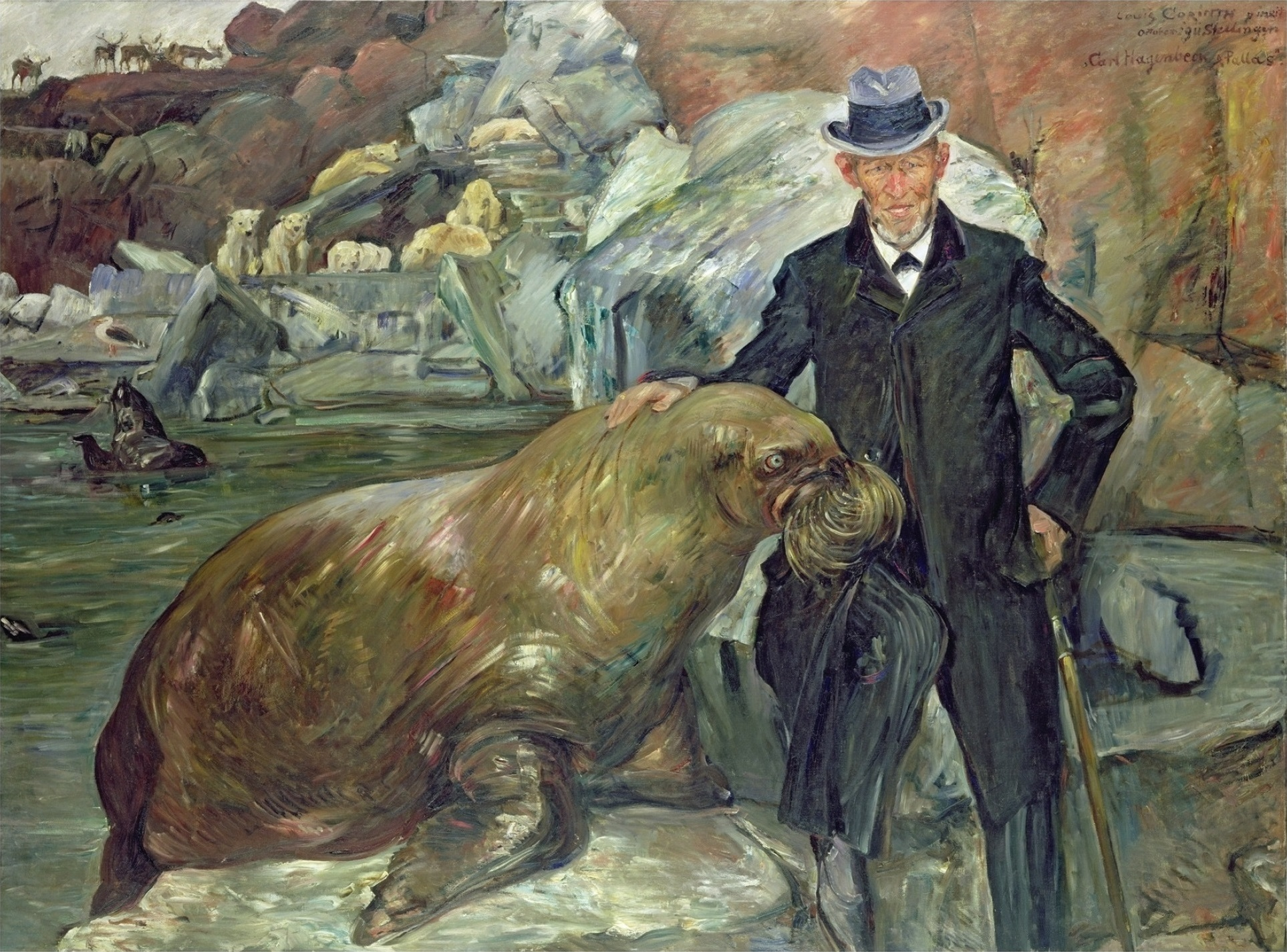
Portrait of Carl Hagenbeck in his Zoo by Lovis Corinth (1911), oil on canvas, 200 × 271 cm, Hamburger Kunsthalle, Hamburg, Germany

Hagenbeck also trained animals for his circuses at the World's Columbian Exposition in Chicago, Illinois, in 1893, and the Louisiana Purchase Exposition in St. Louis in 1904. Hagenbeck's circus was one of the most popular attractions. His collection included large animals and reptiles. Many of the animals were trained to do tricks. The circus that Hagenbeck assembled for the Louisiana Purchase Expo was purchased and merged into the B. E. Wallace Circus as the Hagenbeck–Wallace Circus. Hagenbeck's trained animals also performed at amusement parks in New York City's Coney Island before 1914.

Hagenbeck planned a permanent exhibit where animals could live in surroundings like their natural homes. Despite the existence of the Zoological Garden of Hamburg, Hagenbeck opened his great zoo, the Tierpark Hagenbeck at Stellingen, near Hamburg in 1907.

In 1909–1910 he supervised the building of the Giardino Zoologico in Rome.

In 1905, Hagenbeck used his skills as an animal collector to capture a thousand camels for the German Empire for use in Africa. He described his adventures and his methods of capturing and training animals in his book Beasts and Men, published in 1909.

Hagenbeck was one of the first Europeans to report living dinosaurs. In Beasts and Men Hagenbeck claimed he had received reports of "a huge monster, half elephant, half dragon" inhabiting the interior of Rhodesia. Hagenbeck thought the animal was some kind of dinosaur similar to a Brontosaurus and unsuccessfully searched for it. His claim made headlines in newspapers around the world and helped launch legends of living dinosaurs.

Hagenbeck died on 14 April 1913 in Hamburg from a bite by a snake, probably a boomslang. After Hagenbeck's death, his sons Heinrich and Lorenz continued the zoo and circus business; the Nazis banned the Völkerschauen upon coming to power, as they were opposed to the possibility of sexual relationships between the performers and German citizens. The Hamburg zoo still retains his name.

== See also ==
- Hagenbeck–Wallace Circus, a circus which incorporated the American one founded by Hagenbeck
- Salt and Sauce, United Kingdom elephants originally bought and imported by Carl Hagenbeck
