= Diax =

Series of 35mm cameras

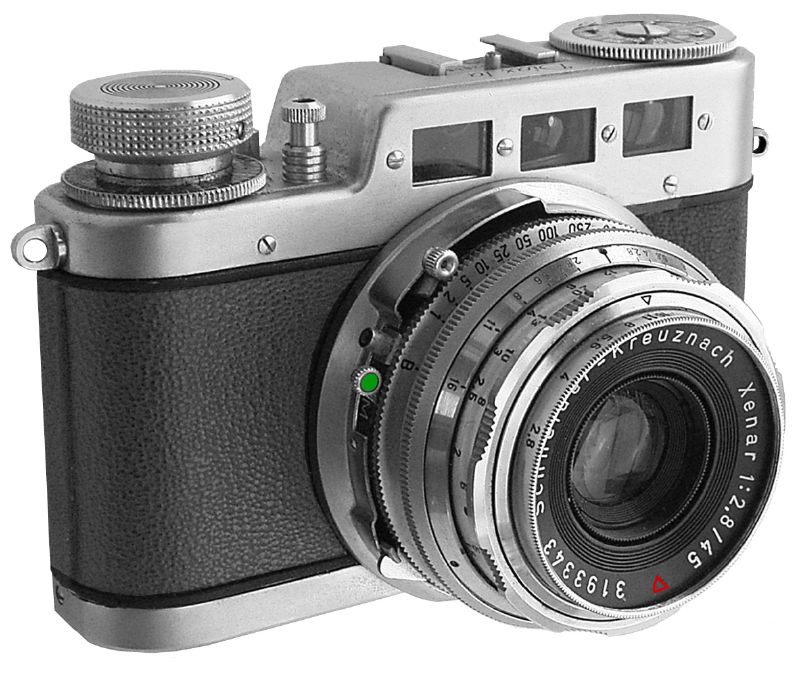
- Diax Ia

Overview
- Type: 35mm viewfinder camera

Focusing
- Focus: manual

Exposure/metering
- Exposure: manual

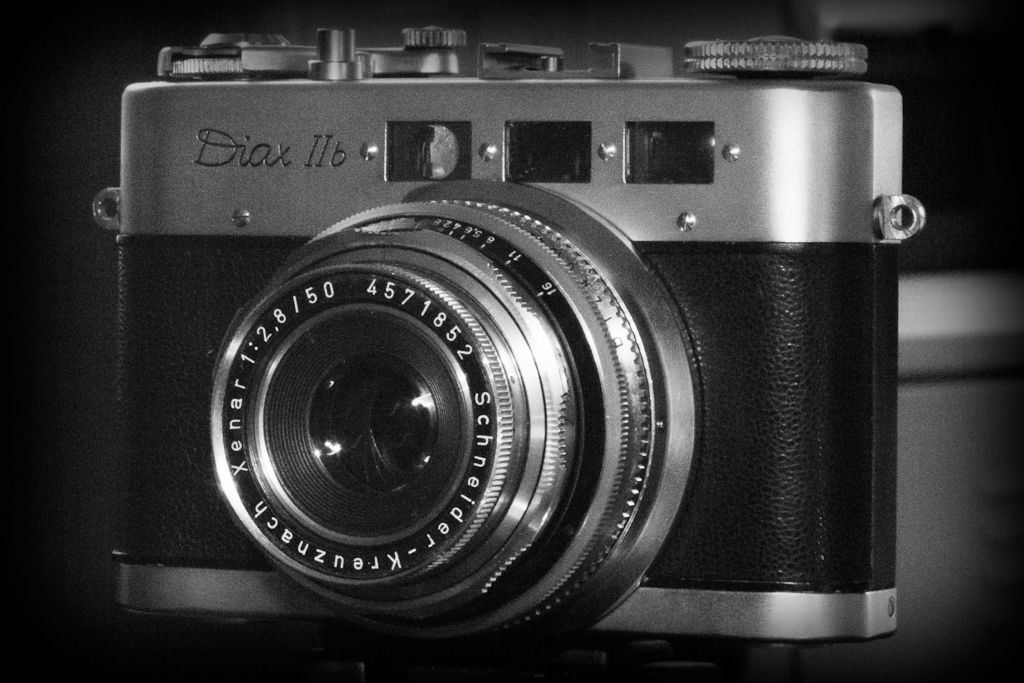
Diax IIb

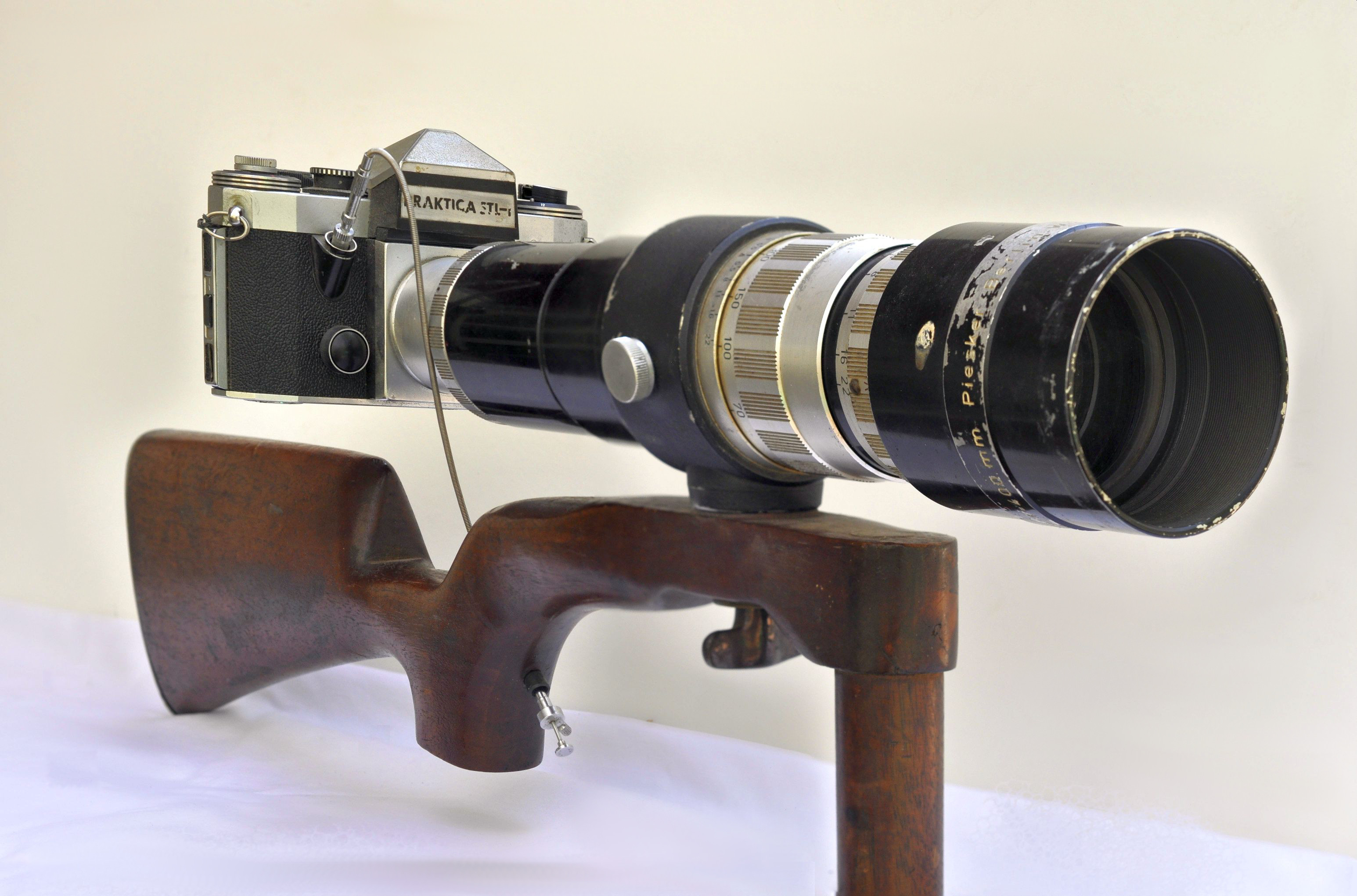
400 mm lens by Voss

Diax is a series of 35mm viewfinder and rangefinder cameras made from 1947 to 1957 by the German company Walter Voss, based in Ulm. The Diax camera was the brainchild of Walter Voss who registered the name Diax in 1945, established Walter Voss Photokamera-Fabrikation & Feinmechanik in 1946 and began producing Diax cameras in 1947. Over ten years in business Voss company produced and sold around 100,000 Diax cameras and employed at maximum 64 people.

A characteristic model was the Diax Ia for interchangeable lenses, with 3 different viewfinders in the top, each in a different color: blue for 35mm lenses, yellow for 85 or 90mm lenses and neutral for 45 or 50 mm lenses. The Diax II and Diax IIa were rangefinder cameras, while the Diaxette had no focus assistance. The b models were like the a models, but with a rapid film advance lever. The Diax system also included 10 lens types covering 6 focal lengths with a common filter thread size of 40.5mm.
