= Johan Adrian Jacobsen =

Norwegian ethnologist and adventurer (1853–1937)

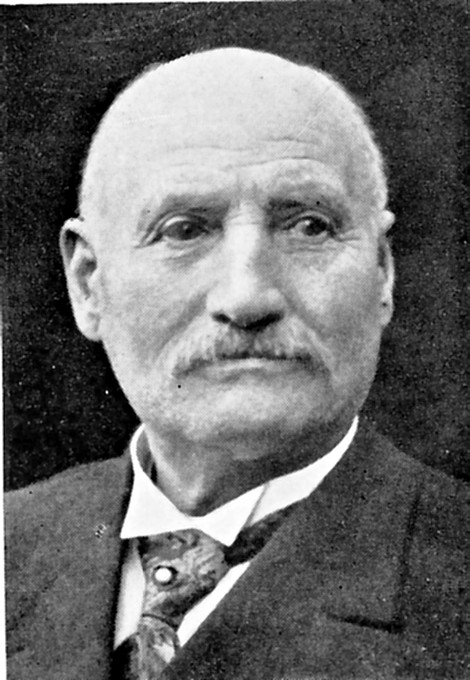
- Born: 1853; Risøya, Tromsø, Norway
- Died: 1947 (aged 93–94)
- Scientific career
- Fields: Ethnology

Johan Adrian Jacobsen (1853 in Risøya, Tromsø – 1947) was a Norwegian ethnologist and adventurer. He is mainly known as a collector of ethnographical objects, and a recruiter of indigenous peoples for the ethnographical shows organized by Carl Hagenbeck, founder of Tierpark Hagenbeck, a zoo in Hamburg. Starting in mid-1881, Jacobsen was hired by the Berlin Museum für Völkerkunde to gather ethnographic objects and other specimens. His travels took him from the Arctic to South America, North America, Korea, Japan, Siberia, and the South Sea Islands.

== Biography ==
For seven years, beginning in 1867, Jacobsen was member of a whaling crew on the Spitsbergen and Murman coasts. In 1876/7 he traveled along the west coast of South America. When he returned to Hamburg in 1877, he was hired by Carl Hagenbeck to recruit Greenlanders for his live exhibitions of indigenous people. In 1880, once again on behalf of Hagenbeck, Jacobsen recruited a group of eight Labrador Inuit, among which was Abraham Ulrikab. Unfortunately, this show ended in tragedy as, within four months, all Inuit had been killed by smallpox.

In mid-1881, Jacobsen was engaged by the Berlin Museum für Völkerkunde to gather ethnographic and other specimens on the west coast of North America. For the next two years, he traveled through British Columbia, Yukon, and Alaska. The museum later sent him on expeditions to Korea, Japan, Siberia, the South Sea Islands, etc.

In 1885, Jacobsen was back in British Columbia, Canada, where he and his brother Bernard Filip hired a group of nine Nuxalk (Bella Coola). Johan Adrian Jacobsen brought them back to Europe and traveled with them until 1887.

Subsequently, he made ethnographic collections in Germany and Norway.

At the Columbian Exposition of 1893, Jacobsen exhibited an ethnographic collection from 25 non-European peoples. This formed the nucleus around which developed the Field Columbian Museum of Chicago.

== Works ==
Publications include:

Year	Title	ISBN
1884	Capitain Jacobsen's Reise an der Nordwestküste Amerikas, 1881-1883 (Captain Jacobsen's Journey to the Northwest Coast of America, 1881–1883) Edited by Adrian Woldt. Leipzig: Max Spohr.	-
1889	A. Jacobsen's und H. Kuhn's Reise in Niederländisch-Indien (A. Jacobsen's and H. Kuhn's Voyage in the Dutch Indies)	-
1894	Eventyrlige farter, fortalte for ungdommen	-
1896	Reise in der inselwelt des Banda-Meeres (Exploring the Island World of the Banda Sea)	-
1931	Die weisse Grenze: Abenteuer eines alter Seebären rund um den Polarkreis. (The White Frontier: Adventures of an Old Sailor all around the Arctic Circle). Leipzig: F.A. Brockhaus.	-
1977	Alaskan Voyage, 1881–1883: An Expedition to the Northwest Coast of America. Abridged translation by Erna Gunther, from the German text by Adrian Woldt (1884). University of Chicago Press, Chicago, IL	-
2014	Jacobsen, Johan Adrian. Voyage with the Labrador Eskimos, 1880-1881. Gatineau (Quebec): Polar Horizons. (English translation by Hartmut Lutz of Jacobsen's 1880-1881 diary)	978-0-9936740-5-1 (paperback) 978-0-9936740-1-3 (pdf) - Out of print.
2014	Jacobsen, Johan Adrian, Voyage avec les Eskimos du Labrador, 1880-1881. Gatineau (Quebec): Horizons Polaires. (French translation by Jacqueline Thun of Jacobsen's 1880-1881 diary).	978-0-9936740-4-4 (paperback) 978-0-9936740-0-6 (pdf)
2019	Jacobsen, Johan Adrian. Voyage with the Labrador Eskimos, 1880-1881. Second enlarged edition. Gatineau (Quebec): Polar Horizons. (English translation of Johan Adrian Jacobsen's diary by Lutz, Hartmut and Riedel, Dieter)	978-1-7750815-3-1 (softcover) 978-1-7750815-4-8 (epub)
