= Jake Gold's Old Curiosity Shop =

Jake Gold's Old Curiosity Shop (a.k.a. Gold's Free Museum) was the first Indian curio business in Santa Fe and was in existence between 1880 and 1905. It was said to have been established already in 1862 but that year is just referring to when Jake came to Santa Fe to help his father. The old adobe building known as the Old Curiosity Shop had wood carrying burros in front of and or around the corner on Burro Alley. The outlook made the shop on San Francisco street a favorite subject for photographers of the late 19th century.

== The beginning ==
The name Jake Gold is referring to Isac Jacob Gold (1851-1905). He was the son of Louis Gold, a Polish merchant active in Santa Fe from 1850s to 1880. Louis were soon joined by his sons Adrian (1845-1884) in 1855, Abe in 1859 and Jake in 1862. All three had previously lived in New York with their mother. The first known ad for the shop is from February 27 in the Daily New Mexican and is for "Gold's Provision House". At that time the shop offered groceries and provisions but was also said to be "the only place in town where rare specimens of indian pottery, ancient and modern" could be purchased.

Jake secured his first business license in August 1876, registering as a viandante, which could mean "peddler" or "itinernat merchant". In May 1881 he leased six rooms across the street from Aaron's store. By 1883 he had taken over Aaron's shop and the shop grew fast.

== The shop in the 1890s ==
The deliberately cluttered and thick dusted interior of his ancient appearing place was alluring to tourists. Jake Gold was a skilled salesman and he cast himself on a souvenir portrait card as a moustached, frilly leather jacketed rugged frontiersman complete with a muzzle-loaded pistol stuck in his braided shash belt. He was equally colorful in discourse, "The tourists want to hear tales, and I am here to administer the same." In a 1894 article about his store explains that visitors were greeted by a parrot that said "Good morning, my dog" in Spanish. Jake Gold's curio store and pioneering mail order catalogs faded as his legal troubles mounted and his health declined. Jake was dogged by legal problems and lost the shop in 1899 and went to state penitentiary. His friend Jesus Sito Candelario took care of his business during this time and later Gold started working for Candelario. The partnership lasted only a year and Gold died shortly after. There are photos of the shop that are said to have been taken after 1905 so if this is correct the shop remained after Golds death. Many of the objects that were sold in the shop are today in museums all over the world. In 2010 there were still a yellow store with the carreta on the roof just a few doors away and on the same side of the street.

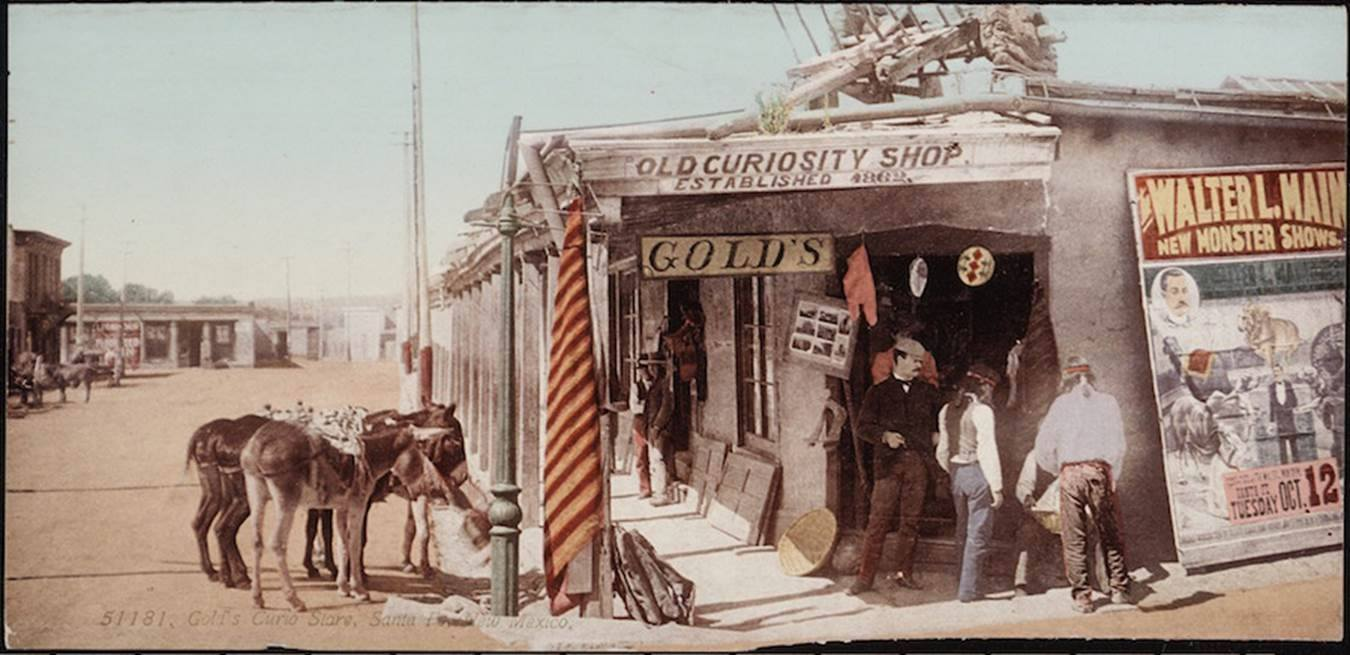
Jake Gold's Old Curiosity Shop, 1897.

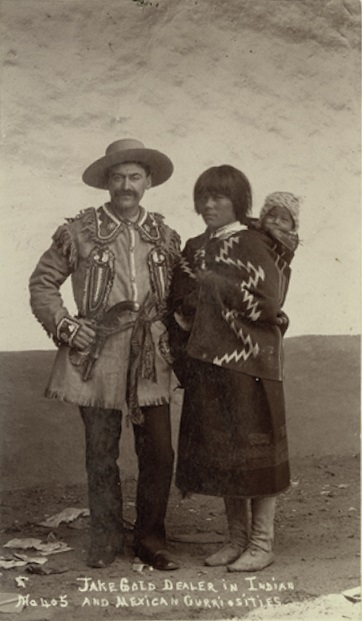
Jake Gold and unidentified Pueblo woman with child, ca. 1885–1890.

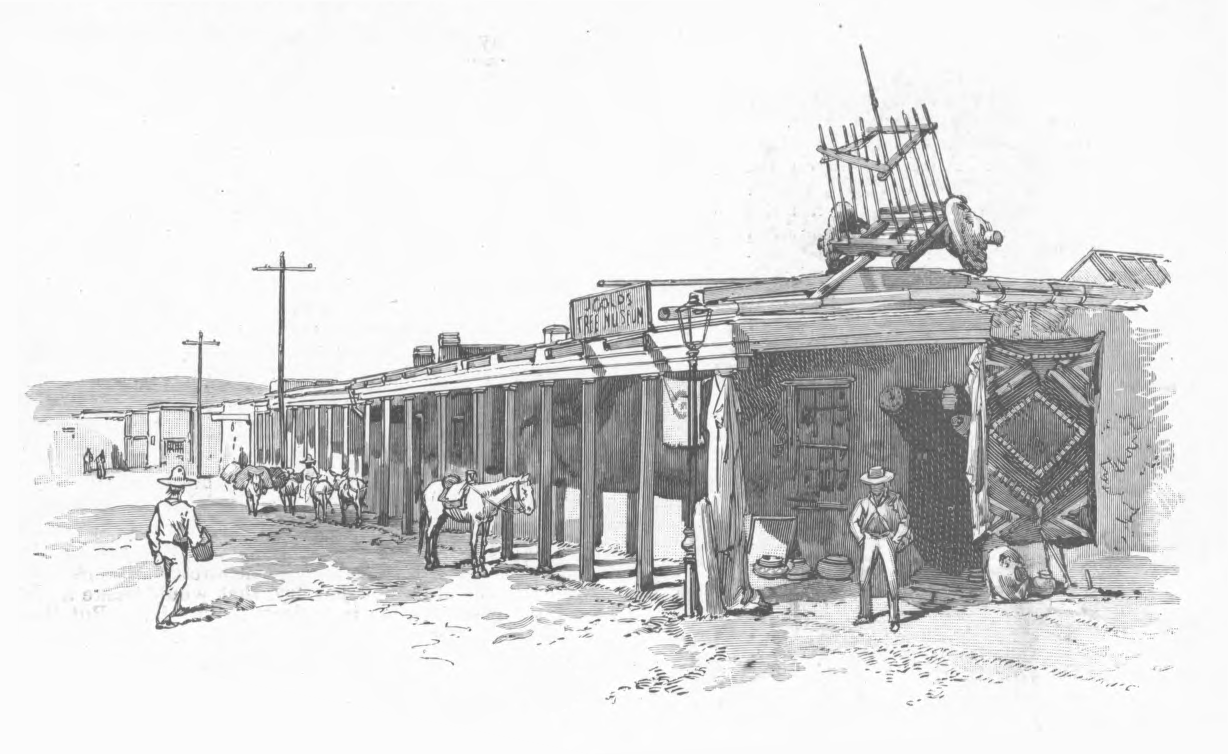
Gold's Free Museum in 1890
