= Albert Geoffroy Saint-Hilaire =

French zoologist and ornithologist (1835–1919)

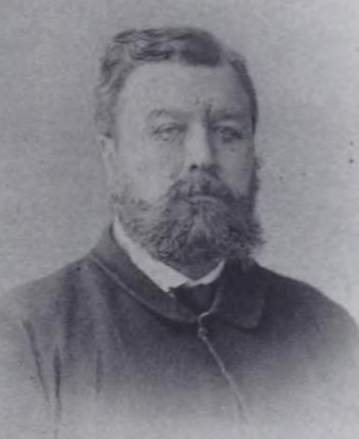
Albert Geoffroy Saint-Hilaire in 1887

Albert Geoffroy Saint-Hilaire (December 2, 1835 – January 30, 1919) was a French zoologist who served as a director of the Jardin d'acclimatation du Bois de Boulogne in Paris from 1865 to 1893. He was the son of the zoologist Isidore Geoffroy Saint-Hilaire (1805–1861) and grandson of the naturalist Étienne Geoffroy Saint-Hilaire (1772–1844).

== Life and work ==
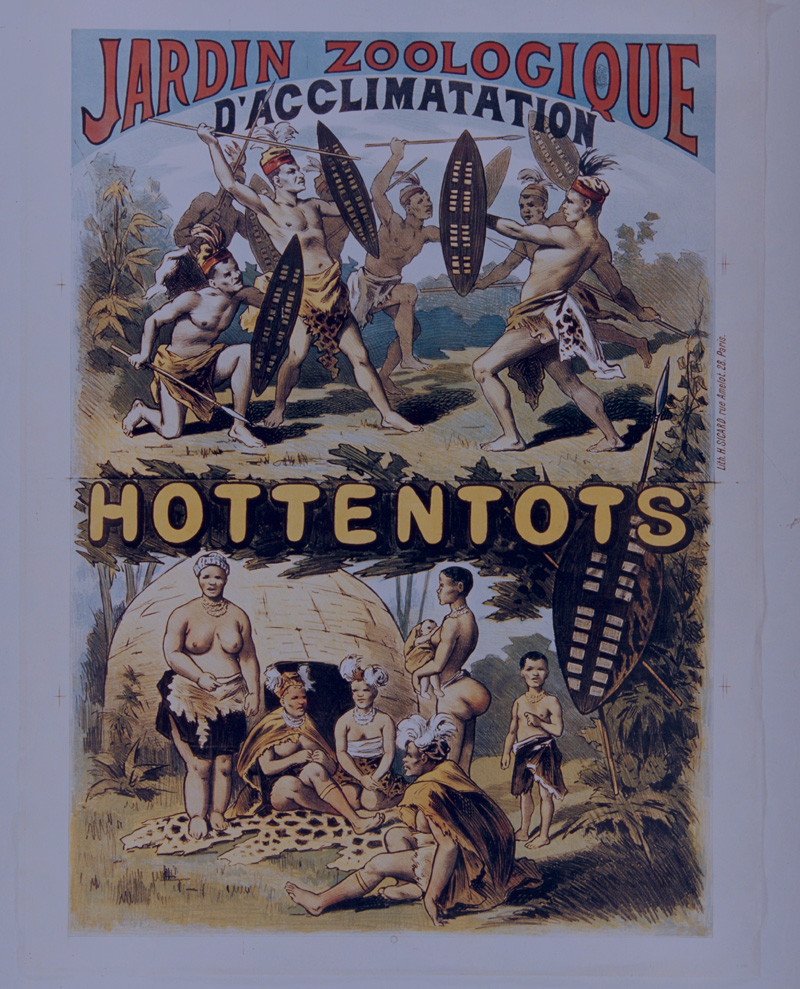
Poster for a "Human Zoo" exhibition in 1877

Saint-Hilaire was born in Paris in a well-known family of zoologists. He graduated in 1855 and worked for his father and was involved in developing the Jardin d'acclimatation which had been founded by his father. In the 1860s it drew nearly a quarter million visitors a year. Albert became its director in 1865 at a time when its finances were very poor. He tried to convert the institution from a utilitarian one to a profit-seeking attraction. During the Paris Commune in 1870–71 the Jardin became home to 130,000 sheep and 20,000 cattle meant to feed Paris. The other animals were sent to Antwerp and Brussels by train and a few of the other animals were killed and exotic meats were served in special events. Following this turbulent period he rebuilt the institution and received gifts of animals from zoos across Europe and in 1874 he was able to draw 600,000 visitors again. The tradition of exotic animal meat eating was continued. He then became involved in attracting the masses with exhibitions of human ethnology which drew large crowds. These included displays of Nubians, Eskimos, Argentine Gauchos and dwarfs who were claimed to be from the Kingdom of Lilliput. He was made a knight of the Legion of Honour in 1880. By 1893 the Jardin was on the edge of bankruptcy and Saint-Hilaire resigned.
