= Alootook Ipellie =

Inuk graphic artist and author from Canada (1951–2007)

- Born: Alootook Ipellie; 1951; Nuvuqquq, Northwest Territories, Canada
- Died: September 8, 2007 (aged 56); Ottawa, Canada
- Occupations: Graphic artist, satirical cartoonist, poet, photographer
- Relatives: Taina Ipellie (daughter), Ennutsiak (grandfather)
- Writing career
- Language: Inuktitut, English
- Genres: Graphic novel; satire; cartoon
- Notable works: Arctic Dreams and Nightmares (1993)
- Notable awards: Canadian Cartoonist Hall of Fame, 2016

Alootook Ipellie (1951 in Nuvuqquq, Northwest Territories – September 8, 2007, in Ottawa) was an Inuk graphic artist, political and satirical cartoonist, writer, photographer, and Inuktitut translator.

== Early life and education ==
Ipellie was born in the small hunting camp of Nuvuqquq near Frobisher Bay, Northwest Territories, now known as Iqaluit, Nunavut on Baffin Island. His father, Joanassie, died in a hunting accident before Ipellie's first birthday, and his mother, Napatchie, moved with him to the hamlet of Frobisher Bay. "He spent his childhood and early teenage years adjusting to the transition from the traditional nomadic Inuit way of life to life in government-sponsored Inuit settlements." His grandfather was the sculptor Ennutsiak.

There was no high school in his community so Ipellie had to move to complete his education. He ended up at Ottawa's High School of Commerce where he discovered his artistic ability. Ipellie eventually settled in Ottawa.

== Career ==
Ipellie worked as a journalist, cartoonist and editor for Inuit Monthly (a.k.a. Inuit Today) during the 1970s and 80s. In 1974, he started producing the comic strip "Ice Box" that became a regular feature in Inuit Monthly. "The cartoons featured the Nook family and provided northern readers with a humorous look at issues affecting the Arctic. The Nooks, like Ipellie himself, were living through a transitional period in the North during which traditional Inuit language, social structure, and means of survival were being superseded by the new social, religious, and political structures of the South."

He also participated in films like The Owl and the Raven and Legends and Life of the Inuit.

He then went on to create the comic strip Nuna and Vut in the 1990s. These cartoons explored Inuit life during the creation of Nunavut. Using humour and illustrations, he commented on the social issues and inequity in Inuit communities.

Some of his poetry "The Igloos Are Calm in the Camp," "The Dancing Sun," "The Water Moved an Instant Before" were published in special issues of Canadian Literature. Professor Michael P. J. Kennedy believes "Ipellie to be one of Canada's finest, and under-rated, aboriginal writers."

He collaborated with authors providing the illustrations to books like Paper stays put: a collection of Inuit writing edited by Robin Gedalof.

Ipellie made a significant contribution to the literature of Canada with the publication of his short story collection Arctic Dreams and Nightmares, presenting the changes and challenges faced by Inuit. This was the first published work by an Inuk author.

=== Poetry and prose ===
In 1971, the Department of Indian Affairs and Northern Development (DIAND), published three of then 17-year-old Ipellie's illustrated poems in their magazine, North.

In his poem entitled "Hot to Warm and Cool to Cold", he wrote,

"The mosquitos are at large today
As the wind stills, as the sun heats,
And we walk the rocks under,
Searching the hills for the meat
And hide of the useful caribou
that feeds and clothes my family,
Through four different seasons
When the winds change from
Hot to warm, and cool to cold."

— Ipellie Alootook. 1971.

Other poems that have been published in poetry anthologies and journals, include "Nipikti the Old Man Carver," "Frobisher Bay Childhood," "Damn Those Invaders" and "Siqiniq 'The Sun'".

In 1980, Ipellie collaborated with Robin Gedalof in the University of Washington Press publication of Paper Stays Put: A Collection of Inuit Writing—a collection of "stories, poems, essays, plays, memoirs and songs" written by Inuit from Canada and illustrated by Ipellie, that was used as a GED teacher's.

In 1993, the first book that exclusively featured Ipellie's stories and his pen and ink drawings, was published—Arctic Dreams and Nightmares.

In 2005, Ipellie wrote the foreword for the illustrated book entitled The Diary of Abraham Ulrikab: Text and Context, the story of Ulrikab (1845 - 1881) who became an attraction in one of Carl Hagenbeck's ethnographical shows in Hamburg, Germany. The book was published in German in 2007.

His 2007 illustrated book entitled The Inuit Thought of It: Amazing Arctic Innovations and translated into French as Innovations inuites: il fallait y penser—co-authored by David MacDonald, received a number of awards, including the Canadian Children’s Book Centre's Best Books for Kids & Teens in 2008.

He co-authored content for Inuit.net with Carol Rigby on Nunavut.

His 2009 illustrated book entitled I Shall Wait and Wait, which was published after he had died, described the traditional Inuit seal hunt.

== Artwork in public collections ==
Ipellie's artwork has been included in a number of public collections and galleries including in the Carleton University Art Gallery, the Canada Council Art Bank in Ottawa, and the Richard F. Brush Art Gallery at St. Lawrence University in New York.

== Awards and honours ==
In 2019, Ipellie was inducted into the Canadian Cartoonists Hall of Fame.

== Death ==
Ipellie died of a heart attack in Ottawa, Ontario at the age of 56 and is survived by his daughter, Taina Ipellie.
