= University of Ottawa Press =

- Status: Active
- Founded: 1931
- Country of origin: Canada
- Headquarters location: Ottawa, Ontario
- Distribution: English: University of Toronto Press (Canada); Ingram Content Group (US); Marston Book Services (UK); French: Prologue (Canada); Ingram Content Group (US); Distribution du Nouveau Monde (France); Servidis (Switzerland); Exportlivre (rest of world)
- Publication types: Books, E-books
- Official website: press.uottawa.ca

The University of Ottawa Press (French: Les Presses de l'Université d'Ottawa) is a bilingual university press located in Ottawa, Ontario. It publishes approximately 25-30 books annually in both English and French. The UOP is the only fully bilingual university publishing house in Canada.

Like other university presses, the publishing program at the University of Ottawa Press includes scholarly works, textbooks and, on occasion, books of general interest. While the UOP publishes volumes on a broad variety of subjects, it specializes in four main subject areas: social and cultural studies, translation and interpretation, political and international affairs, and literature and the arts.

The press is currently a member of the Association of University Presses.

== History ==
In 1930, professors from the faculty of philosophy and theology at the University of Ottawa decided to publish a periodical that would "favour the development of higher culture". The first edition, titled La revue de l'Université d'Ottawa, appeared in January 1931.

The 1930s brought about a rapid increase in scholarly output from professors, who are frequently pressured to "publish or perish." As a result, the University of Ottawa decided that other avenues for publishing were required to help its professors disseminate their research. To meet this need, the university created Les Éditions de l'Université d'Ottawa in the fall of 1936, the first francophone university press in Canada.

The UOP's first volume appeared in 1937: Pierre Le Moyne, Sieur d'Iberville by Father Louis LeJeune. During the next 8 years, Les Éditions published 51 books. The first English title, Ottawa, Old and New by Lucien Brault, a history professor, was published in 1946. Forty years later, Les Éditions de l'Université d'Ottawa became the University of Ottawa Press (Les Presses de l'Université d'Ottawa).

Since its founding, the UOP has published over 750 titles, of which some 400 are still in print.
