= Hammond Circus train wreck =

1918 deadly train collision in Gary, Indiana, United States

Coordinates: 41°35′54″N 87°25′17″W

Hammond circus train wreck
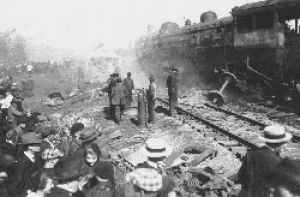

Details
- Date: June 22, 1918; 4:00 am
- Location: Near Hammond, Indiana
- Country: United States
- Operator: Michigan Central Railroad
- Incident type: Collision
- Cause: Engineer falling asleep

Statistics
- Trains: 2
- Deaths: 86
- Injured: 127

The Hammond circus train wreck occurred on June 22, 1918, and was one of the worst train wrecks in U.S. history. Eighty-six people were reported to have died and another 127 were injured when a locomotive engineer fell asleep and ran his troop train into the rear of a circus train near Hammond, Indiana. The circus train held 400 performers and roustabouts of the Hagenbeck–Wallace Circus.

== Circus train wreck ==
The train used by the Hagenbeck–Wallace Circus used old wooden cars that were lit with oil lamps. The circus train had two train segments; the segment that was loaded with animals had been dispatched earlier, leaving the train with all the performers and workers on the tracks. The cars were being moved to a spot near Hammond, Indiana, so a mechanical problem could be addressed, and some of the cars had been left on the main line track.

In the early morning hours of June 22, 1918, engineer Alonzo Sargent was at the throttle of a Michigan Central (then a subsidiary of the New York Central Railroad) troop train pulled by MC/NYC class K80r 4-6-2 "Pacific" number 8485, pulling twenty empty Pullman cars. Sargent, who was aware that his train was closely following a slower circus train, had slept little if at all in the preceding twenty-four hours. The effects of a lack of sleep, several heavy meals, some kidney pills, and the gentle rolling of his locomotive are thought to have caused him to fall asleep at the controls.

At approximately 4 a.m., Sargent missed at least two automatic signals and warnings posted by a brakeman of the 26-car circus train, which had made an emergency stop to check a hot box on one of the flatcars. Sargent's train plowed into the caboose and four rear wooden sleeping cars of the circus train at a rail crossing known as Ivanhoe Interlocking (5 miles (8.0 km) east of downtown Hammond and the Indiana-Illinois border) at an estimated speed of 35 miles per hour (56 km/h). According to a contemporary newspaper report, “The engine and tender of the moving train passed completely over and through the wreck. The engine left the rails but did not overturn.” Upon impact, the circus train's lamps ignited the wooden cars and the fire quickly spread.

Two men were stationed at the Ivanhoe signal tower, about 100 feet (30 m) from the accident, and phoned multiple people in an attempt to raise help for the victims. The first on the scene was the mayor of nearby Gary, Indiana, who brought the fire chief, and then phoned all the medical personnel he could. Triage for the victims was performed at the Michigan Central station in Hammond; then they were sent to St. Margaret's Hospital.

== Victims ==
Most of the eighty-six who were killed in the train wreck perished in the first thirty-five seconds after the collision. Then, the wreckage caught on fire. The fire was so intense that many of the victims were assumed to be some of the African-American porters on the train, until further investigations revealed that they had been severely burned. Among the dead were Arthur Dierckx and Max Nietzborn of the Great Dierckx Brothers, a strongman act, and Jennie Ward Todd of The Flying Wards. There were also 127 injuries.

=== Showmen's Rest ===
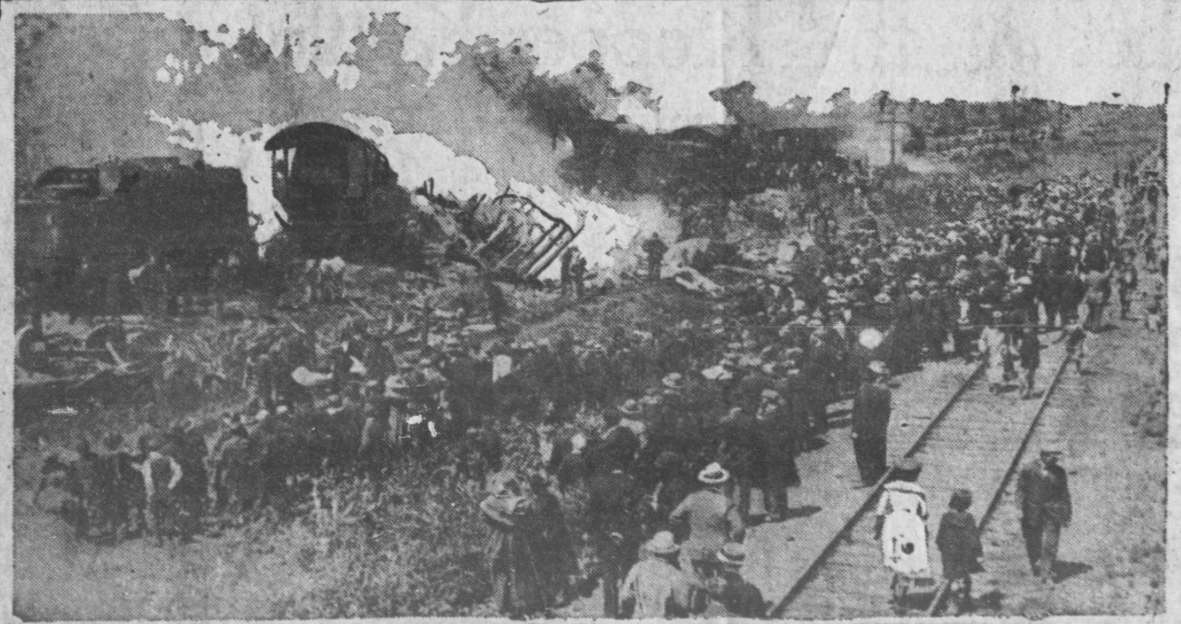
Onlookers surround the wrecked train

Five days later, fifty-three of those killed were buried in Woodlawn Cemetery, at the intersection of Cermak Road and Des Plaines Avenue in Forest Park, Illinois, in a section set aside as Showmen's Rest, which had been purchased by the Showmen's League of America only a few months earlier. The section is surrounded by statues of elephants in a symbolic mourning posture.

Only five of those buried had been formally identified, so the graves of most of the casualties are marked "Unknown Male" or "Unknown Female." One grave is marked "Smiley", one "Baldy", and another "4 Horse Driver". The more recent graves at the location belong to people who traveled with the circus and wanted to be buried there after they died.

== Investigation ==
The wreck is described in great detail in the report of the joint Interstate Commerce Commission (ICC) and Indiana Public Service Commission following an investigation.

Sargent, who was under arrest, refused to testify at any of the hearings on advice of his counsel. In his report of the accident to the officials of the railroad company, he made the following statement:

I was called shortly after 8 p.m. June 21, for deadhead equipment west, engine 8485, for 10.15 p.m., and left Kalamazoo, Michigan at 10.35 p.m. Had been up since 5 a.m., June 21, dead heading from my home in Jackson on Train No. 41, and had had little or no sleep during the day. Had had a couple of heavy meals before going out, realizing that I would not get anything more to eat until some time the next morning. Leaving Kalamazoo, followed freight train to Michigan City yard and stopped at signal near Center Street. Got proceed signal from some one on ground, pulled up to Michigan City, stopped at standpipe and took water. While following this freight train, we stopped first between Dowagiac and Pokagon on account signal at danger. Stopped again at Pokagon and Niles for same reason, this freight train being ahead.
Leaving Michigan City, had clear track to East Gary and there caught block of train ahead, reduced speed, but did not have to stop, as block cleared before I reached it. Reduced speed going through Gary to comply with rules, and saw no more signals at caution or danger until approaching curve east of Ivanhoe, where I found second signal east of wreck at caution. Was going about 25 miles per hour at this point, but did not reduce speed, as I expected that the next signal would probably clear before I got to it, or that I would see it, if at danger, in time to stop. The wind was blowing very hard into cab on my side and I closed the window, which made the inside of cab more comfortable. Before reaching the next signal I dozed on account of heat in cab and missed it. Not realizing what had happened to me until within 75 to 90 feet, I awoke suddenly and saw the tail or marker lights showing red on a train directly ahead of me. Not realizing that the rear end of this train was so close. I started to make a service application, but before completing it placed brake-valve handle into emergency position. We struck almost instantly after making the brake application. Don't know whether I closed the throttle or not, but think I did. Looked to see where the fireman was and saw he was running toward the gangway. Did not see a fusee, hear a torpedo, or see any other warning signal up to the time I saw the red tail lights. Wreck happened at about 4.05 a.m., June 22, and I stayed there for an hour or more assisting in getting people out of the wreckage. I have been in the service of the Michigan Central Railroad Co. for approximately 28 or 29 years, the last 16 of which I have been continuously employed as an engineer. I am in perfect physical condition, as well as mental condition, and have had no illness within 25 or 30 years requiring the service of a doctor. There was nothing defective about the air brakes or other mechanism of the engine or train that I was operating, nor was there any defective condition of any of the signals or track upon which I was operating to the best of my knowledge. The accident was due solely to the fact that I accidentally fell asleep, and I had no intent to injure any person, nor was same done with malice, but solely through an accident, as aforesaid.

The ICC report concluded, "This accident was caused by Engine-man Sargent being asleep, and from this cause, failing to observe the stop indication of automatic signal 2581, and the warnings of the flagman of the circus train, and to be governed by them." The report was also critical of the older wooden cars, whose oil lamps ignited the fire immediately after the collision.

Although Sargent and his fireman, Gustave Klauss, were criminally charged in Lake County, Indiana, following a trial the jury found itself deadlocked, and a mistrial was declared. Prosecutors declined to re-try the case, and charges were dismissed on June 9, 1920.

== Aftermath ==
The train wreck occurred on a Saturday, and its effects caused the Hagenbeck-Wallace Circus's show in Hammond and another in Monroe, Wisconsin, on June 24 to be canceled. However, the circus performed on June 25 in Beloit, Wisconsin, with other circuses providing some of the acts.

== See also ==
- Walter L. Main Circus train wreck
- List of circus accidents
