= Charles Sparks =

Charles Sparks may refer to:

- Charles I. Sparks (1872–1937), U.S. representative from Kansas
- Charles Sparks (circus owner) (1882–1949), American showman and circus proprietor
