= Charles Sparks (circus owner) =

American circus proprietor (1882-1949)

- Born: Charles McGee Sparks; 1882; Park City, Utah, U.S.
- Died: July 28, 1949 (aged 66–67); Hot Springs, Arkansas, U.S.
- Other name: Charlie Sparks
- Occupation: Circus proprietor

Charles Sparks (1882 – July 28, 1949) was an American showman and circus proprietor.

== Early life ==
Charles McGee Sparks, nicknamed Charlie, was born in 1882 in Park City, Utah, United States.

At just six, he turned to street-corner singing and dancing to support his widowed mother and two sisters. While staying at a Park City hotel, Charles and his mother met vaudeville performer John H. Weisman, who was struck by Charles's performing ability. Their friendship grew, and when his mother became seriously ill with tuberculosis, she entrusted Charles to Weisman's care. He was first given a job by the show owner, who eventually adopted him.

== Career ==
Charles Sparks first toured with John H. as minstrel performers before moving into the circus business. The pair appeared with the Walter L. Main Circus in 1886 and his wagon opera two years later.

He continued working with John H. Weisman, who organized his own circus in 1890. When John was killed by one of his lions during a performance in 1903, the circus came under the management of Charles, his "adopted brother." From 1903 to 1928, Charles Sparks served as general manager and superintendent of the Sparks Circus. He transformed the "three-car circus" into a thirty-car show, complete with everything needed for a circus, in a short time. Charles was aided in management by his foster brother, Clifton Robert Sparks. The show, then called the John H. Sparks World Famous Shows, retained that name until 1918, when it was shortened to Sparks World Famous Circus in 1919.

On September 13, 1916, Sparks faced a crisis in Kingsport, Tennessee, when his five-ton elephant and star attraction, Mary, killed one of the handlers. At first, Sparks pleaded for Mary's life, pointing to her extensive service with his show and spotless record prior to the incident. Pressured by townspeople demanding justice, he arranged Mary's public hanging with a railroad crane before 2,000 onlookers.

Charles Sparks launched his first Canadian tour with Sparks Famous Shows in 1919, ignoring warnings from veterans of the business. The gamble paid off, as the tour succeeded on all fronts and drew favorable comment.

Following the 1928 season, Charles Sparks sold his circus to Henry B. Gentry. Only afterward was it revealed that Gentry was an agent of the American Circus Corporation, a group Sparks had firmly opposed selling to. After selling his show, he grew restless during retirement. In the fall of 1929, plans were made with John Ringling North to take out a small circus, which was halted by the Wall Street crash of 1929.

Sparks returned to the business in 1930 by buying the motorized Downie Bros. Circus from Andrew Downie. In his role as manager, he enhanced the show with prominent circus acts and brought back the beloved street parade. When his wife Addie died, he ceased managing the circus in 1938, and it closed permanently in 1939.

He was recruited by Robert Edward Ringling in 1943 to manage "Spangles," the Ringling Brothers' traveling circus. For several months, he served as manager of the Spangles show while it performed at Madison Square Garden in New York City.

He took on a short-term advisor role with Zack Terrell, then the owner of Cole Bros. Circus, in 1948, but became ill following weeks in Louisville, which prompted his resignation and his return to Macon, Georgia.

== Personal life ==
Charles Sparks married Adelaide "Ada" V. Mitchell on April 4, 1898. She functioned as the circus's primary cook and provided veterinary care for the animals.

He based his early home and the circus's winter quarters in Salisbury, North Carolina. Sparks later chose Macon, Georgia, for winter quarters around 1920 and lived at the Hotel Dempsey for 29 years. During his time in Macon, he balanced civic engagement with charitable activities, holding a position as a bank director and participating in the Shrine as well as multiple showmen's clubs.

== Death ==
Charles Sparks died on July 28, 1949, in Hot Springs, Arkansas, United States, at age 67.

When the news of his death reached Macon, Mayor Lewis Burgess Wilson proclaimed an hour of mourning in tribute to the showman. His funeral service was held in Macon, Georgia.

== Legacy ==
Charles Sparks was noted for operating his circus with integrity, rejecting the deceptive practices and money-grabbing games that characterized many other shows.
