= Downie Bros. Circus =

Former American circus

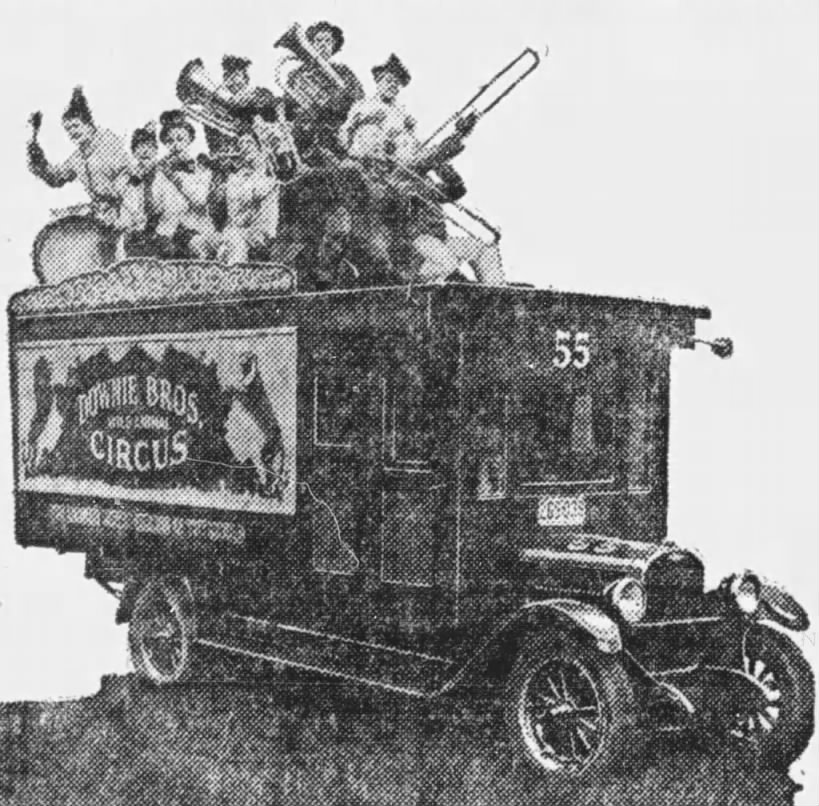

Origin
- Country: United States
- Founder(s): Andrew Downie
- Year founded: 1926

Information
- Winter quarters: Havre de Grace, Maryland

Downie Bros. Circus was an American circus established in 1926 and operated by Andrew Downie.

== History ==
While in winter quarters in Havre de Grace, Maryland, Andrew Downie, former proprietor of the Walter L. Main Circus, was preparing in February 1926 to start the Downie Bros. Wild Animal Circus.

During his 40 years in the circus, Downie employed nearly every type of transport, including horse and wagon, canal barges, steam tractors with trailers, and the railroad circus train. Modernizing operations, he scrapped wooden railroad cars and adopted motor vehicle transport. By loading wagons and equipment onto trucks, the circus could travel widely and reach communities the railroad shows could not. Downie planned a 45-vehicle motor circus of house cars, baggage and livestock trucks, animal dens, and trailers, aimed at towns with paved roads. From Havre de Grace, he organized equipment, stock, and personnel for an April opening, and paused in York County to secure ring stock. Clarence Auskings moved from his position as contracting agent for the Gentry Bros. Circus to become general agent of the new circus.

The 1926 season began under the title, the "Downie Bros. Motorized Show," commonly shortened to the "Downie Bros. Circus." It launched with a single-ring circus on fifteen trucks, later expanding the Downie Bros. Circus to two rings and thirty trucks before the year closed.

By May 1926, the circus had included fifty acts: the Aerial Cowdens, society gymnasts; the Five De Hománs, acrobats; Steve Oris, Montana cowboy and bullwhip artist; the Mansfields, sharpshooters; the Silverlake Trio, aerialists; Capt. Francis Terps with ponies, dogs, and monkeys; Madame Barnard's monkeys; and Teddy, the famous New York Hippodrome elephant, now fully trained to drink from a bottle, sit on a large chair, and dance the Charleston under R. W. McKay.

The circus staged two daily performances under a large waterproof canvas illuminated by electric lights.

During the 1927 season, the amusement enterprise was transported by 68 motor trucks, with each circus performer traveling in a private living truck or house car. The circus program offered Gene and Mary Enos on a 35-foot pole, Harry and Charlotte Levine as head and hand balancers, the Conner Trio on a revolving comedy ladder, the upside-down Barrows, Taylor, and Moore as aerialists, William Grant, frog contortionist, Smilie Daly falling from five tables, and the John Walters Trio on Roman rings. Animal acts included elephants, monkeys, Capt. Bob Johnson's fighting African lions, a mixed animal group, and Carl Clark's trained Florida razorback hogs.

The show advertised itself with a mile-long free street parade known as "A Mile of Motor Trucks." Beyond its circus appeal, it doubled as an auto show for the long line of trucks and cars. Five bands and two calliopes were part of the parade. The parade was entirely motorized, the sole horses being those trained for the ring acts. The Downie Bros.' herd of elephants was carried in several big Mack Trucks.

In October 1928, the circus returned to its pre-war pricing, charging 25 cents for the 2 pm matinee and 50 cents for the 8 pm evening show. This achievement was made possible by the circus's modern, economical transportation: motor trucks. Downie Bros. abandoned their costly circus train which allowed them to offer even higher-quality performances at lower prices than before. By then, the Downie Bros. Circus was a three-ring production moving on seventy-five trucks, with its animal dens and decorated caravans mounted on truck chassis and featured in the daily parade. Downie Bros. Circus, the largest of about fifteen motorized circuses in the world, traveled entirely by Chevrolet utility trucks.

In 1929, the three-ring circus had a steel arena and an elevated stage.

It later became the Charles Sparks' Downie Bros. Circus. In February 1929, Andrew Downie transferred ownership of all equipment, including land, buildings, trucks, cars, and animals, to Charles Sparks of Macon, Georgia, reportedly for $450,000. Two weeks after selling it, Downie repurchased the entire circus in March 1929, with plans to keep running the show. Midway through the 1930 season, Charles Sparks acquired the Downie Bros. Circus from Andrew Downie again and managed it until 1938.

The last show under the title folded around 1944.

== Notable performers ==
- Capt. Bob Johnson, animal trainer
- Carl Clark, animal trainer
- William Grant, the human frog, premier contortionist
- Rojas Duo, comedy jugglers
- John Walters Trio, Roman ring artists
- The Conner Trio, wire walkers
- Harry and Charlotte Levine, head and hand balancers
- Gene and Mary Enos, perch pole performers
- Harry Martinez Trio
- Olga Reonhart, elephant trainer
- Frank W. Creamer, leopard trainer
- Mayme Butters, tightrope artist

== Alternate names ==
- Downie Bros. Wild Animal Circus
- Downie Bros. Motorized Show
- Downie Bros. World's Best Shows
- Downie Bros. Big 3-Ring Circus

== See also ==
- List of circuses and circus owners
