= Showmen's Rest =

Circus people's graveyard

Coordinates: 41°51′2.1″N 87°49′10.0″W

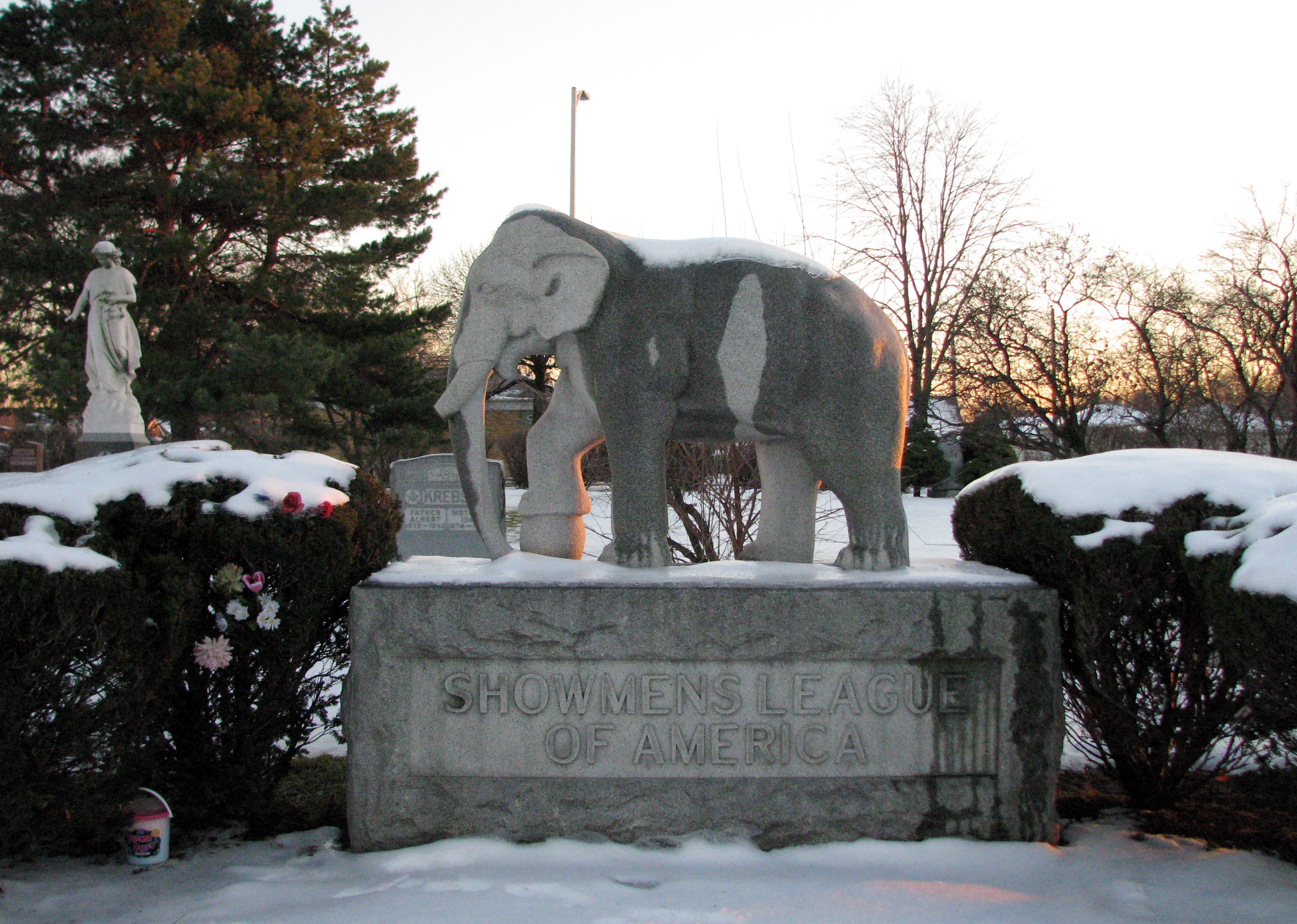
One of the five elephants surrounding Showmen's Rest.

Showmen's Rest in Forest Park, Illinois, is a 750-plot section of Woodlawn Cemetery mostly for circus performers owned by the Showmen's League of America.

== Showmen's Rest founding and the Hammond circus train wreck of 1918 ==
The Showmen's League of America, formed in 1913 with Buffalo Bill Cody as its first president, had recently selected and purchased the burial ground for its members in Woodlawn Cemetery, at the intersection of Cermak Road and Des Plaines Avenue in Forest Park, Illinois.

The first performers and show workers buried in Showmen's Rest were between 56 and 61 employees of the Hagenbeck-Wallace Circus who had died in a train wreck on June 22, 1918, in Hessville, Indiana, (about 5 1/2 miles east of Hammond, Indiana). As many as 86 people were killed early that morning when an empty Michigan Central Railroad troop train traveling from Detroit, Michigan, to Chicago, Illinois, plowed into Hagenbeck-Wallace's circus train after the troop train's engineer, Alonzo Sargent, had fallen asleep. Among the dead were Arthur Dierckx and Max Nietzborn of the "Great Dierckx Brothers" strong man act and Jennie Ward Todd of "The Flying Wards." Services for the victims buried at Showmen's Rest were held five days after the train wreck.

A historical marker at the center of Showmen's Rest at Woodlawn Cemetery honors the 86 people who died in the crash. Statues of four elephants, inscribed with "Showmen's Rest," form the corners of the Showmen's Rest plot; a fifth, larger elephant statue is at the center, with the words "Showmen's League of America" inscribed on it. Each statue is an elephant with its foot raised with a ball underneath and the trunks lowered. (Raised trunks are a symbol of joy and excitement; lowered trunks symbolize mourning.)

The Showmen's Rest section of Woodlawn Cemetery is still used for burials of deceased showmen who are said to be performing now at the biggest of the Big Tops. A Memorial Day service is held at Woodlawn Cemetery every year. Some nearby residents say the sounds of ghostly elephants can be heard at night. One possible explanation for the sounds is nearby Brookfield Zoo, which housed elephants until September 2010.

== Other Showmen's Rests ==
A few other Showmen's Rests can be found, including one at Mount Olivet Cemetery, in Hugo, Oklahoma, where a winter circus home calls itself Circus City, USA. In Miami, Florida, the largest Showmen's Rest is at Southern Memorial Park, where large elephant and lion statues flank hundreds of markers commemorating circus greats and not-so-greats. Tampa, Florida's Showmen's Rest is located close to the Greater Tampa Showmen's Association near downtown.

== In popular culture ==
Location used in an episode of NBC's Chicago Fire (Ep. Dead of Winter, 2021). A grave-keeper's arm is pinned under a fallen gravestone.

The middle grade novel, It Found Us by Lindsay Currie, was inspired by research the author did on the Hagenbeck-Wallace train wreck. The author encourages readers to visit the Showmen's League of America website as well as the donation page to help support the upkeep of this beautiful memorial.

== See also ==
- List of United States cemeteries
- Hammond circus train wreck
