= Gentry Bros. Circus =

Former American circus

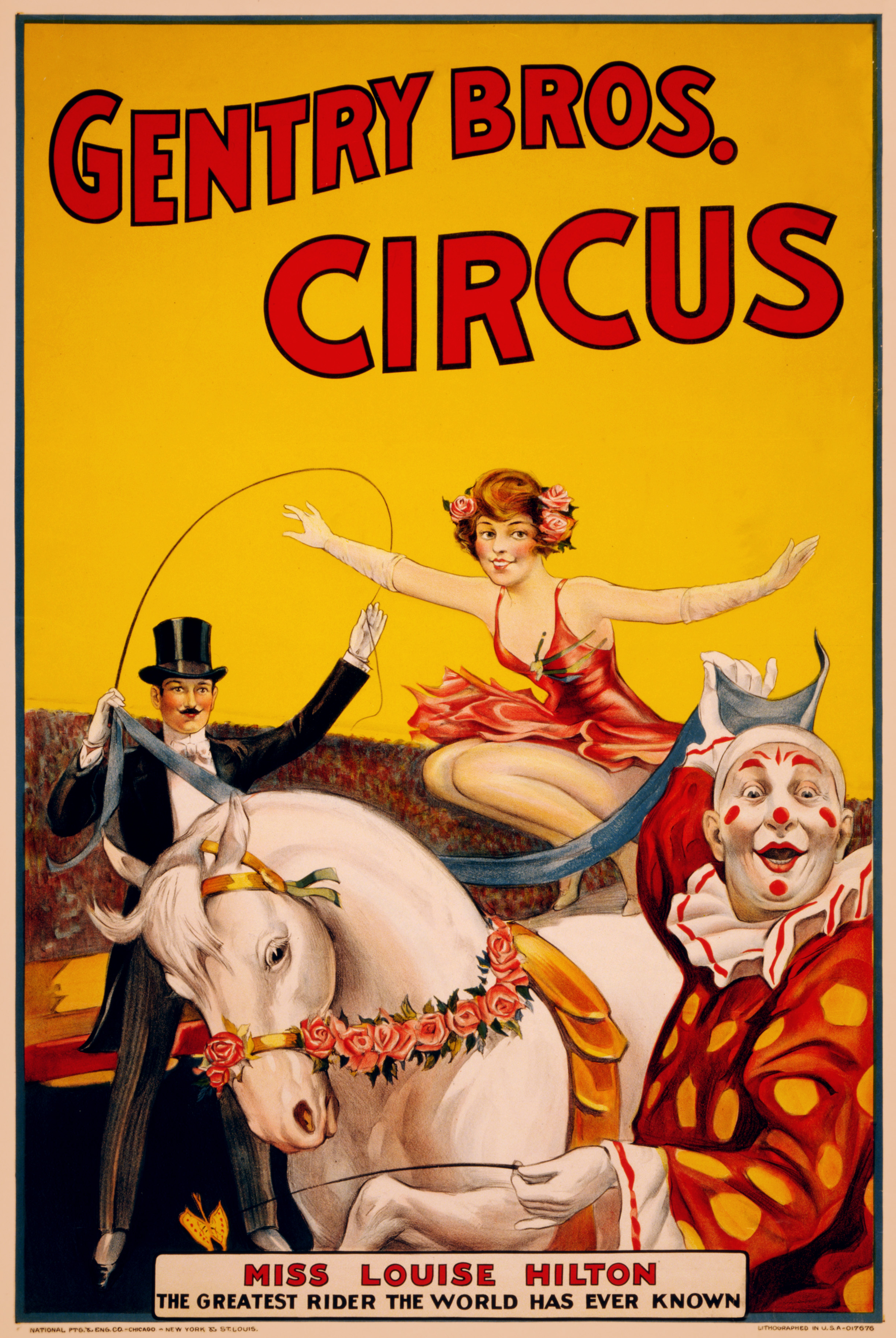

Origin
- Country: United States
- Founder(s): Henry B. Gentry, Wallace Gentry, James William "Will" Gentry, and Frank H. Gentry
- Year founded: 1885

Information
- Operator(s): Henry B. Gentry
- Fate: Crash of 1929

The Gentry Bros. Circus was an American circus that began as a small dog and pony show and later toured the United States and Canada, becoming at one point America's largest traveling circus.

== History ==
The Gentry Bros. Circus was established in 1885 after 17-year-old Henry B. Gentry, building on his apprenticeship under "Prof. Morris," recruited his brothers Wallace, James William "Will," and Frank to join his dog-and-pony act.

Their early seasons featured only twenty dogs and matinee shows indoors, but by 1889 they had gained success in local theaters. In 1891, they advanced to tent shows, beginning in East St. Louis, Illinois, with a two-car company.

The Gentry brothers were thriving by 1894, when Taylor Coons and W. O. Tarkington joined as a second unit was organized. Among their new animal features, the Gentry brothers introduced performing house cats, regarded as one of the hardest acts to train. Both Gentry shows launched from New Orleans in 1895, and the no. 2 show made a western tour.

During the ensuing years, the Gentrys faced rival circuses in the same towns and overcame them by acquiring the competing shows. In 1898, the brothers purchased George Sipe's show, forming a third unit with Coons in charge and Tarkington as general agent. They also bought Harry K. Main and Tom Ogden's show the same year, making four nearly identical units, each composed of four cars, with Coons managing the new no. 3 show. The two new attractions were put out in 1899.

In 1901, the circus had added flat cars, soon followed by billposters, advance cars, and parade wagons. The Gentrys purchased 20 baby elephants, later reduced to four per unit after losses.

The Gentry Bros. Circus had, by 1902, expanded to four units under the management of separate Gentry brothers. The four circuses covered the U.S. and extended into Canada and Mexico, carrying 72 cars and a collection of 22 elephants, 12 camels, 150 monkeys, 12 sacred cattle, and 50 horses.

When Coons left for hotel work, Tarkington took charge of the no. 3 unit in 1902, equipped with five flats, one sleeper, and two stock cars. Though an outsider among the Gentry-run units, he thrived for three seasons and once out-grossed them all. On July 4, 1902, in Grand Island, Nebraska, a cyclone tore through a packed tent, injuring many and killing a child. The show retreated to Sioux City for repairs, while Tarkington handed the day's proceeds to the mayor for relief.

That year, the company lost many of its top performers to the Ringling Brothers Circus, who lured acts away with higher salaries, a common practice in the circus industry. As a result, the show, which had operated four small railroad circuses, claimed it could field only three troupes the following year.

The Gentry Bros. Circus had earned a reputation in 1910 as the largest traveling circus in the United States.

The Gentry Bros. Circus changed hands around 1916, reportedly fetching $100,000. The new owners, who, recognizing the value of the brothers' reputation, kept the Gentry name. Ownership of the Gentry Bros. Circus changed several other times, with the circus remaining active until 1929. For a period, the circus was managed and owned by Ben Austin alongside the late J. D. Newman. In 1929, Floyd and Howard King owned the Gentry Bros. Circus, overseeing preparations for the upcoming circus season.

After the Wall Street crash of 1929, the Gentry Bros. Circus train was forced to shut down.

Henry B. Gentry, alongside Frank H. Gentry, revived the Gentry Bros. Circus in 1931, touring as Gentry Bros. Famous Shows and the Original Gentry Bros. Circus until 1934.

An original steam calliope that performed in the Gentry Bros. Circus is currently part of the Henry Ford Museum collection in Dearborn, Michigan.

== Alternate names ==
- Gentry's Equine and Canine Paradox
- Gentry Brothers Dog and Pony Show
- Gentry Bros. Circus
- Gentry Bros. Famous Shows

== Members ==
- Louise Hilton
- Orrin Hollis
- George Myers (1914-1916)

== See also ==
- List of circuses and circus owners
- Henry B. Gentry
