= Cermak Road =

Thoroughfare in Chicago, Illinois, US

Cermak Road (22nd Street)
- Anton Cermak Memorial Parkway; 2200 South
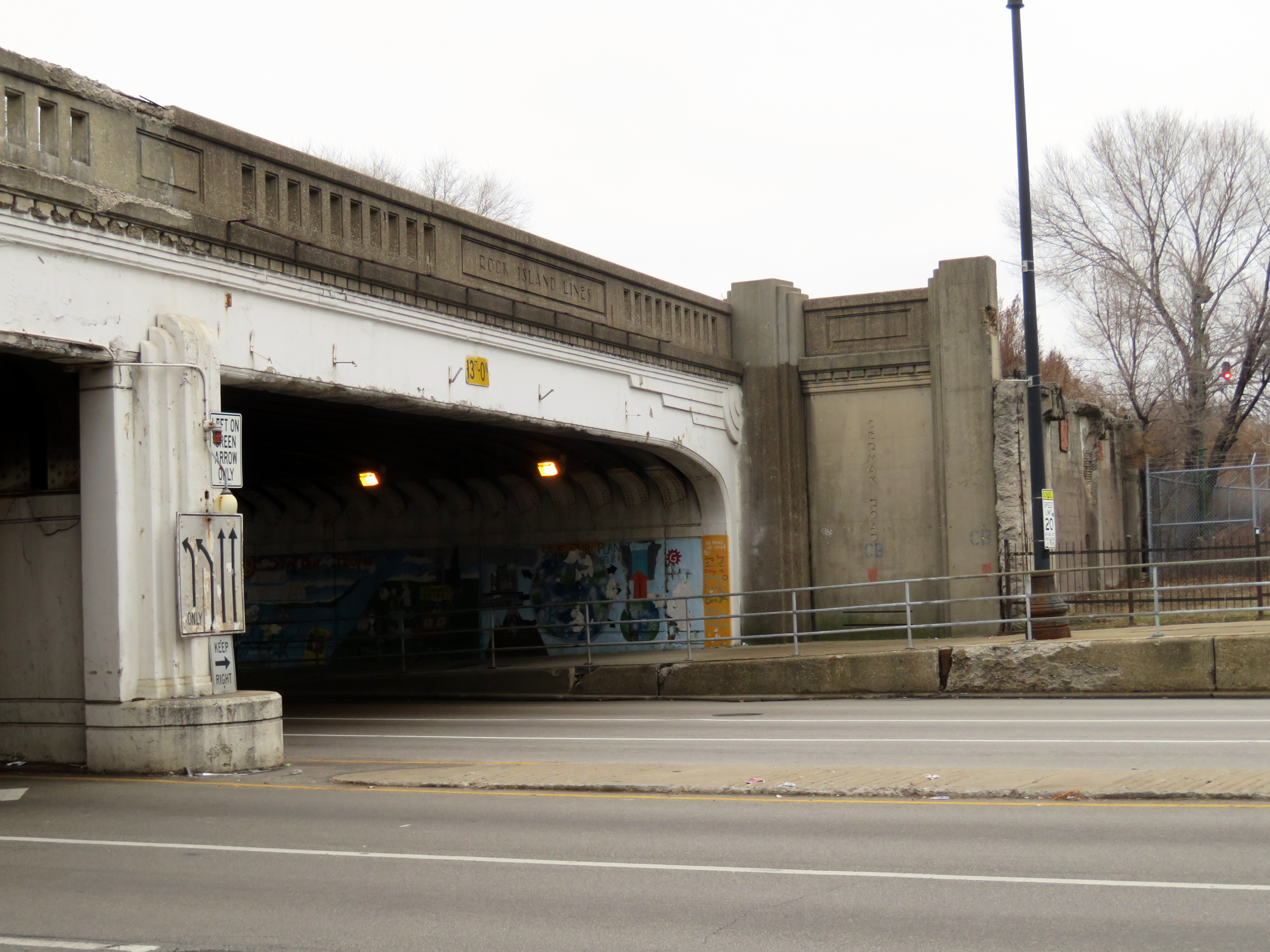
- Cermak Road crossing under the Rock Island District in Chinatown.
- West end: Blanchard Street in Wheaton, Illinois
- East end: Martin Luther King Drive in Chicago

Other
- Known for: Anton Cermak

Cermak Road, also known as 22nd Street, is a 19-mile, major east–west street on Chicago's near south and west sides and the city's western suburbs. In Chicago's street numbering system, Cermak is 2200 south, or twenty-two blocks south of the baseline of Madison Street. Normally, one mile comprises eight Chicago blocks, but the arterial streets Roosevelt Road, formerly named Twelfth Street and at 1200 South, and Cermak Road (Twenty-Second Street) were platted before the eight-blocks-per-mile plan was implemented. Roosevelt Road is one mile south of Madison Avenue and there are twelve blocks within that mile. Cermak Road is two miles south of Madison Avenue and there are ten blocks within the mile between Roosevelt and Cermak Roads.

On March 15, 1933, the street was renamed after Democratic politician Anton Cermak, Mayor of Chicago from 1931 until 1933. Cermak was shot and killed on February 15, 1933, by an assassin who was aiming for President-elect Franklin Roosevelt. Cermak was a Czech immigrant credited with creating a diverse Democratic political coalition that included formerly Republican African Americans. The street was chosen to honor Cermak because it passes through the neighborhoods of Pilsen and Lawndale, both at the time heavily Czech-American. The adjoining suburbs of Cicero and Berwyn were also home to a large Czech population during the first half of the 20th century.

== Route description ==
A trip from east to west along Cermak Road traces a historical timeline of the Chicago area, from Yankee industrialists' masonry mansions in the Prairie District on the lakeshore, to mammoth printing presses and manufactories banking the Chicago River and Sanitary Canal, past immigrants' crowded brick housing, schools and churches, along boulevards of temporary middle class success and massive plants that produced twentieth century equipment for the nation, through commercial districts made up of shops and savings banks that boomed in the 1920s. Further west, a river and forests curtained off the farmland that was eventually developed into asphalt-encircled shopping malls or steel-framed, glass-walled corporate towers. Transportation evolved from waterborne lake and river vessels to steam powered railroads reaching across the continent and electrified urban systems connecting neighborhoods and towns to super highways overlaying all of the predecessors.

=== South Loop ===
Cermak Road's practical eastern end is Martin Luther King Drive at McCormick Place, a huge exposition center that straddles Lake Shore Drive, in the Near South Side, Chicago community area. King Drive curves west and feeds into Cermak with a lane continuing north into one-way Calumet Avenue.

The building at 350 E. Cermak, formerly the Lakeside Press and the headquarters of R.R. Donnelly, is an official landmark. On the northwest corner of Calumet Avenue is another landmark, the American Book Company Building built in 1912 at 320–330 E. Cermak.

At the southeast corner of Michigan Avenue once sat Prohibition-era mobster Al Capone's headquarters from 1928 until 1932, the Lexington Hotel, which was built in 1892, vacated in 1980, and demolished in 1995.

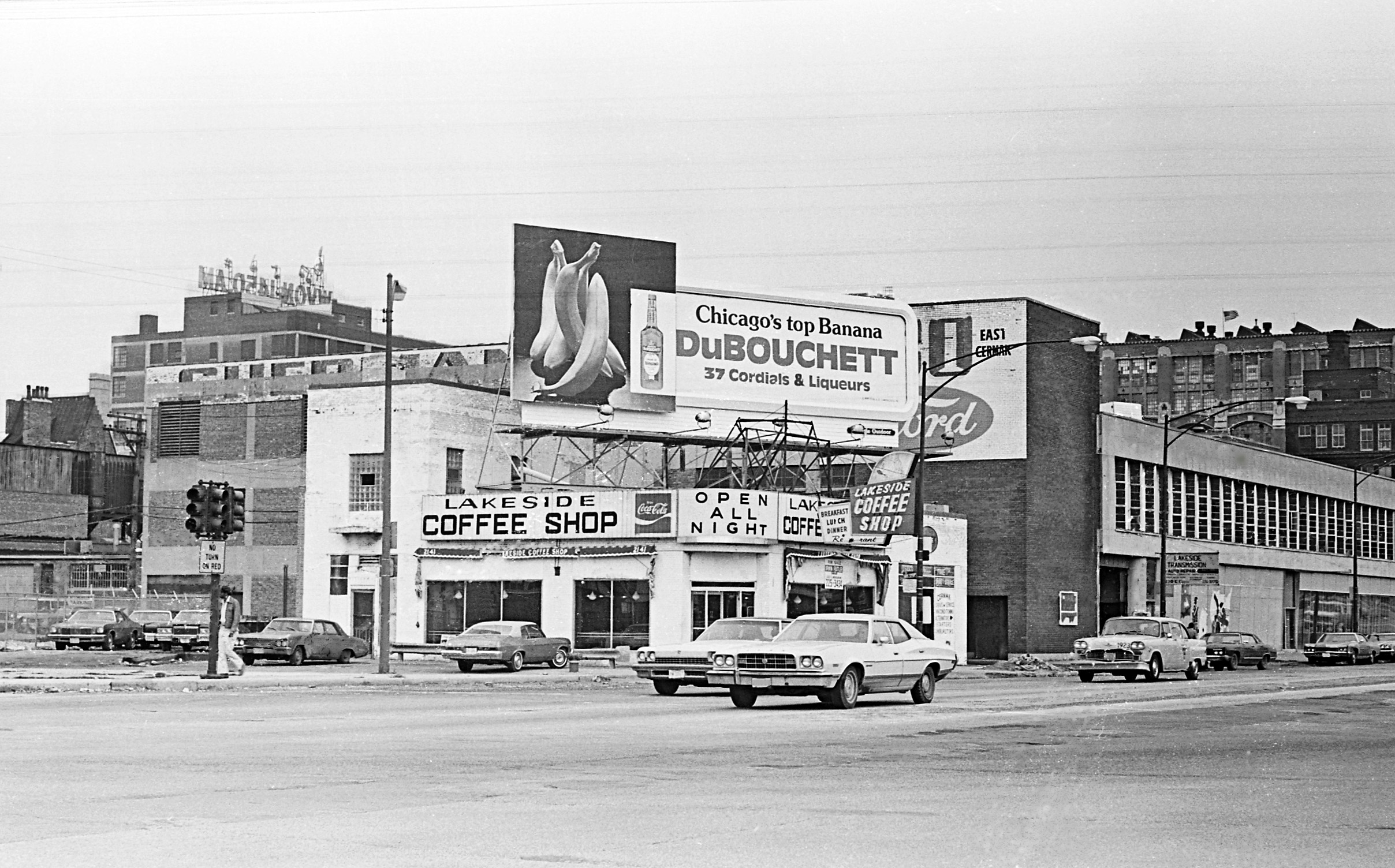
March 1979 photo looking northeast across Cermak Road from the southwest corner of Indiana and Cermak.

Michigan Avenue to the north and south is designated the Motor Row District, which commemorates the earliest days of automobile retail showrooms. At the southeast corner of Wabash Avenue is a restored 1930s fast-food pioneer, White Castle #16. The official landmark is located diagonally opposite to a modern working White Castle. The Chicago Transit Authority Green Line, the "alley el" runs above the alley between Wabash and State, with Roosevelt Road and 35th Street being the nearest stations since the Cermak stop was removed in 1978. In 2011, plans were announced to build a new $50 million Cermak Station.

Hilliard Towers Apartments, former public housing units designed in the mid-1960s by Bertrand Goldberg, are at State Street. On the opposite side, from State to Federal Streets, the Chicago Housing Authority's Harold L. Ickes Homes' eleven structures provided subsidized housing from 1955 until 2010. The National Teachers Elementary Academy, a public school at 55 W. Cermak, was subsequently built on the site.

=== Chinatown ===
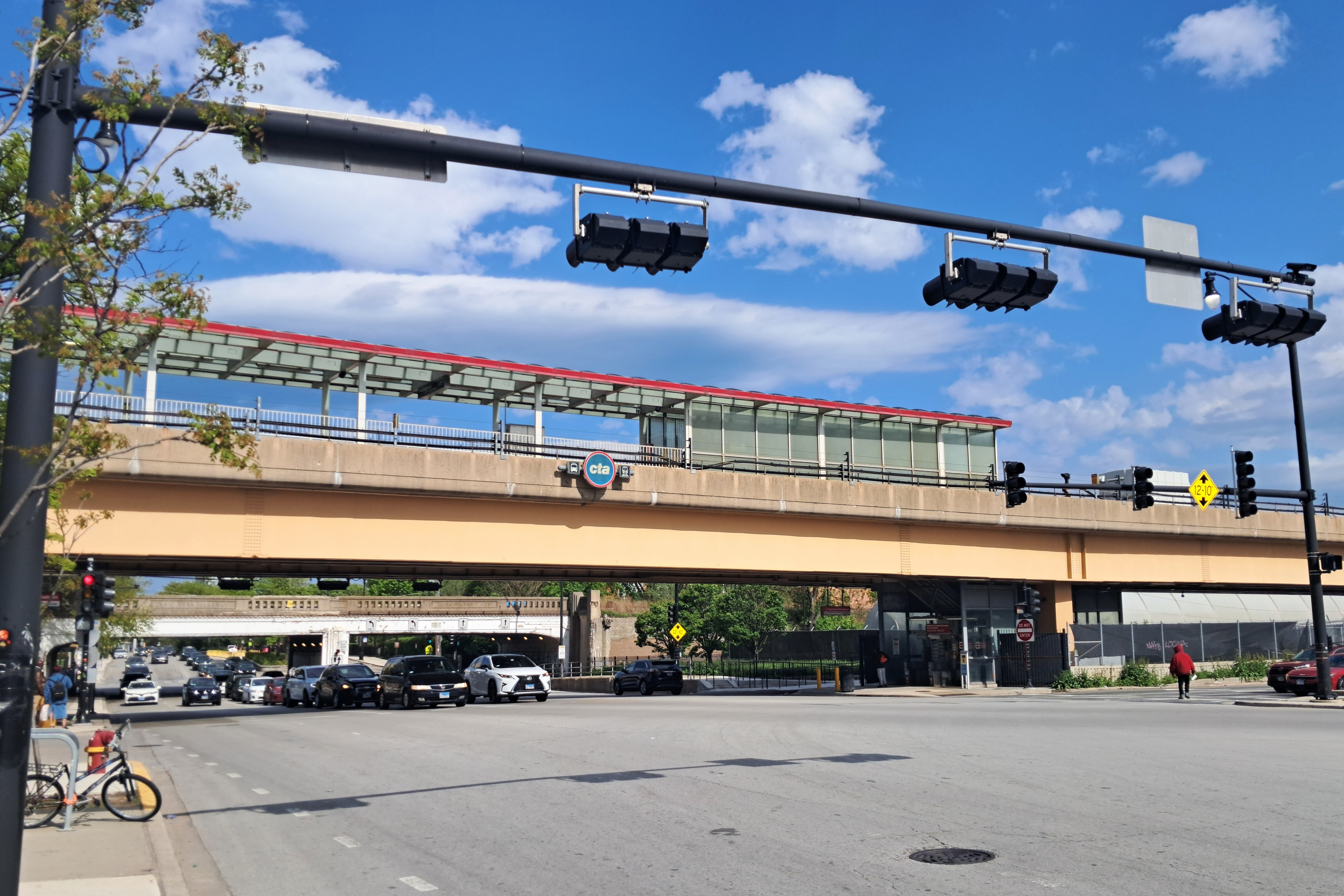
Cermak Road at Cermak–Chinatown station and the Chinatown feeder ramp

Cermak Road now cuts through the north end of the community area Armour Square, heads west under Metra and CTA's Red Line, meets four exit lanes and two entrance lanes of the Dan Ryan and Adlai Stevenson Expressway Expressways, and then intersects with Chinatown's main commercial strip, Wentworth Avenue. The historic On Leong Merchants Association Building and the ornamental Chinatown Gate are at the southwest corner. At 212 W. Cermak is a fire station, home of ALS Engine 8, BLS Truck 4, BLS Ambulance 85, and Battalion Chief 2.

Archer Courts Apartments, 2242 S. Princeton, is a 147 unit subsidized rental building built in 1951 by the CHA and placed into a TIF in the late 1990s. The affordable rent apartment building was rehabilitated and is still owned by a non-profit entity, the Chicago Community Development Corporation. Cermak Road, a newer axis of Chinatown, obliquely crosses the west-southwest angular artery Archer Avenue, dips to pass through a long chute underneath a viaduct beneath the Midway Airport Orange Line and another rail line just east of Canal Street and enters into a Chicago landmark area designated the Cermak Bridge District, part of the Lower West Side.

=== Industrial Zone - Pilsen ===
The road traverses a Scherzer rolling lift type bridge over the south branch of the Chicago River, past old factories, a cement plant and the Carpenter Training Center, and then under the Dan Ryan Expressway (Interstates 90 and 94) to Halsted Street into the Pilsen neighborhood, named for a city in the present-day Czech Republic.

A quarter-mile west of Halsted Street (800 West) is the historic Fisk Generating Station from Carpenter to Loomis, and from Cermak south to the Chicago river. At the southwest corner of Throop Street (1300W) stands a red brick structure topped with a radio antennae-equipped gothic tower that formerly housed Commonwealth Edison garages and warehouses, then Warshawsky & Sons JC Whitney automobile parts supplier, and most recently subdivided warehouse spaces and indoor futbol (soccer) fields. On the other side of the street, at May Street, is Dvorak Park. Cermak is an industrial corridor up to the Benito Juarez Community Academy where southwest–northeast Blue Island Avenue diagonally crosses Ashland Avenue (1600 West) and Cermak Road. That stretch was of the street was upgraded using environmentally sustainable methods and materials in 2011. The Loomis Avenue (1400W) bridge connects Pilsen to Bridgeport. The Chicago Transit Authority's elevated Pink Line turns west at Paulina Street (1700 West), and runs parallel two blocks north of Cermak for about five miles to the town of Cicero.

At the intersection of Cermak and Paulina once stood the main factory of the Chicago Cottage Organ Company. The largest reed organ factory in the world, it produced thousands of pump organs per year in the decades before and after 1900.

=== Heart of the City ===
West of Ashland Avenue (1600 West), Cermak narrows to a lane in each direction. Parking lanes, sidewalks, and multi-unit storefront buildings abutting the sidewalks border the street. This commercial district contains restaurants, laundries, taverns, banks, clothing, and groceries. On the east side of Wolcott is the Cristo Rey Jesuit High School which took over the site from St. Stephen's Church, a Slovene parish founded in 1898. Southward on Hoyne (2100 West) is where the twin steeples of St. Paul Roman Catholic Church rise up from the church founded on 22nd Place by German immigrants in 1876. This area is known as the Heart of Chicago. At the northwest corner of Oakley is the public Josiah Pickard Elementary School, named for the Superintendent of Chicago Schools from 1864 to 1877.

=== Little Village ===
West of Chicago's longest street, Western Avenue (2400 West), is the Little Village neighborhood. The railroad at 2500 West marks the eastern border of community area South Lawndale. Commercial storefronts with apartments above continue to line both sides of the busy street. On the corner of Whipple (3030 West) is Our Lady of Tepeyac Catholic Church, which was built in 1919 as St. Casimir Catholic Church, a Polish immigrant parish. At the corner of Cermak Road and Marshall Boulevard is the famous Apollo 2000 Theater. Commonwealth Edison Troy Street Substation sits along the alley to the north and its namesake street.

=== North Lawndale ===
Cermak Road doglegs to the north as it passes under a railroad viaduct near Trumbull. The Metra Burlington Northern rail line serves as the north boundary of the Little Village neighborhood as it heads southwest to its terminus in Aurora, Illinois. West of the rail line and up to Ogden Avenue, the border between North and South Lawndale is Cermak Road. The street widens in North Lawndale and is banked by more residential structures, mainly brick two and three flats and corner storefronts in multi-unit buildings. Nearly two blocks south at 2348 S. Millard Avenue is Anton Cermak's home at the time of his death, registered as a historic place in 2011. After crossing Ogden Avenue and Pulaski Road and entering the neighborhood nicknamed K-Town, the westbound and eastbound lanes are divided by a grassy parkway median, causing Cermak to resemble a boulevard before meeting Chicago's western city limits at the Belt Railway viaduct at 4600 West. The CTA Pink Line, having descended from an elevated structure over Keeler Avenue to street level at Kildare Avenue, then makes a pair of southward offset bends between Kostner and Kilbourn Avenues, placing the tracks only a half block north of Cermak. The Pink Line, formerly the Douglas branch of the Blue Line, heads west from there to its last stop, the 54th/Cermak terminal in Cicero, Illinois.

=== Town of Cicero ===
From the railroad to the southeast corner of Cermak and Cicero Avenue (Illinois Route 50) was the site, from 1905 until 1983, of the Western Electric Company's famous Hawthorne Works, which at one time employed 45,000 workers. Notorious criminal Al Capone's 1924 Cicero headquarters were located at the Hawthorne Inn, 4833 W. 22nd Street. Cermak Road expands west of Cicero Avenue and provides parking lanes on either side as it passes the three miles through the towns of Cicero and Berwyn, to Harlem Avenue and then on to suburbs to the west. At the northwest corner with Laramie Avenue (5200W) is a Commonwealth Edison Substation building and yard which also houses Chicago Transit Authority electrical equipment. The Olympic Theater, built in 1927, still stands at 6134 W. Cermak Rd.

=== City of Berwyn ===
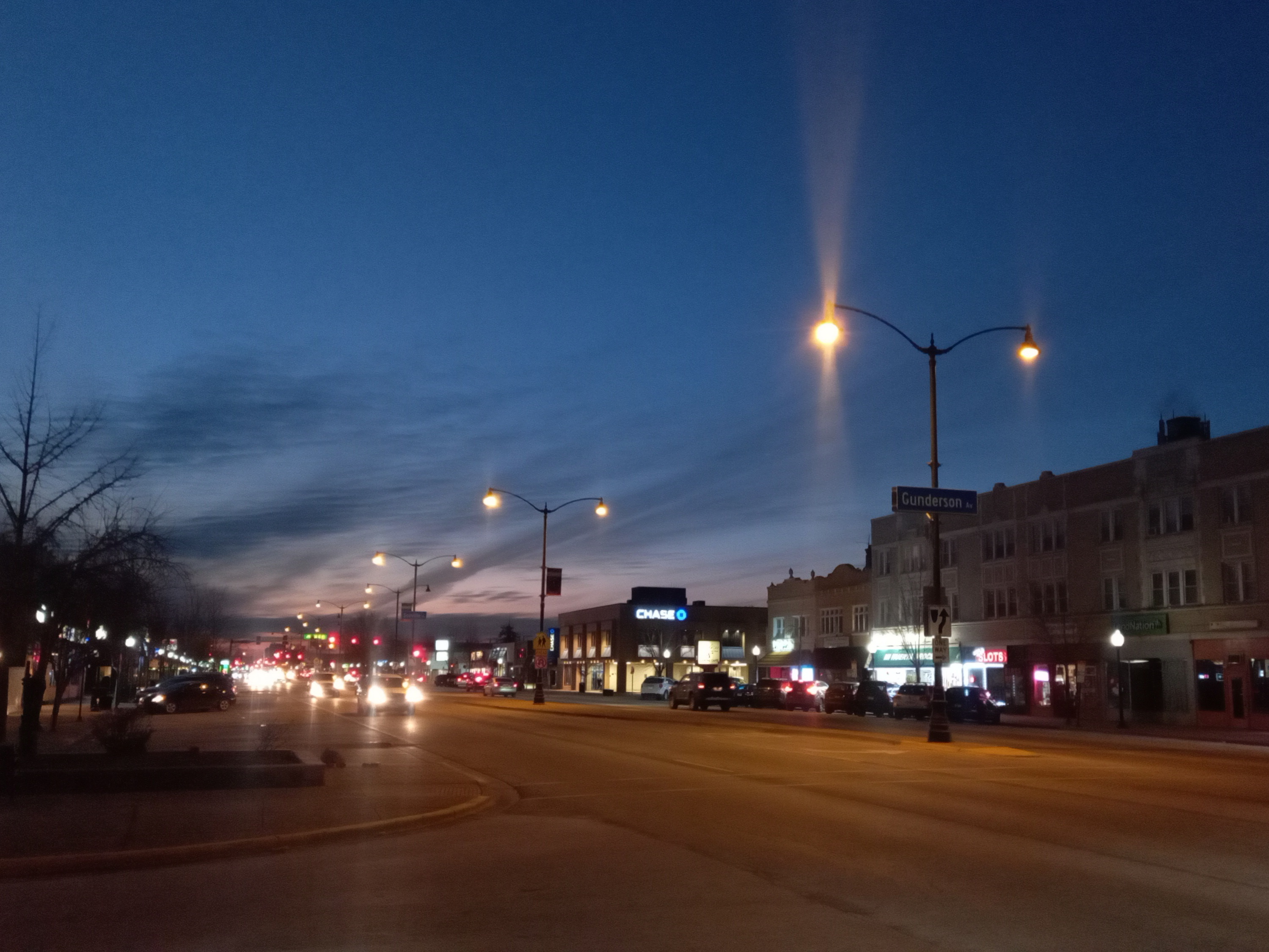
Cermak Road at Gunderson Avenue in Berwyn, taken at night

Lombard Avenue (6200 West) is the western boundary. Little differentiates the two municipalities; no landmarks announce the invisible border, and the street layout and building styles do not change. The U.S. Postal Service has a large facility at 6625 West Cermak in the 60402 zip code. At Wesley (6700 West), Riverside Drive angles off to the southwest towards the eponymous suburb designed by Frederick Law Olmsted. The road's width decreases here, at the western end of the grass and tree lined median and diagonal parking spaces, to two traffic lanes, a parallel parking lane, wide sidewalk and abutting storefront buildings on either side. At the southwest corner of Oak Park Avenue (6800 West) is the restored American State Bank building, built in 1925 and now home to the Big Hurt Brewhouse restaurant. At the southeast corner of Harlem Avenue (Illinois Route 43), is the Cermak Plaza, an early shopping center which opened in 1956. The noted Spindle sculpture, a tall spike impaling eight cars, decorated the parking lot until its May 2, 2008 dismantlement.

=== West suburbs ===
West of Harlem Avenue, Cermak Road is the boundary between Forest Park, IL to the north and North Riverside, IL to the south, location of the North Riverside Park Mall. Woodlawn Memorial Park, one of Forest Park's many cemeteries, occupies the road's northern edge up to Des Plaines Avenue. The Showmen's League of America maintains a final resting place for deceased outdoor show workers called the Showman's Rest. A connected crematorium, columbarium and mausoleum occupy a narrow strip on the west side of Des Plaines Avenue. Just west of the mortuary, Forest Preserve District of Cook County (FPDCC) picnic groves lie on both sides of the road. The Des Plaines River flows southward beneath a concrete bridge. The First Avenue cutoff allows westerly traffic to avoid the Chicago Central & Pacific R.R. diagonal grade crossing and turn right to head north on First Avenue (Illinois Route 171). FPDCC Miller Meadow lies north of the cutoff and extends one mile to Roosevelt Road. Checkerboard Airfield, a U.S. Air Mail facility, was located here from 1919 to 1927. Hobbyists can now fly radio controlled models from a designated landing field. The Riverside Golf Club, established in 1893, straddles the river and occupies the southeast corner of Cermak and First.

The road continues on as Cermak until the border of Westchester, Illinois and Oak Brook, Illinois, at which time it is then called 22nd Street. 22nd Street ends at the junction of Illinois Route 56 (also called Butterfield Road) in Oak Brook.

Three Smaller, unconnected portions of 22nd Street continue through Lombard, Glen Ellyn, and Wheaton. The final portion of this road ends at Blanchard Street in Wheaton. The segment bordering College of DuPage was renamed Fawell Boulevard in honor of Harris Fawell.

== Transportation ==
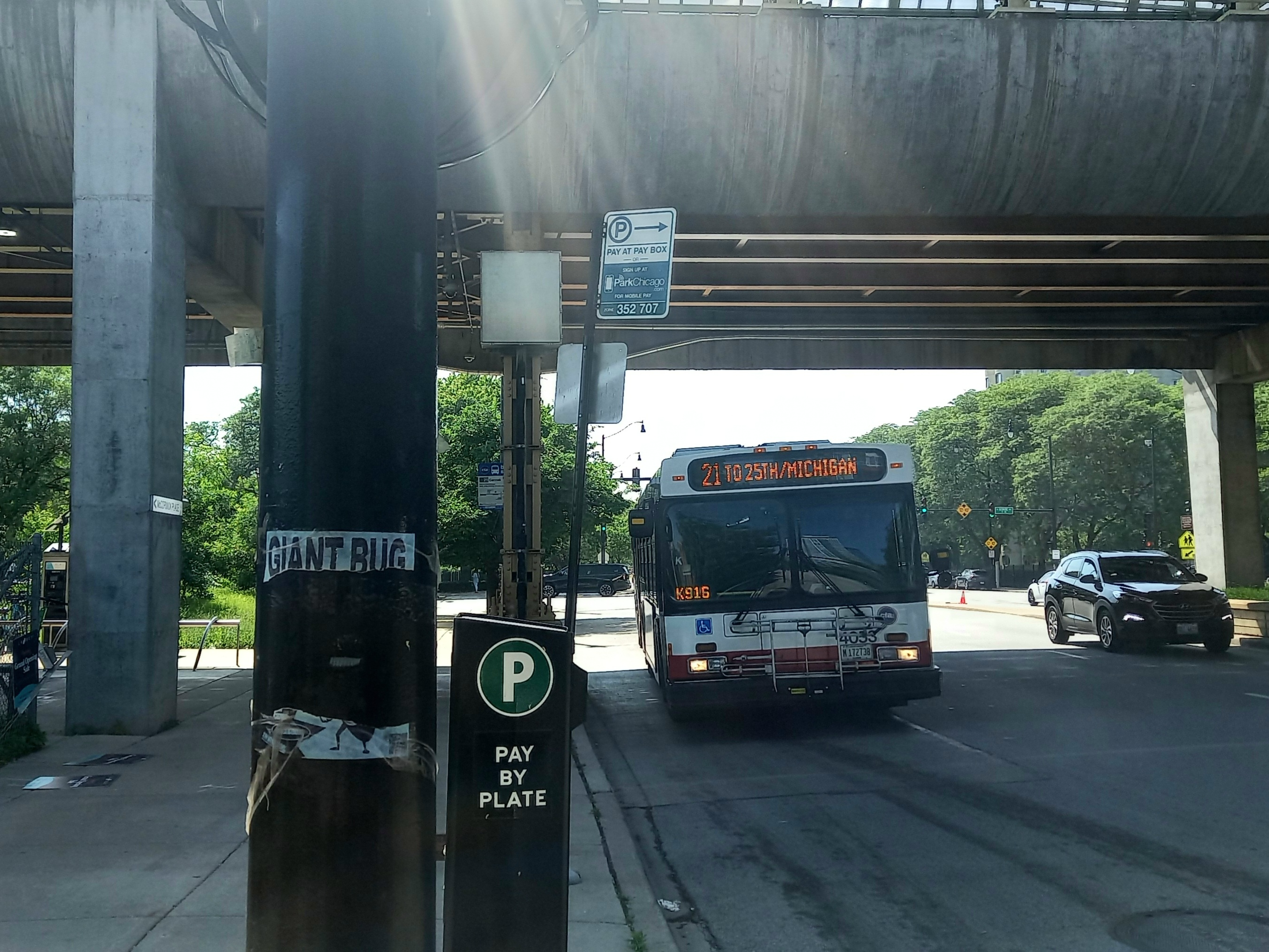
CTA route 21 bus stopping at Cermak–McCormick Place station

Cermak Road is primarily served by 21 Cermak between Insight Hospital and Medical Center and North Riverside Park Mall as well as the 322 Cermak Road–22nd Street between 54th/Cermak station and Yorktown Center. The 3 King Drive, 60 Blue Island/26th, and 54B South Cicero briefly travel along the road.

The road is also served by the following Chicago "L" lines and stations:

- Pink Line at 54th/Cermak and Cicero
- Red Line at Cermak–Chinatown
- Green Line at Cermak–McCormick Place

The addition of a Pace Pulse route on Cermak Road is proposed.

== Major intersections ==
County	Location	mi	km	Destinations	Notes
Cook	Chicago	0.0	0.0	S Martin Luther King Drive	Eastern terminus of Cermak Road in the eastern segment
Cook	Chicago	0.6	0.97	I-55 south (Stevenson Expressway) / I-90 east / I-94 east (Dan Ryan Expressway)	Only accessible southbound of I-55 and eastbound of I-90/I-94
Cook	Chicago	2.5	4.0	CR W48 north (Ashland Avenue)	
Cook	Chicago	3.5	5.6	CR W96 (Western Avenue)	
Cook	Chicago	5.5	8.9	CR W43 south (Pulaski Road)	
Cook	Cicero	6.5	10.5	IL 50 (Cicero Avenue)	
Cook	Berwyn–North Riverside line	9.6	15.4	IL 43 (Harlem Avenue)	
Cook	North Riverside	11.1	17.9	IL 171 (1st Avenue)	Includes cutoff intersection
Cook	Westchester	13.6	21.9	US 12 / US 20 / US 45	
Cook	Westchester–Hillside line	14.64	23.56	CR W22 south (Wolf Road)	
Cook–DuPage county line	Westchester–Oak Brook line	15.5	24.9	I-294 Toll north (Tri-State Tollway)	To mainline toll barrier; only accessible northbound of I-294
DuPage	Oak Brook	17.0	27.4	I-88 Toll / IL 110 (CKC) west (Ronald Reagan Memorial Tollway)	Only accessible westbound of I-88
DuPage	Oak Brook–Oakbrook Terrace line	17.5	28.2	IL 83 (Kingery Highway) to I-88 Toll / IL 110 (CKC) east (Ronald Reagan Memorial Tollway)	
DuPage	Oak Brook–Oakbrook Terrace line	18.8	30.3	IL 56 (Butterfield Road)	
DuPage	Gap in route				
DuPage	Lombard	18.8	30.3	CR 25 (Meyers Road)	
DuPage	Lombard	20.6	33.2	Finley Road	Continues another 0.7 miles as a residential road
DuPage	Gap in route				
DuPage	Glen Ellyn	21.3	34.3	CR 5 (Park Boulevard)	This stretch resumes renamed Fawell Boulevard, signs noting name change present at this intersection and Lambert Road
DuPage	Glen Ellyn–Wheaton line	22.4	36.0	Lorraine Road	End of Fawell Boulevard stretch
DuPage	Wheaton	23.0	37.0	Blanchard Street	Western Terminus
DuPage	1.000 mi = 1.609 km; 1.000 km = 0.621 mi: Incomplete access				
