= Andrew Downie =

Canadian circus proprietor (1863-1930)

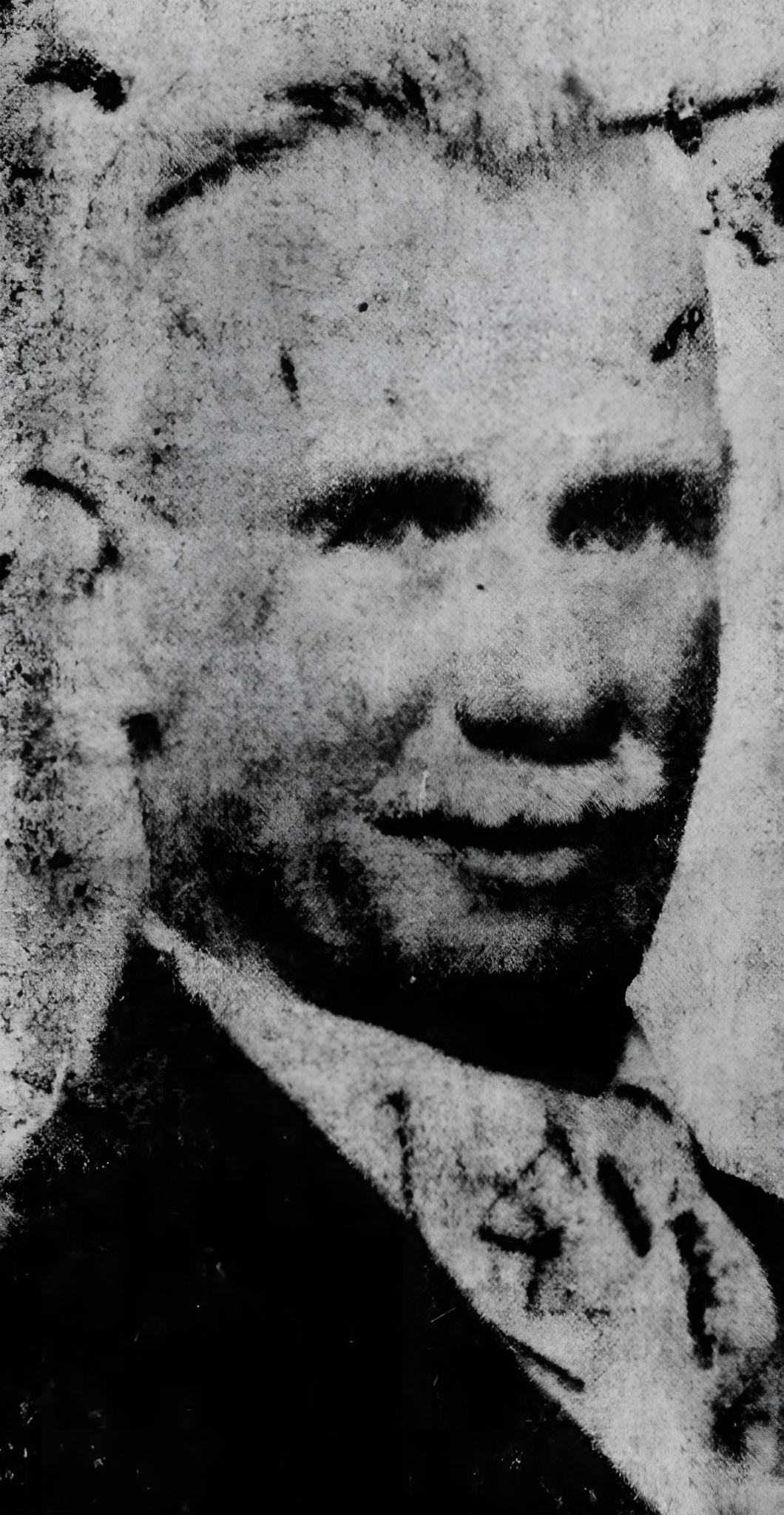
- Born: Andrew Downie McPhee; August 13, 1863; Stephen Township, Ontario, Canada
- Died: December 17, 1930 (age 67); Medina, New York, U.S.
- Resting place: Boxwood Cemetery
- Other names: Andy McPhee
- Occupations: Acrobat; circus proprietor
- Known for: Downie Bros. Motorized Circus
- Spouse: Christena Hewer

Andrew Downie (August 13, 1863 – December 17, 1930) was a Canadian-American showman and circus proprietor.

== Early life ==
Andrew Downie McPhee was born on August 13, 1863, in Stephen Township (now South Huron) near Exeter, Ontario, Canada.

As a child, he moved with his family to Stratford, Ontario. He picked up tumbling skills while practicing in his father's barn.

His father, a veteran of the Fenian raids, became a Stratford hotel proprietor, building the Revere House and managing establishments such as the Toronto House and Junction Hotel. Andrew Downie stayed in Stratford, employed by J. C. Corcoran and later as a railway butcher with the Canada Railway News Company.

== Career ==
Early on, he joined his brother Murdock in a tightrope act for the George W. Donaldson Circus, traveling via horse-drawn wagons.

At the age of 21, he partnered with Clarence Austin, launching a one-ring circus. His 1884 debut as a circus proprietor was advertised as Downie & Austin's Parlor Circus And Trained Animal Combination. The Parlor Circus featured wire-walking by Annie Austin, acrobatics from the Downie brothers, and tricks by Clarence Austin's four trained dogs. It was consolidated with Sig Sautelle's pavilion shows during the summer of 1886.

He joined Ryan & Robinson in 1886, worked with Lowande & Hoffman in 1887, and served as an aerialist and clown with Irwin Bros. during 1887–88.

He tied the knot in 1890 with Christena Hewer from Guelph, Ontario, who was known by the stage name Millie LaTena. He made appearances alongside Millie LaTena during Alexander Herrmann's Trans-Atlantiques tour in 1890.

=== Downie & Gallagher ===
In February 1891, Downie partnered with P. J. Gallagher, a respected Medina cigar dealer, who purchased a half interest in the railroad show. The partnership led to a two-car railroad circus that set off on tour. Downie & Gallagher's railroad circus featured dogs, a riding goat, a performing monkey, trick mules, and ponies. Downie performed a flying trapeze act with Lee Mellville, while his wife juggled atop the rolling globe.

While the show was in winter quarters, Downie stayed with Gallagher in Medina, New York and, in October 1891, toured Manitoba and British Columbia with his wife. Downie & Gallagher's Circus was dealt a minor setback on December 26, 1891, when fire swept through the barns of Chauncey Mead in Medina. Stored there was part of the circus's equipment, valued at about $3,000, which was entirely destroyed and uninsured.

While wintering in Medina, McPhee conceived the idea of using boats on the Erie Canal and Great Lakes. This gave access to the cheaper rates offered by water transport. Downie & Gallagher's wild west show and circus left Medina, New York in June 1892. On July 23, 1892, Downie & Gallagher's Circus clashed with officers in Phoenix, New York, following the seizure of circus property after a canal boat dispute. Urged on by proprietor Downie, circus men knocked a constable into the canal, sparking a gun battle in which several were wounded and an employee fatally shot. Downie and a dozen performers were captured while Gallagher escaped. A Medina lawyer promptly obtained the release of all men five days later, with Downie remaining on $500 bail.

The actor and acrobat moved to Medina, New York, in 1893. He formed Downie & Gallagher's Big Acme Minstrels, performing in Buffalo, New York, as early as January 1893.

He launched Downie's Uncle Tom's Cabin show in 1895.

=== McPhee's Big Dramatic and Vaudeville Co. ===
By January 1899, he started out with his repertory company which became "McPhee's Big Dramatic and Vaudeville Co.," touring the Western United States. He bought two railroad cars and transformed them into show sleepers suitable for use with his company. He carried a company of nearly 30, a band and orchestra, and his wife, Milie LaTena, as leading woman. His niece Florence Forrester did child parts and was featured in her specialties between the acts. He took the company from Winnipeg to the Pacific Coast, complete with scenery, wardrobe, and portable bleachers that could be set up in vacant stores and warehouse barns. He showed for three nights in the Canadian Pacific Railway roundhouse in Red Deer, Alberta. Reaching Vancouver, the company played a week to sell-out audiences in the Lyric Opera House and returned to spend the summer in Eastern Canada. He closed the season in October at Canajoharie, New York.

McPhee established Downie's World's Best Dog And Pony Shows by 1910, featuring seventy-three dogs and twenty-two ponies.

He shipped his show to Oxford, Pennsylvania in the fall of 1910. Following this, he partnered with Al F. Wheeler in 1911, using their combined titles for their first year as a railroad show. He was with the Downie & Wheeler Show until the 1913 season.

=== LaTena's Wild Animal Circus ===
In the spring of 1914, he set out with his own railroad show under the title of "LaTena's Wild Animal Circus," named after his wife. The circus ran with ten railroad cars until spring 1916, when it expanded to fifteen, remaining that size for two years. In 1916, the show visited towns across central Canada.

=== Walter L. Main Circus ===
While in Havre de Grace for the winter, Downie met Joseph Good, a grocer who became a silent partner, and the two soon arranged a deal with Walter L. Main. In 1918, Downie leased the title of the Walter L. Main Circus. The veteran showman ran it for seven years.

In late 1922, Downie incorporated the Downie Amusement Company with $200,000 capital stock and assumed the presidency.

Downie sold the Walter L. Main outfit for $75,000 cash to the Miller Bros. of the 101 Ranch in 1924. Afterward, he retired to Havre de Grace, Maryland, where he devised the scheme of moving a large railroad circus by truck. Due to difficulties of the new owner, McPhee later repurchased the show.

=== Downie Bros. Motorized Circus ===
In 1926, he ran Downie Bros. Wild Animal Circus as its president and founder, the "largest motor circus in the world." He adapted the entire circus for motor truck travel, making it the first circus to be transported successfully by this method. His circus traveled using 38 trucks, five trailers, three tractors, and three advance trucks. In under five years, his success led every circus operator but John Ringling to leave the rails. It was the first outdoor show to succeed on the road. He stepped down from the Downie Bros. Circus in April 1930, taking up residence in Medina. The rights and title of his show were absorbed by Sparks Enterprises in the months before his death.

== Personal life ==
Downie, a prominent Mason and Elk, was also very involved in the Showmen's League of America. He supported charitable causes locally and donated a park to Medina.

== Death ==
Andrew Downie McPhee died on December 17, 1930, in Medina, New York, United States, at age 67.

== Legacy ==
Andrew Downie devoted close to 50 years to the circus profession.
