= Blue Island Avenue =

Street in Chicago

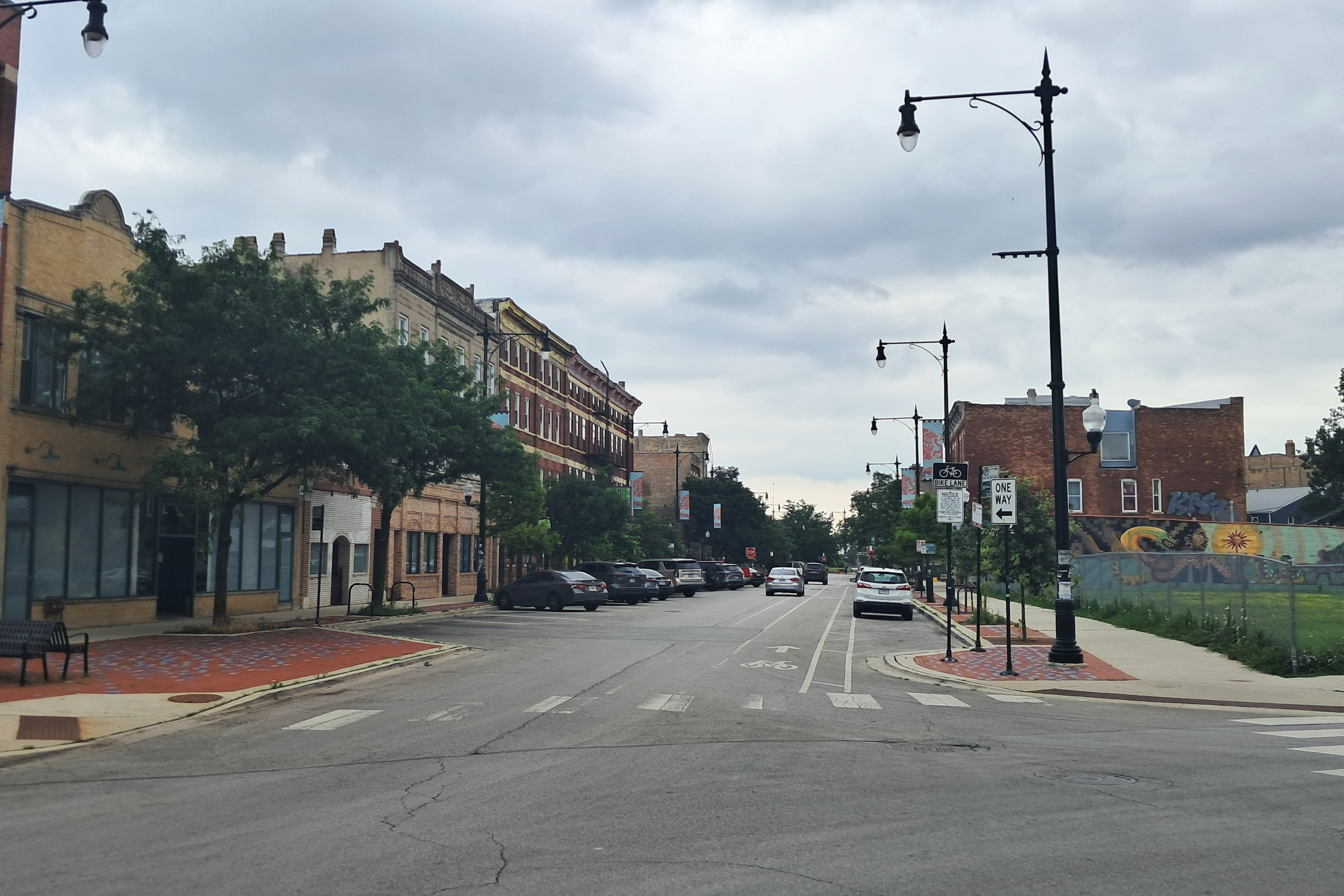
- Blue Island Avenue at 19th Street, 2026
- Southwest end: S. Western Avenue/W. 26th Street in Lower West Side, Chicago
- Northeast end: W. Roosevelt Road in Near West Side, Chicago

Blue Island Avenue is a street in the city of Chicago, Illinois, that once led to a ridge of land that early pioneers gave the name "Blue Island" because at a distance it looked like an island in the prairie. The blue color was attributed to atmospheric scattering or to blue flowers growing on the ridge. Parts of the present-day neighborhoods of Morgan Park, Beverly Hills and the city of Blue Island now occupy this ridge.

== Route description ==
Originally starting from W. Harrison Street and S. Halsted Street, Blue Island Avenue runs between property of the University of Illinois at Chicago and St. Ignatius College Prep, but has been converted into parking lots and recreational areas for the school until it crosses Roosevelt Road. From there it runs southwest to 21st Street, picks up again at Cermak Road (formerly 22nd) and runs more westerly to 26th Street, where it terminates.

== Transportation ==
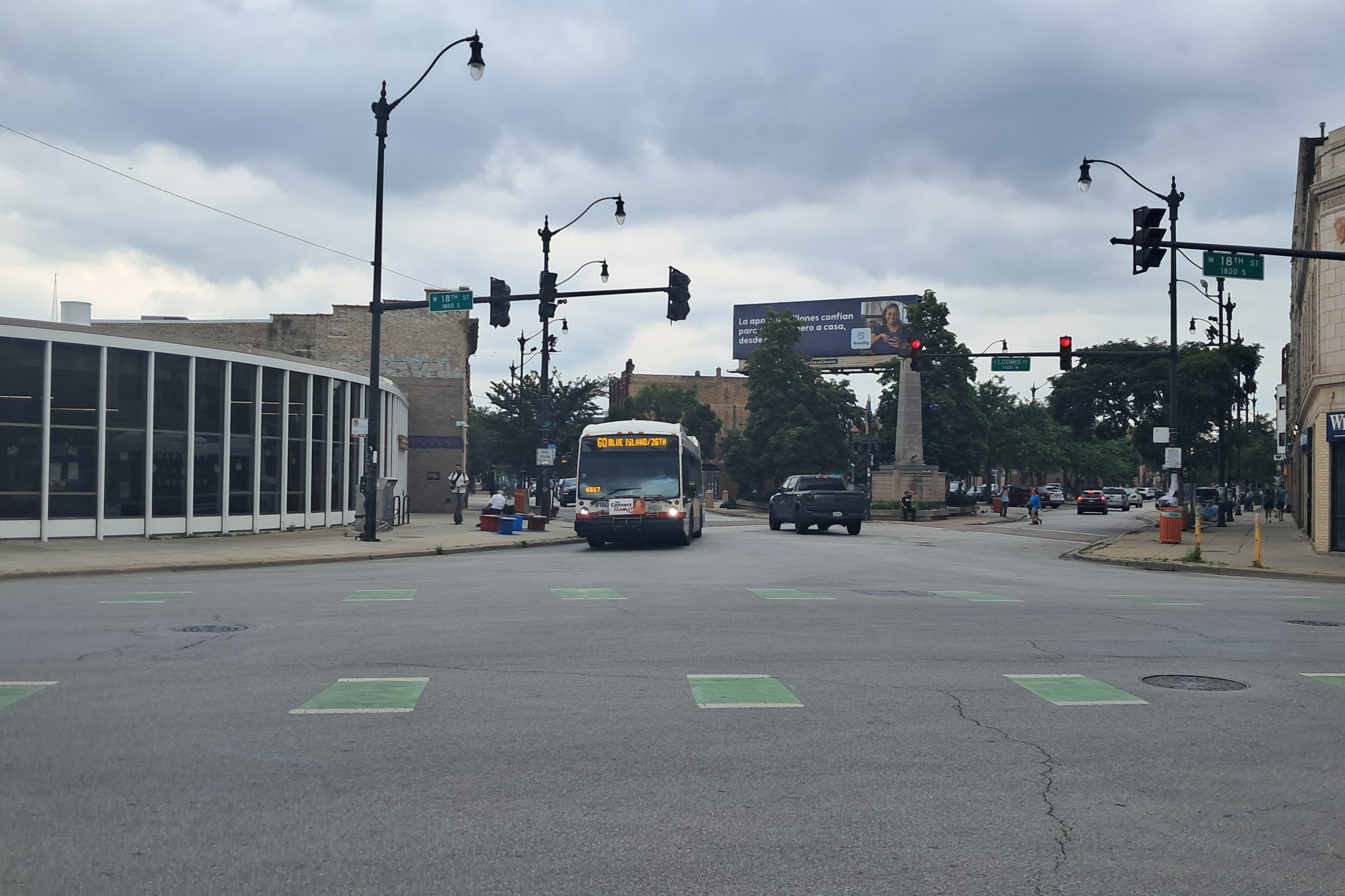
CTA route 60 bus at the intersection of 18th Street, Blue Island Avenue, and Loomis Street

CTA bus route 60 travels along much of Blue Island Avenue from 26th Street to Cermak Road and from Loomis Street to Racine Avenue. Bus route 60 continues west along 26th Street to a bus turnaround at 24th Place/Cicero Avenue near Cicero station; on the other end, the route continues east through downtown, running along the Loop Link bus lanes, toward a turnaround at Harbor Point.

== Intersections ==
The entire route is in Chicago, Cook County.

mi	km	Destinations	Notes
		Harrison Street/Halsted Street	Former northeastern terminus of Blue Island Avenue
		Morgan Street/Taylor Street	
0.00	0.00	Roosevelt Road	Current northeastern terminus of Blue Island Avenue
0.31	0.50	Racine Avenue	
0.76	1.22	18th Street/Loomis St	
1.05	1.69	21st Street	Southwestern end of Blue Island Avenue northern segment
Gap in route (Note: This gap was not present until 1977 with the construction and opening of Benito Juárez Community Academy, which now occupies the gap)
1.21	1.95	Cermak Road/Ashland Avenue	Northeastern end of Blue Island Avenue southern segment
1.77	2.85	Damen Avenue	
2.34	3.77	Western Avenue/26th Street	Southwestern terminus of Blue Island Avenue
1.000 mi = 1.609 km; 1.000 km = 0.621 mi: Closed/former
