= Elephant execution in the United States =

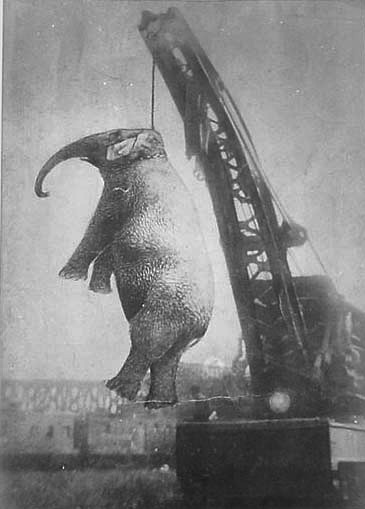
A purported photograph of the execution of an elephant named Mary in 1916

An elephant execution, sometimes called elephant lynching, is a pseudo-legal or performative public spectacle where a captive elephant is killed in order to punish it for being a "bad elephant" (behaviors that had threatened, injured, or killed humans). Documenting the execution or the body with film or still photos was not uncommon. Elephant execution is distinct from both animal euthanasia (in which the animal is put down because it is ill, has behavioral problems, or simply cannot be maintained) and from killing an elephant that is in the midst of an ongoing attack or "rampage".

== History ==
Elephant executions occurred most frequently in the United States during the carnival-circus era of roughly 1850 to 1950; at least 36 elephants were executed between the 1880s and the 1920s. During this era, elephant behavior was often explained anthropomorphically, and thus granted a moral dimension wherein their actions were "good" or "bad."

American animal trainers had little understanding of or experience with elephant musth, a period of late adolescence when juvenile bull elephants begin to transition hormonally and behaviorally to adulthood. The consequences of this ignorance were reliably disastrous: for example, in Mississippi in March 1869 during a phase now recognized as musth, a bull elephant named Hercules became enraged, broke his chains, charged a freight train, and succeeded in derailing the locomotive (at the expense of one of his tusks). The locomotive then crashed into the lion cage, killing the female and releasing the male. (The fate of Hercules himself is unclear.)

In the mind of the animal trainer or carnival owner of the era, a bull elephant was "an unruly brute…who required frequent punishment, without which he would become completely uncontrollable and destroy what showmen built." Non-compliance with human commands was viewed as an elephant "trying to avoid work."

Execution of elephants was thus viewed as appropriate retribution for "criminal" behavior, especially when an elephant had harmed or killed trainers or bystanders. There was a clear-cut parallel between elephant executions and the lynching of minorities, which was both recognized at the time and remains a subject of scholarship.

== List of elephant executions ==
- "Chief", 1860s – unknown, possibly electrocuted.
- "Albert", Keene, New Hampshire, 1885 – firing squad, first public execution of an elephant.
- "Jumbo II", 1901, Buffalo, New York – announced public execution for attacking two keepers and a bystander, failed electrocution, not enough voltage, “Jumbo wagged his tail... looked pleased and trumpeted a bit.”
- "Mandarin", Atlantic coast, 1902 – strangled.
- Topsy, Coney Island, New York, 1903 – owners planned a public hanging as a publicity stunt. ASPCA stepped in and she was euthanized instead via poisoning, electrocution and strangulation.
- Mary, Erwin, Tennessee, 1916 – hanged.

== See also ==
- Animal trial
- Rogue elephant
- Shooting an Elephant – 1936 essay by George Orwell
- Tyke (elephant) – shot by police in Honolulu
