= 86 Bullets =

American hard rock band

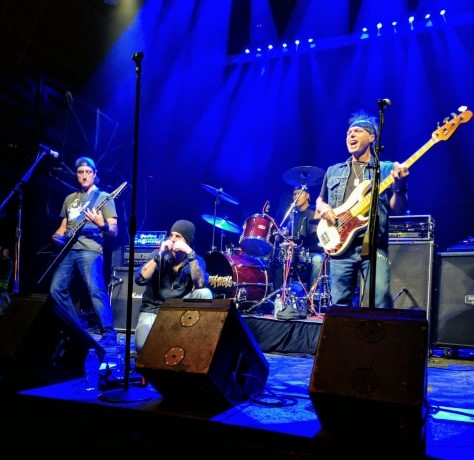
- 86 Bullets in 2017 (L-R: Chris Elliott, Steve Graybeal, Jerry Oxendine, Eric Dee)

Background information
- Origin: Westminster, Maryland
- Genres: hard rock, heavy metal
- Years active: 2015–present
- Label: Melodic Revolution Records
- Members: Steve Graybeal : Vocals; Chris Elliott : Guitar; Jerry "Jyro" Oxendine : Drums; Eric Dee : Bass Guitar

86 Bullets is an American hard rock band from Westminster, Maryland that formed in the fall of 2015. Soon thereafter, the band were invited to play the M3 Rock Festival in the spring of 2016 at the Merriweather Post Pavilion in Columbia, Maryland. In the period of a few months, the band wrote all the music for the show, recorded a four-song, self-titled EP, and released a music video.

== History ==
=== 2016 ===
The year 2016 began with the recording of the band's first EP, which included four tracks; "Reason To Hate," "Hail of Bullets (Ode to Tyke)," "Where I Belong," and "Looking Down the Barrel of a Gun." The second track, "Hail of Bullets (Ode to Tyke)," referenced the incident of Tyke the elephant, which is where the name "86 Bullets" was taken from, in honor and remembrance of Tyke. This quickly became a metaphor for the band, as "86 Bullets is against the abuse and exploitation of animals, children, and anyone else that cannot speak or defend for themselves."

After their self-titled "demo" EP was released in February 2016, the band produced a music video for the song "Where I Belong." On April 30, 2016, the band made their debut at the M3 Rock Festival, sharing the stage with many notable rock bands, including Tesla, Queensrÿche, Night Ranger, Quiet Riot, and Vince Neil. 86 Bullets’ M3 set was notable in that they were the first band ever to perform on the newly revolving stage, and they blew the power out, not once, but twice during their performance. Later in 2016, the band opened shows for Michael Angelo Batio, and Diamond Head, as well as headlining shows along the east coast.

=== 2017 ===
The band's first official album would be released exactly one year to the date of their performance at M3, April 30, 2017. Titled "Angels of Absolution," it was also a four-song EP. In July, the band released a music video for "A Beautiful Lie," and continued to play shows and write new music. A second EP which was released on October 3, 2017, "The Elephant in the Room." This included a guest appearance on bass guitar by Chaz Grimaldi, former bandmate and current touring member of Grim Reaper, on the song "Reason to Hate." During this time period, the band became friends with Crack the Sky bassist Joe Macre, who would go on to become the recording engineer for their next EP and also play bass on one track. By October, the band's exposure on radio stations was steadily increasing, and they were featured and interviewed several times by AXS, the international media company, as well as Shockwave Magazine to close out the year.

=== 2018 and 2019 ===
In February 2018, the music video for "Begin Your Life Again" was released, and the band signed a record deal in March 2019 with Melodic Revolution Records. Shortly thereafter, they began work on their next ep, "Animals and Angels." which was released on June 8. Crack the Sky bassist Joe Macre played on the song "Animals and Angels" and co-produced the album along with sound engineer Josh Clark. Abby Otradovic, from the Baltimore-based heavy metal band Scarlet Angel, added some background vocals to the track. This was also a four-song album which rounded out the trilogy of EPs that would eventually become the band's first full-length album.

In December 2018, 86 Bullets was nominated for "Best Heavy Metal Band" by the Maryland Music Awards Committee. Following a brief hiatus at the end of 2018 into early 2019, the band resumed writing and recording new music. In December 2019, they were confirmed as direct support for Enuff Z'Nuff and Every Mother's Nightmare at the April 2020 MB4 show at the Fishhead Cantina in Baltimore, Maryland.

=== 2020 and 2021 ===
In February 2020, the band released a single, "Burn," which was also slated for their forthcoming album, due for release later in the year. They have a self-titled album, currently available on Spotify, as well as multiple media outlets, which includes twelve tracks from their previous ep's re-mastered with three additional bonus tracks that was released May 1, 2020.

On June 16, 2021, it was announced that a new album entitled "Ascension" is scheduled for release on July 16, 2021, through Melodic Revolution Records.

== Discography ==
Release date	Title	Label
2016	86 Bullets Self-Titled Demo	Independent Release
2017	Agents of Absolution	Independent Release
2017	The Elephant in the Room	Independent Release
2018	Animals and Angels	Melodic Revolution Records
2020	86 Bullets (LP)	Melodic Revolution Records
2021	Ascension (LP)	Melodic Revolution Records

=== Coverage in the Media ===
The band was first interview on April 30, 2016, prior to their performance at the M3 Rock Festival by Rock N Roll Junkie.

Starting in 2016, the band was the subject of multiple articles on the Shockwave Magazine website, which included positive reviews of the "Agents of Absolution" and "The Elephant in the Room" releases, as well as an interview with the band.

In 2018, the band was interviewed by AXS upon their release of the "Begin Your Life Again" video.

In June, they received a positive review of their show at the Fire in Philadelphia by Totally Driven Entertainment.

Their "Animals and Angels" release appeared on Discogs in July 2018.
