= List of circus accidents =

This list of circus accidents includes deaths and injuries that resulted from circus acts that occurred live or during practice. It includes damage to personnel, animals, and the venue.

== 1800s ==
=== Massarti the Lion-Tamer ===
Thomas Macarte, also known as Massarti the Lion-Tamer, was attacked and killed by lions during a performance in Bolton, England on January 3, 1872. He had lost an arm to his profession the decade prior. When trying to drive the five lions from one end of the ring to the other, they attacked him. Despite others attempting to intervene, the pride continued to maul him undeterred. He died on the way to the hospital, age 34.

=== St. Louis Trapeze Accident ===
In 1872, well-known trapeze artists Fred Lazelle and Billy Millson fell to the ground after their trapeze mechanism failed, with Millson sustaining probable injuries to his ribs. George North was beneath the trapeze when it collapsed on him, causing internal injuries. None of the three men performed again.

== 1900s ==
=== Great “Wallace Brothers” Circus Train Disaster ===
On August 8, 1903, one train of the Wallace Brothers, part of the Hagenbeck–Wallace Circus, was idle in the yard of Grand Trunk Railway in Durand, Michigan when a second train drove into it. The air brakes failed, causing the train's front to crash into the rear of the first at 15 miles per hour. 23 people were killed and dozens were injured. Several animals died as well.

=== Otto Kline ===
During a Ringling Brothers and Barnum and Bailey show at Madison Square Garden on April 21, 1915, champion trick rider Otto Kline attempted his famous leaping act, which involved vaulting over a horse and back again while it ran at top speed, when he lost his grip on his horse's saddle and struck his skull against a box, fracturing it. Otto was rushed to Bellvue Hospital where he died that evening from his injuries.

=== Red Eldridge and Mary the Elephant ===
During the Sparks World Famous Show, Walter "Red" Eldridge was tasked with riding an elephant, Big Mary, to a pond where she could drink. When Mary reached to get a watermelon rind, Eldridge smacked her with a hooked whip. In reaction, Mary curled her trunk around Eldridge's body, slammed him to the ground, and trampled the body. After the incident occurred on September 12, 1916, the town of Kingsport, Tennessee publicly hung the elephant by a crane.

=== Hammond Circus Train Wreck ===
On June 22, 1918, the famous Hagenbeck-Wallace Circus suffered a deadly train accident while traveling to a show in Hammond, Indiana. While the second of the team's trains had pulled off to the side to fix an engineering issue, an empty train used to transport soldiers crashed into five wooden sleeping cars, which ignited a quickly-spreading fire. 86 people died and over 100 were injured, making it one of the worst train wrecks in United States history.

=== Cleveland circus fire ===
On August 4, 1942, a fire of unclear origins began in a tent where animals were housed at a Barnum and Bailey Circus performance in Cleveland, Ohio. Thirty-five animals were killed. Several zebras escaped and stampeded toward nearby railroad tracks before being rounded up.

=== Aloys Peters ===
On October 22, 1943, German-American circus performer Aloysius Peters, billed as "The Great Peters" and "The Man With the Iron Neck", was killed when his signature stunt went wrong at the Fireman's Wild West Rodeo and Thrill Circus in St. Louis, Missouri. Peters' act involved leaping from a trapeze bar with a noose around his neck made from an elastic rope. The rope Peters used at his final performance was of inferior wartime quality, affecting his timing, and his neck was broken.

=== Hartford Circus Fire ===
Known as one of the worst disasters in the history of Hartford, Connecticut, a fire of unknown cause erupted during a Barnum & Bailey Circus performance. Unable to get the fire under control and with animal cages blocking the exits, the thousands of attendees panicked and stampeded. In the end, several staff members were convicted for negligence, many survivors suffered physical and mental trauma, and 167 people died.

=== Niterói circus fire ===
The worst fire disaster in Brazilian history occurred in Niterói on December 17, 1961. The flames consumed the cotton tent during a trapeze act and sent the crowd into a panic. Police suspected arson. 503 people died while more than 800 were injured.

=== Flying Wallendas ===
During a performance of the Great Flying Wallendas in Detroit, Michigan on January 30, 1962, two of the seven Wallendas, who were performing a pyramid formation on a high wire, fell to their deaths. The others survived by hanging onto a wire, albeit suffering injuries.

=== Bangalore circus fire ===
The tent of Venus Circus in Bangalore, India caught fire on February 8, 1981. The cause remains unknown, but the fire quickly swept across the tent which then came crashing down onto the crowd of about 4,000. Those who didn't survive were either burned or trampled to death. The disaster claimed 92 lives and injured 300.

=== Oscar Garcia ===
On June 11, 1989, Oscar Garcia was performing on a revolving wheel at Busch Stadium in St. Louis, Missouri when he lost his balance and fell 25 feet (7.6 m) to the ground, dislocating his left wrist and breaking his right elbow.

== 2000s ==
=== Eva Garcia ===
During a performance at the Hippodrome Circus in Great Yarmouth, England, 38-year-old aerial performer Eva Garcia lost her grip and fell 30 feet (9.1 m) to the ground after starting her act, dying on August 8, 2003.

=== Dessi España ===
In Saint Paul, Minnesota, 32-year-old Barnum and Bailey Circus performer Dessi España fell 30 feet (9.1 m) to her death when a scarf loosened as she was twirling on aerial silks. The show, which took place on May 22, 2004, continued despite her accident.

=== Sarah Guyard-Guillot ===
During a Las Vegas, Nevada, performance of Cirque du Soleil's "Kà" on the night of June 29, 2013, 31-year-old Sarah Guyard-Guillot fell 94 feet (29 m) headfirst to her death after she was hoisted up too quickly, causing the safety wire to detach. The company's investigation found that this was due to insufficient training on the equipment.

=== Providence Hair Hangers ===
During an act where performers hang by their hair in a formation like a "human chandelier". The metal frame from which there were hanging detached and the performers fell 25 to 40 feet. They fell onto at least one performer below, causing eleven people in total to be rushed to the hospital. All survived. The Occupational Safety and Health Administration conducted an investigation into the incident. They found the carabiner was in fine condition, but failed due to overloading.

Circus Smirkus

A child fell 17 ft suffering grave injuries, breaking 14 bones including 11 in his neck and spine. The injury was caused by using a non weight bearing loop to suspend the child in the air. ^{30}

== See also ==
- List of circus fires
