= Tyke (elephant) =

Female African bush circus elephant killed by police firing

- Tyke running through the streets, minutes before being shot to death
- Species: Loxodonta africana
- Sex: Female
- Born: 1973; Mozambique, Portugal
- Died: August 20, 1994 (aged 20–21); Honolulu, Hawaii, U.S.
- Cause of death: Gunshot wounds (shot 86 times)
- Occupation: Circus elephant
- Known for: Rampaging through Kakaʻako, killing Allen Campbell and injuring 13 others

Tyke (c. 1973 – August 20, 1994) was a female African bush elephant from Mozambique who performed with Circus International of Honolulu, Hawaii. On August 20, 1994, during a performance at the Neal S. Blaisdell Center, she killed her trainer, Allen Campbell, and seriously injured her groomer, Dallas Beckwith. Tyke then ran from the arena and through the streets of the Kakaʻako central business district for more than thirty minutes. Unable to get the elephant to stop her rampage, local police opened fire on the animal, who collapsed from the wounds and died. While the majority of the attack in the arena was recorded on home video by several spectators, additional professional video footage captured the attack on local publicist Steve Hirano and the shooting of Tyke herself (both of which took place outside of the arena).

== Background ==
A circus elephant going out of control of their circus was not unprecedented. On February 1, 1992, at the Great American Circus in Palm Bay, Florida, a female Asian elephant, known as Janet or Janet Kelly (born 1965) (aged 27-28), went out of control while giving a ride to a mother, her two children and three other children. The elephant stampeded through the circus grounds outside, terrifying circus-goers, before being shot to death by police.

According to Tyrone Taylor, the elephant's responsible trainer at the time, Tyke had been involved in three incidents prior to the attack of August 1994:

On April 21, 1993, Tyke escaped through the front doors of the Jaffa Shrine Center in Altoona, Pennsylvania, during a performance, remaining untethered for an hour. The rampage caused more than $14,000 in damage. An affidavit obtained from a circus worker by the United States Department of Agriculture (USDA) the following day stated that Tyke had also attacked a tiger trainer while the circus was in Altoona.

On July 23, 1993, Tyke rampaged for twenty-three minutes at the North Dakota State Fair in Minot, North Dakota, injuring handler Michael Pursley and frightening onlookers. According to USDA and Canadian law enforcement documents, while a Hawthorn elephant named Tyke (possibly the same Tyke involved in the four aforementioned incidents), was performing with Tarzan Zerbini Circus, a handler by the name of John Caudill "was observed beating the single-tusk African elephant in public to the point [where] the elephant was screaming and bending down on three legs to avoid being hit. Even when the handler walked by the elephant after this, the elephant screamed and veered away, demonstrating fear from his presence."

== Final rampage and death ==
External videos
- "Tyke the Elephant's Last Day on Earth" (contains graphic content)

On August 20, 1994, during a performance at Circus International in Honolulu, Hawaii, Tyke trampled and injured her groomer, Dallas Beckwith, throwing him around numerous times in the process. Her trainer, Allen Campbell, attempted to rescue Beckwith and was subsequently knocked to the ground, dragged and crushed to death under the elephant's massive trunk. Miraculously, Beckwith survived, only suffering from a broken nose. Scared and aggravated, Tyke then charged out of the arena and outside. There she encountered publicist Steve Hirano, who tried to stop her from escaping from the circus parking lot. He closed the gates before she could run out, but as he attempted to lock them, Tyke shoved them back open before he could secure the chain, knocking Hirano to the ground, injuring his ankle in the process. A nearby police officer who witnessed the rampage, fired multiple shots in the direction of Tyke, distracting her and causing her to flee away from Hirano before she could crush him. After a half-hour of chasing Tyke down, which lead to 11 more injuries, two local policemen fired 86 to 87 shots at the 8,000 lb (3,600 kg) elephant. Riddled with bullets, Tyke finally collapsed, bled profusely and died of blood loss from the gunshots.

== Aftermath ==
Following the Hawaii accident, Tyke became a symbol of circus tragedies and of animal rights. Lawsuits were filed against the City of Honolulu, the State of Hawaii, Circus International, Tyke's owner John Cuneo Jr. and Cuneo's company, Hawthorn Corporation.

Honolulu lawyer William Fenton Sink sued Cuneo on behalf of numerous plaintiffs, including young children, who suffered psychological trauma after witnessing the initial rampage and the death of the elephant. While the lawsuits were settled out of court, the details of the monetary decision were kept sealed from publication. In honor of Sink's work in the Tyke case, Animal Rights Hawaii changed the name of its "Order of the Innocent Award" to the "William Fenton Sink Award for Defense of Animals."

Campbell's autopsy revealed that he died from severe internal injuries, including major skull and chest fractures. His body tested positive for alcohol and cocaine.

The incident inspired legislation on local levels in Hawaii and abroad. California Congressman Sam Farr introduced legislation (HR2323) into the House of Representatives in 1999 and again in 2012.

== Legacy ==
In subsequent years, People for the Ethical Treatment of Animals (PETA), claimed that although the Animal Welfare Act of 1966 does not permit any sort of punishment that puts the animals in discomfort, trainers still break this law and use such instruments as cattle prods and bullhooks in their treatment of animals. According to PETA, during an undercover investigation of Carson & Barnes Circus, video footage was captured showing animal care director Tim Frisco training endangered Asian elephants with cattle prods and instructing other trainers to "beat the elephants with a bullhook as hard as they can and sink the sharp metal hook into the elephant's flesh and twist it until they scream in pain."

Later research indicated that wild animals were unsuited to the circus environment. One Dutch investigation into the welfare of circus animals in 2008 found issues like:

- 71% of the observed animals had medical problems.
- Elephants are shackled in chains for 17 hours a day on average.
- Elephants spend on average 10 hours a day showing stereotypic behavior.

Based on these findings, the researchers called for more stringent regulation regarding the welfare of circus animals.

A fourteen-year litigation against Ringling Bros. came to an end in 2014 when The Humane Society of the United States and a number of other animal rights groups paid a $16 million settlement to parent company Feld Entertainment. The circus discontinued its elephant act in May 2016 and sent its pachyderms to a reserve. Ticket sales dropped steeply after, and the circus closed in May 2017 after a 146-year run.

In December 2018, New Jersey became the first U.S. state to ban circuses, carnivals and fairs from featuring elephants, tigers and other exotic animals. Before that, several cities had banned the use of bullhooks or performances by wild animals.

== In popular culture ==
Christian thrash metal band Tourniquet, known for its stance against animal abuse, wrote the song "86 Bullets" about Tyke for their 2012 album Antiseptic Bloodbath.

Tyke was seen on The History Channel show Shockwave, World's Most Amazing Videos, Banned from Television, and Maximum Exposure.

An episode of Hawaii Five-0 referenced the Honolulu attack in its season 6 episode "Ka Haunaele (Rampage)".

Hard rock band 86 Bullets was named after the killing of Tyke, and have a song about the incident, "Hail of Bullets", that appears on their 2017 EP The Elephant in the Room.

== See also ==
- List of individual elephants
- Elephant attacks
- Topsy (elephant)
- Mary (elephant)
- Chunee
- Elephant execution in the United States
