= Niterói circus fire =

1961 fire disaster in Brazil

Coordinates: 22°53′21.78″S 43°7′41.77″W

- Location: Niterói, Brazil
- Date: 17 December 1961; 64 years ago
- Deaths: 503
- Injuries: 800+
- Perpetrators: Adilson Marcelino Alves; Jose dos Santos; Walter Rosa dos Santos

A fire occurred in the tent housing a sold-out performance by the Gran Circus Norte-Americano on 17 December 1961 in the city of Niterói, Brazil, caused more than 500 deaths. It is the worst fire disaster to occur in Brazil.

== Circus ==
The Gran Circus Norte-Americano premiered in Niterói on 15 December 1961. It was advertised as the most complete circus in Latin America, with approximately 60 performers, 20 other employees and 150 animals. Circus owner Danilo Stevanovich had purchased a new tent made of nylon and weighing six tons. The circus arrived in Niterói one week before the premiere, and was set up in the Praça Expedicionário in the city center. The circus tent imported from India had been advertised as being made of nylon, but was actually cotton which, like the tent in the Hartford circus fire, had been treated with paraffin wax, a highly flammable material.

== Fire ==
Setting up the circus required a great deal of time and manpower. Danilo hired about 50 temporary workers. One of them, Adílson Marcelino Alves—known as "Dequinha"—had a police record for theft and suffered from mental health issues. He worked for only two days before being fired by Danilo Stevanovich. Dequinha was furious about his dismissal and began loitering in the surrounding area. On opening night, December 15, 1961, the circus was so packed that Danilo Stevanovich ordered a halt to ticket sales, much to the frustration of many. That night, Dequinha tried to enter the circus without a ticket but was spotted and stopped by the elephant trainer, Edmilson Juvêncio. The following day, Saturday, December 16, Dequinha continued to hang around the circus and began provoking the usher Maciel Felizardo, who was frequently accused of being responsible for Dequinha's firing. An argument ensued, and Felizardo assaulted the former employee, who fought back and swore revenge. On the afternoon of December 17, 1961, Dequinha met with José dos Santos ("Pardal") and Walter Rosa dos Santos ("Bigode") to plot setting fire to the circus. They met at a spot known as "Ponto de Cem Réis," on the border between the Fonseca neighborhood and the city center, and decided to carry out their plan for revenge. One of Dequinha's accomplices, who was responsible for buying the gasoline, warned the ringleader that the circus was sold out and that there was an imminent risk of fatalities. However, Dequinha remained adamant: he wanted revenge and claimed that Stevanovich owed him a significant debt.

The fire occurred during the flying trapeze act, with 3,000 people present under the big top. One of the artists later recounted that she had been waiting on the platform for her partner who was on the trapeze when she spotted the fire. In an effort not to make him fall she waited until he landed on the platform before alerting him, and they jumped into the net under them and escaped the tent. There was at least one reported instance of a Boy Scout in attendance using a pocket knife to slit the walls of the tent open to make another exit. In a little over five minutes, the circus was completely devoured by the flames.

All of the circus' 150 animals were rescued and none had been under the big top at the time of the fire, although three elephants broke from their chains and escaped.

== Victims ==
Of all the casualties, 372 died immediately, with the total reaching 503 dead as others succumbed to their injuries. About 70% of the victims were children, with many eyewitnesses raising claims that the children had been trampled to death by adults attempting to escape the circus tent.

Treatment for the injured was hampered due to short supply of many different treatments and even hospital beds and medical personnel. Many supplies were air-lifted from Rio de Janeiro and São Paulo, and doctors and nurses traveled from larger towns after an appeal on the radio.

== Investigation ==
The fire was soon claimed to have been caused by arson. Three people were arrested and convicted of starting the fire. Independent investigations and opinions point to electrical problems that were covered up.

== Perpetrators ==
The mastermind of the arson attack was identified as Adilson Marcelino Alves, alias "Dequinha", who had a criminal record for theft and mental health issues. He had worked at the circus for only two days before being fired by Danilo Stevanovich. He, along with two other accomplices (Jose dos Santos and Walter Rosa dos Santos) set fire to the circus as retaliation.

On October 24, 1962, Dequinha was sentenced to sixteen years in prison and another six years of hospitalization in a judicial asylum, as a security measure. Eleven years later, on January 31, 1973, he escaped from Vieira Ferreira Neto Penitentiary in Niteroi and was found dead with 13 shots at the top of Boa Vista hill in the same city. The perpetrator of that crime was never identified.

Walter Rosa dos Santos received 16 years' imprisonment and another year in an agricultural colony. Finally, Jose dos Santos was sentenced to 14 years in prison, and another two years in an agricultural colony.

== Aftermath ==
Three days of mourning were declared along with a state of calamity for the area. Brazilian President João Goulart inspected the scene of the fire and authorized federal aid for the victims. The owner of the circus also hoped to organize benefit performances for families of victims.

== See also ==
- List of circus fires
- Hartford circus fire
