= List of circus fires =

Throughout history, multiple circuses have been damaged or destroyed by fire disasters.

Circus fires
Fire	Date	Location	Description	Refs.
Toronto circus riot	July 13, 1855	Toronto, Province of Canada	Due to a conflict between local firefighters and circus clowns, the S.B. Howes' Star Troupe Menagerie & Circus was destroyed by rioters. Firefighters tore down the circus tent and burned it.	
River Falls circus fire	June 21, 1893	River Falls, Wisconsin, US	During a severe thunderstorm, a lightning strike on the center pole in the menagerie of Ringling Bros. Circus killed 8 people instantly and injured around 30 or 40 more, some of the latter succumbing to their wounds. A fire started but was extinguished.	
Huntsville circus fire	October 28, 1916	Huntsville, Alabama, US	A flash fire killed 130 horses at a Ringling Bros. Circus.	
Sanger's Circus fire disaster of 1920	July 15, 1920	Taunton, UK	A fire erupted at Sanger's Circus at around 3:40 PM. Fanned by strong winds, the flame destroyed the big top within four and a half minutes. Four people, including three children, burned to death, while another man died later at the hospital from his burns. More than 20 people received burn treatment.	
Rochester circus fire	February 20, 1940	Rochester, Indiana, US	A short circuit in the paint and blacksmith shop started a fire at Cole Brothers & Robbins circus winter headquarters. No people were killed, but 170 animals were lost; 6 lions, 2 tigers, and 2 leopards were deemed too dangerous to be released and died in the blaze; more than 100 monkeys, 2 zebras, 2 llamas, 2 mouflons, 2 aoudads, 1 pygmy hippopotamus, 1 elephant, and 1 sacred cow also perished. Damages were estimated at US$150,000 (equivalent to $3,450,000 in 2025).	
Cleveland circus fire	August 4, 1942	Cleveland, Ohio, US	A fire of unclear origins began in a tent where animals were housed at a Barnum and Bailey Circus. 35 animals died. Several zebras escaped and stampeded toward nearby railroad tracks before being recaptured.	
Hartford circus fire	July 6, 1944	Hartford, Connecticut, US	The Ringling Bros. and Barnum & Bailey Circus caught fire, and the fire was worsened by the paraffin and gasoline coatings used to waterproof the tent. At least 167 people died and over 700 were injured. The fire was one of the worst fire disasters in US history and was the deadliest fire ever recorded in Connecticut.	
Niterói circus fire	December 17, 1961	Niterói, Brazil	The Gran Circus Norte-Americano caught fire during a sold-out performance. Of all the casualties, 372 died immediately, with the total reaching 503 dead as others succumbed to their injuries. About 70% of the victims were children, with many eyewitnesses raising claims that the children had been trampled to death by adults attempting to escape the circus tent.	
Sinking of the Fleurus	June 26, 1963	Yarmouth, Nova Scotia, Canada	The circus ship Fleurus was filled with performers and animals when it caught fire and sank. All passengers were safely evacuated except for some zebras, which drowned.	
Bangalore circus fire	February 7, 1981	Bangalore, India	The day of the fire was the last day of the circus, with school children being the bulk of the audience. Eyewitnesses later stated that shortly after the trapeze artist landed, cries of "Benki, benki!" ("Fire, fire!") were heard throughout the tent. The fire swept the main tent, which crashed down in flames onto a crowd of about 4,000 people, setting off a stampede towards the exits. The event killed 92 people and injured 300 others.	
Kursk circus fire	December 14, 1996	Kursk, Russia	A cigarette butt discarded by a spectator ignited gasoline that had been poured on the arena floor to keep the dust down. One woman and five monkeys died, and four people were hospitalized for burns.	
Riga circus fire	March 19, 2015	Riga, Latvia	A fire broke out in the Riga Circus at around 3:40 PM. Firefighting was prolonged since the fire brigades had allocated personnel to fighting wildfires in the countryside amid dry weather. The blaze was localized and extinguished after burning an area of 120 square metres (1,300 ft^{2}). No people were injured, although a python died of overheating or smoke inhalation.	

== See also ==
- List of circus accidents
