= Dog and pony show =

Small circus or metaphorically a promotional presentation

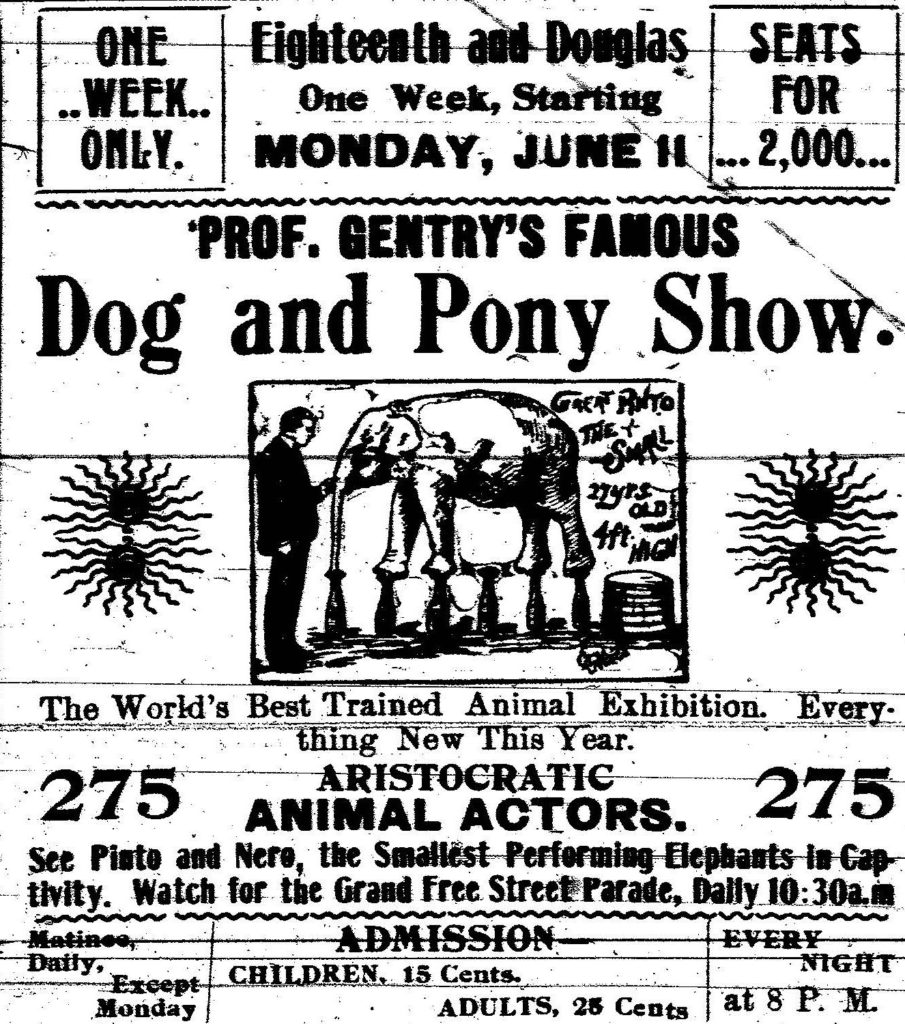
Advertisement for Prof. Gentry's Dog and Pony Show, 1900

"Dog and pony show" is a colloquial term that has come to mean a highly promoted, often over-staged performance, presentation, or event designed to sway or convince opinion for political, or less often, commercial ends. Typically, the term is used in a pejorative sense to connote disdain, jocular lack of appreciation, or distrust of the message being presented or the efforts undertaken to present it.

== Origins ==
The term was originally used in the United States in the late 19th and early 20th centuries to refer to small traveling circuses that toured through small towns and rural areas that were too sparsely populated or remote to attract larger, more elaborate performers or performances. The name derives from the common use of performing dogs and ponies as the main attractions of the events. One was called "Prof. Gentry's Famous Dog & Pony Show," started when teenager Henry B. Gentry and his brothers began touring in 1886 with their act, originally "Gentry's Equine and Canine Paradox," which started small but evolved into a full circus show. Other early dog and pony shows included Morris’ Equine and Canine Paradoxes (1883).
