= Mary (elephant) =

Asian elephant that was hanged to death (1894–1916)

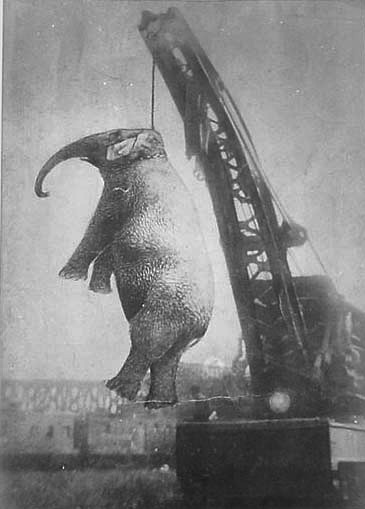
- A photograph, purportedly of Mary's execution in 1916. The authenticity of this photo has been called into question.
- Species: Asian elephant
- Sex: Female
- Born: c. 1894
- Died: September 13, 1916 (aged 21–22); Erwin, Tennessee
- Cause of death: Execution by hanging
- Nationality: United States
- Occupation: Circus performer
- Employer: Charles Sparks
- Years active: 1898–1916
- Tricks: Playing musical instruments Pitching baseballs
- Weight: 5 short tons (4,500 kg)
- Height: 11 ft 9 in (3.58 m)

Mary (c. 1894 – September 13, 1916), also known as "Murderous Mary", was a five-ton Asian elephant who performed in the Sparks World Famous Shows circus. After killing circus employee Walter "Red" Eldridge on his second day as her handler in September 1916, in Kingsport, Tennessee, she was hanged in nearby Erwin.

== Death of Red Eldridge ==
On September 11, 1916, a homeless man named Red Eldridge, who was a janitor at the Riverside Hotel, was hired as an elephant keeper by the Sparks World Famous Shows circus that afternoon. He was killed by Mary in Sullivan County, Tennessee, on the following evening. Although unqualified, Eldridge led the elephant parade, riding atop Mary's back; Mary was the star of the show, walking at the front. There have been several accounts of his death. One, recounted by W. H. Coleman, who claimed to be a witness, is that he prodded her behind the ear with a hook after she reached down to nibble on a watermelon rind. She went into a rage, snatched Eldridge with her trunk, threw him against a drink stand and stepped on his head, crushing it.

A contemporary newspaper account, from the Johnson City Staff, said that Mary "collided its trunk vice-like about [Eldridge's] body, lifted him 10 feet (3.0 m) in the air, then dashed him with fury to the ground... and with the full force of her beastly fury is said to have sunk her giant tusks entirely through his body. The animal then trampled the dying form of Eldridge as if seeking a murderous triumph, then with a sudden... swing of her massive foot hurled his body into the crowd."

== Execution ==
The details of the aftermath are confused in a maze of sensationalist newspaper stories and folklore. For example, the aforementioned newspaper account described Mary as impaling Eldridge with her tusks, despite female Asian elephants lacking tusks. Most accounts indicate that she calmed down afterwards and did not charge the onlookers, who began chanting "Kill the elephant! Let's kill it." Within minutes, local blacksmith Hench Cox tried to kill Mary, firing five rounds with little effect. Meanwhile, the leaders of several nearby towns threatened not to allow the circus to visit if Mary was included. The circus owner, Charles Sparks, reluctantly decided that the only way to quickly resolve the potentially ruinous situation was to kill the wounded elephant in public. On the following day, a foggy and rainy September 13, 1916, Mary was transported by rail to Unicoi County, Tennessee, where a crowd of over 2,500 people (including most of the town's children) assembled in the Clinchfield Railroad yard.

The elephant was hanged by the neck from a railcar-mounted industrial derrick between four o'clock and five o'clock that afternoon. The first attempt resulted in a snapped chain, causing Mary to fall and break her hip as dozens of children fled in terror. The severely wounded elephant died during a second attempt and was buried beside the tracks. A veterinarian examined Mary after the hanging and determined that she had a severely infected tooth in the precise spot where Red Eldridge had prodded her. The authenticity of a widely distributed (and heavily retouched) photo of her death was disputed by Argosy magazine.

== Aftermath ==
In the century following the controversial death of Mary, Erwin was stigmatized as the "town that hanged an elephant" and since then locals have raised thousands of dollars to rescue elephants in an effort to shed the stigma.

== References in popular media ==
- Mark Medoff's dramatic version of the story, Big Mary, was first produced by Great Valley High School in Pennsylvania in 1989 and was published by Dramatists Play Service in 1990.
- George Brant's play Elephant's Graveyard tells the story of Mary's execution through the circus members and the residents of Erwin, first produced by the University of Texas at Austin in 2007 and was published by Samuel French, Inc. in 2010.
- Writer Caleb Lewis wrote a play about Mary and the events that led to her execution, entitled Clinchfield. The play premiered at Flinders University on July 22, 2009.
- Singer-songwriter Chuck Brodsky wrote a song titled "Mary the Elephant".
- Writer Sharyn McCrumb referred to the hanging of Mary in a few of her Ballad novels.
  - In She Walks These Hills, a radio DJ uses the example of "hanging the elephant" as a warning, begging people not to use vigilante justice against an escaped convict.
  - In the first chapter of The Devil Amongst the Lawyers, an elderly reporter brags to a cub reporter about the power of the press, insisting that the circus owner was forced to hang the elephant as a result of his inflammatory newspaper articles.
- Dana Adam Shapiro told the story of Mary in his book You Can Be Right (or You Can Be Married): Looking for Love in the Age of Divorce.
- In the short story anthology McSweeney's Mammoth Treasury of Thrilling Tales, Glen David Gold's story "The Tears of Squonk, and What Happened Thereafter" tells a fictionalized version of Mary's story.
- Jodi Picoult mentions Mary in her 2014 novel Leaving Time.
- mewithoutYou refers to a circus elephant on trial and sentenced to hanging in their 2012 concept album Ten Stories, specifically in the song "Elephant in the Dock".
- Mighty Mary is a 2018 novel by Australian author Max Davine which depicts a heavily fictionalized biography of Mary, including her time in the circus and her trial and eventual execution, published in December 2018.
- The story of Mary's hanging is mentioned in the Scott Pratt novel Judgement Cometh: and That Right Soon, while describing the setting of Erwin, Tennessee.
- In his story "A Walk in the Country" (reprinted in his collection Blood and Grits) Harry Crews writes about meeting someone haunted by the memory of Mary's execution.
- In his Letters to Father Flye James Agee mentions the incident.
- In the novel Demon Copperhead by Barbara Kingsolver the main character is warned "to be careful in Unicoi because there were folks down there mean enough to hang an elephant."
- Mary's execution is referenced in the song "Anthropology Days" by the band The Dead Milkmen on their album 2014 Pretty Music for Pretty People.
- Mary's execution is the subject of the poem "Beasts" in the 2025 poetry collection "Flamingo Brutalism."

== See also ==
- Animal welfare
- Cruelty to animals
- Elephant execution in the United States
- List of individual elephants
- List of unusual animal deaths
- Chunee
- Topsy (elephant)
- Tyke (elephant)
- Ziggy (elephant)
