= Showmen's League of America =

Fraternal organization for circus and carnival professionals

- Founded: 1913; 113 years ago Chicago, Illinois, U.S.
- Type: Fraternal order
- Affiliation: Independent
- Status: Active
- Scope: North America
- Chapters: Multiple, including Chicago (headquarters), St. Louis, and Canada
- Headquarters: Chicago, Illinois; United States
- Website: www.showmensleague.org

The Showmen's League of America (SLA) is a fraternal organization for circus and carnival professionals, founded in Chicago, Illinois, in 1913. It is the oldest organization of its kind in North America.

== History ==
On February 19, 1913, a small group of devoted "outdoor showmen" gathered at the Saratoga Hotel in Chicago, Illinois. Urbine J. "Sport" Herrmann chaired the organizational meeting that founded the Showmen's League of America. The club adopted its name, chose the elephant as its emblem, and collected $1,335 in member donations to start operations.

At its founding, Buffalo Bill Cody, the Wild West show performer, was elected the club's first president. The initial officers of the Showmen's League of America also included Charles Andress as first vice-president, Frank L. Albert as second vice-president, Urbine J. Herrmann as third vice-president, C. W. Parker as treasurer, and Patrick as secretary. Its first board of governors featured Louis E. Cooke, A. H. Barkley, Vernon C. Seaver, Herbert A. Kline, Con T. Kennedy, Fred Gollmar, Al G. Campbell, James Patterson, George Arlton, Tom W. Allen, and Henry B. Gentry.

In its early years, the Showmen's League of America faced the usual challenges of a new organization, but as membership increased, it grew stronger and began fulfilling its intended purpose. In 1917, it launched its hospitalization and sickness program at American Hospital.

The Showmen's League of America gained national recognition in the aftermath of the Hammond Circus train wreck on June 22, 1918. Two weeks prior, it purchased the first section of a burial plot at Woodlawn Cemetery in Forest Park, Illinois, now known as Showmen's Rest. The League came to the aid of the circus performers and ensured a dignified burial for 55 of the dead. By arranging what was then Chicago's largest mass burial, the Showmen's League of America captured public admiration and firmly established itself with showmen nationwide and in Canada.

The benevolent organization grew throughout the 1920s, broadening its charitable work and pursuing new initiatives while remaining true to its founding principles. Responding to the hardships of the Great Depression, a soup kitchen was opened in the early 1930s at its clubhouse on West Madison Street, serving thousands of lunches and suppers to struggling showmen.

By 1939, the League had begun collaborating with other circus groups to establish a home for aging and ailing showmen, pooling resources that included a 20-acre Sarasota land donation from the wife of John Ringling and over $27,000 in combined contributions.

The Showmen's League established its practice of holding annual Yule parties for disadvantaged children, an initiative first organized in the mid-1940s by a committee chaired by Albert Sweeney.

During World War II, the Showmen's League of America, led by Floyd Gooding, ran a package program for members in service. Throughout the war, it sent over 3,000 packages to servicemen. In the postwar years, it distributed over $50,000 to 142 veterans and helped form a showmen's American Legion Post. On July 15, 1947, the Al Sopenar Showmen's League of America Post No. 1008 was chartered in memory of Al Sopenar, a League member killed in World War II. The League provided $1,250 from its Mustering Out Fund to launch the post.

Forty-three years after its founding, the Showmen's League established its own club facilities in 1957 at a four-story building on the corner of Chicago's Randolph and Franklin streets. Purchased in 1956, it was modernized with a new facade, reworked interior, automatic elevator, modern restrooms, and updated kitchens. The building housed a public restaurant, lounge-TV room, offices, bar, and a meeting room across its four floors.

The Showmen's League of America, by 1957, had provided extensive support to the outdoor show community: it opened the first club-owned cemetery, buried over 660 members (including Showmen's Rest and train wreck victims), and arranged hospitalization for 1,620 members.

In 1960, its membership totaled more than 1,500 members throughout the United States and Canada, encompassing circus and carnival owners, managers, agents, fair officials, theatrical booking agents, performers, actors, and independent showmen.

The League's network includes chapters in St. Louis and Canada, along with its Chicago headquarters. St. Louis was incorporated as a chapter of the Showmen's League of America in November 1965.

== Past presidents ==
The following showmen have served as president of the Showmen's League of America:

- William F. Cody (1913)
- John B. Warren (1914–1918)
- Edward C. Talbot (1918–1920)
- Edward F. Carruthers (1921–1922)
- Edward P. Neumann (1923)
- Jeremiah Mugivan (1924)
- Fred M. Barnes (1925–1926)
- Edward A. Hock (1927–1928)
- Milton M. Morris (1929)
- W. O. Brown (1930)
- Sam J. Levy (1931–1932)
- C. R. “Zebbie” Fisher (1933)
- Ernie A. Young (1934)
- J. W. “Patty” Conklin (1935–1936)
- J. C. McCaffery (1937–1939)
- Frank P. Duffield (1940)
- Frank B. Conklin (1941)
- Carl J. Sedlmayr (1942)
- Jack Nelson (1943)
- Floyd E. Gooding (1944)
- Sam Solomon (1945)
- Fred H. Kressmann (1946)
- Irving J. Polack (1947)
- R. L. Lohmar (1948)
- Robert Parker (1949)
- Morris Lipsky (1950)
- Louis Keller (1951)
- S. T. Jessop (1952)
- Albert J. Sweeney (1957)
- Edward Sopenar (1960)
- C. C. Groscurth (1962–1963)
