= Henry B. Gentry =

American circus proprietor (1864–1940)

Henry Briton Gentry
- Born: November 9, 1864; Bloomington, Indiana, U.S.
- Died: May 7, 1940 (age 75); Bloomington, Indiana, U.S.
- Resting place: Rose Hill Cemetery
- Occupation: Circus proprietor
- Known for: Dog and pony show
- Awards: Monroe County Hall of Fame

Henry B. Gentry (November 9, 1864 – May 7, 1940) was an American showman and circus proprietor who was a co-founder of the Gentry Bros. Circus.

== Early life ==
Henry Briton Gentry was born on November 9, 1864, in Bloomington, Indiana, United States.

On Bloomington's outskirts, Henry lived with his family on a farm located where South Rogers Street now runs through the McDoel Gardens area.

His brothers included Wallace, Will, and Frank H. Gentry.

== Career ==
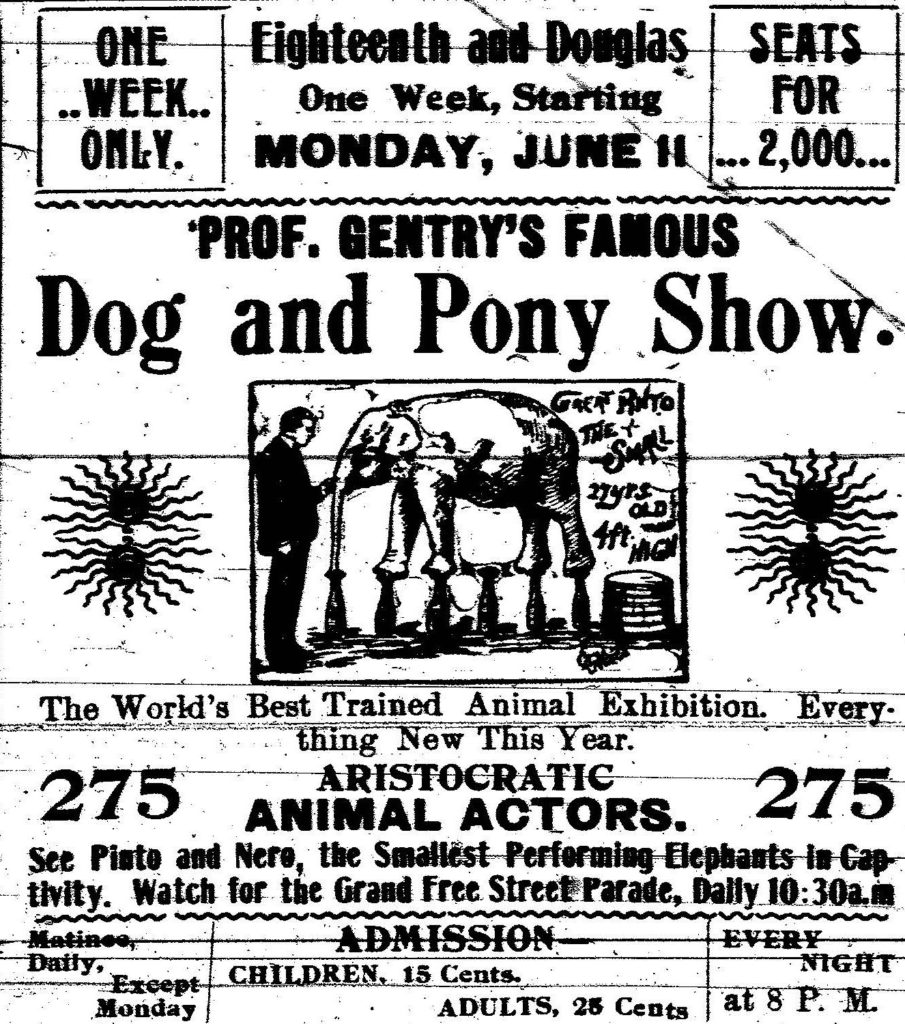
Prof. Gentry's Famous Dog and Pony Show, Omaha Sunday Bee, June 10, 1900

After seeing the famed Van Amburgh's Circus, young Henry B. Gentry trained his family dog, "Old Shep," to perform tricks, later adding more farm animals to the small dog and pony show.

In 1881, Gentry became an assistant to "Prof. Morris," a self-styled "world's greatest trained animal showman" with a troupe of twelve dogs. After leaving a job as a grocery clerk, he traveled with the show for four years. It was called "Professor Morris's Operatic Dog Troupe."

Following his apprenticeship under Morris, he branched out on his own, training stray curs and debuting at the Opera House in Bloomington.

In 1885, he persuaded his three brothers to launch a traveling show with twenty dogs titled "Gentry's Equine and Canine Paradox." By 1887, it had evolved into the "Gentry Bros. Circus." By 1899, four separate shows were operating, each under the management of one of the Gentry brothers.

H. B. Gentry returned to Bloomington in the mid-1890s and bought a two-story brick building and replaced it with the Gentry Hotel at Sixth Street and College Avenue. At the time of its construction, Gentry's hotel ranked among the best from Louisville to Chicago, while he acquired multiple other properties on College Avenue.

On June 20, 1902, Gentry purchased McKinney (2:11¼) for $25,000 from Charles A. Durfee of San José, California. McKinney was regarded in trotting horse history as the greatest speed sire of his time. His decision to buy McKinney was influenced by his close friendship with Budd Doble, who served as intermediary in the deal.

A U.S. patent was granted to Henry B. Gentry on March 16, 1903. He personally filed and was recognized as the inventor of a "Pleasure-Railroad" (essentially a portable loop-the-loop amusement ride). The legal ownership of the patent was transferred to the Gentry Brothers circus company.

The Gentry Brothers Circus had, by 1910, gained a reputation as the largest traveling show in the United States. Around 1916, the Gentrys sold their circus for an estimated $100,000 and Henry moved on to manage the Sells Floto Circus. He was offered the managerial position by F. G. Bonfils and Harry Heye Tammen of the Denver Post. Henry B. Gentry managed operations as general manager and also presided over the Champion Shows company, which controlled the circus. Gentry was paid a salary of $15,000 a year, then the highest salary paid to any circus man in America.

Henry B. Gentry approached Charles Sparks in late 1928 with a deal to buy his show. On November 26, Sparks accepted, not realizing that Gentry was merely an agent of the American Circus Corporation, concealing a plan to resell the title. The circus remained under the management of H. B. Gentry and, by 1929, was resold to John Ringling, who purchased the entire American Circus Corporation.

Henry B. Gentry, working with Frank H. Gentry in 1931, attempted to bring the show back to its former glory, taking Gentry Bros. Famous Shows and the Original Gentry Bros. Circus on tour until 1934.

== Death ==
Henry B. Gentry died on May 7, 1940, in Bloomington, Indiana, United States.

== Legacy ==
H. B. Gentry was inducted into the Monroe County Hall of Fame in 1978.
