= Heritage of the March =

Album series, 1973–1988

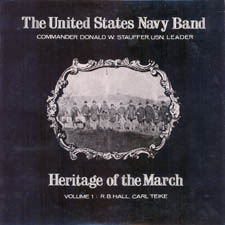
The first album in the series, recorded by the United States Navy Band

Heritage of the March is a series of 185 vinyl records of marches and galops released from 1973 to 1988. It remains the largest single march music record series in history, featuring close to 3,000 different marches.

The records were distributed free by march collector Robert Hoe and the series was continued after his death by the Robert Hoe Foundation created by his wife, Marilyn C. Hoe. Most records featured the marches of two composers (one per side) played by a military, college, high school, or community band. The albums were given volume numbers 1 through 90 and A through QQQQ.

C. L. Barnhouse Company also publishes sheet music under the "Heritage of the March" label.

== Series organization ==
The liner notes from the first record noted that the series was not meant to be chronological, the order in which composers were presented was determined solely by logistical matters, and the total number of albums in the series was not predetermined. The liner notes also stipulated that "The marches selected have rarely, if ever, appeared in commerically [sic] recorded form. The most popular and widely played marches will be omitted for obvious reasons of policy." Later, the series was envisioned as 15 albums featuring an American composer on one side of the record and a foreign composer on the reverse. All of these early albums were performed by the United States Navy Band under the direction of Donald W. Stauffer.

As the series continued to grow, other military bands in the United States were included with the United States Coast Guard Band, United States Military Academy Band, and the Armed Forces Bicentennial Band recording volumes 16 through 30. Starting with volume 31, the series was opened to a wider number of bands both inside and outside the armed services, including bands outside the United States. These recordings formed the "numbered" portion of the series. The "lettered" portion of the series presented additional music by composers who had already been featured in the numbered albums.

There were a few irregularities in the series' numbering and lettering system. Volumes 89 and OOOO were omitted. Volume QQQQ was erroneously labeled as the previously released Volume PPPP. Volumes 54 and 84 were each two-record sets. All together, there were 91 numbered and 94 lettered albums.

== Composers ==
The first album was recorded by the United States Navy Band for release in 1973 and featured marches composed by Robert Browne Hall and Carl Teike.

A large variety of composers were featured on the recordings. Some of the most recorded include Fred Jewell, Karl L. King, Monroe Althouse, Russell Alexander, Thomas Brooke, Roland F. Seitz, James M. Fulton, Hermann Blankenburg, Charles Barnhouse, Julius Fučík, and W. P. Chambers. Some records do not feature a specific composer, but are themed albums, such as circus marches, marches of Quebec, or marches featuring the euphonium. Some albums also included concert works or marches from "miscellaneous" composers.

Volume	Composers
1	Robert Browne Hall; Carl Teike
2	John N. Klohr; Alexander F. Lithgow
3	Frederick A. Jewell; Hermann L. Blankenburg
4	W. Paris Chambers; Arthur W. Hughes
5	Frank H. Losey; Gian Battista Mantegazzi
6	Charles L. Barnhouse; Viktor M. Widqvist
7	Russell Alexander; Gabriel Pares
8	Joseph Olivadoti; Franz Lehár
9	Walter P. English; Franz von Blon
10	John C. Heed; Thomas Bidgood
11	Charles E. Duble; Carl Friedemann
12	David Wallis Reeves; Julius Fucik
13	Harold J. Crosby; Pascual Marquina
14	Harry L. Alford; Kenneth J. Alford
15	Sam H. Rydberg; U.S. Navy Band leaders
16	Charles Storm; Francisco Alonso
17	Charles Sanglear; Giuseppe Creatore
18	Edwin Eugene Bagley; Ezra M. Bagley; Richard Eilenberg
19	John S. Taylor; Santiago Lope
20	Victor Herbert; Per Berg
21	Jean M. Missud; Julius Lehnhardt
22	William H. Apelles; Carl M. Ziehrer
23	Peter Buys; Louis-Philippe Laurendeau
24	James O. Brockenshire; Max Oscheit
25	Karl L. King; Paul Lincke
26	Monroe A. Althouse; Gerardo Iasilli
27	Thomas Preston Brooke; Mariano San Miguel
28	Joseph John Richards; Gabriel Allier
29	George Rosenkrans; Francis Popy
30	William H. Kiefer; Stephen Jaeggi
31	Harvey J. Woods; Hermann Bellstedt
32	Herbert L. Clarke; James DeForest Cline
33	Marches of Quebec
34	Ernst Stieberitz; Hale A. VanderCook
35	Claudio S. Grafulla; Pablo Luna
36	James M. Fulton; Karel Komzak
37	Roland F. Seitz; Hermann Silwedel
38	Thomas H. Rollinson; Floyd J. St. Clair
39	Arthur W. Pryor; Gustave Louis Ganne
40	Joseph O. DeLuca; Wilhelm Zehle
41	Albert G. Sweet; Charles Post; Dexter W. Platt
42	Thornton B. Boyer; Frank Seltzer
43	Josef Franz Wagner; William H. Scouton
44	Heinrich Steinbeck; Ellis Brooks
45	Will Huff; Henry Fillmore
46	Guy E. Holmes; George D. Barnard
47	Raphael Oropesa Clausin; Florencio Ledesma Estrada; George D. Sherman
48	Frantisek Kmoch; Johann Kral
49	Frank Panella; Louis Panella
50	Annibale Buglione; Godfrey Buglione
51	Ernest S. Williams; J. Bodewalt Lampe
52	Harry R. Hughes; John Castro; Roberto Orlando
53	Orion R. Farrar; Hans Heusser
54	Marches of Quebec (double album)
55	Arthur Davenport; Abraham Holzmann
56	Hermann Dostal; Eduard Wagnes
57	Carl Unrath; Ernst Urbach
58	Thomas Clark; Henry A. Hall
59	Thomas S. Allen; Victor J. Grabel
60	Hiram C. Miller; Charles Rockwell
61	Jack C. Lentini; Joseph S. Peckham
62	George Rosey; Leon Jessel
63	Marches featuring euphonium
64	Hermann Pecking; Clarence W. Dalbey
65	Fred K. Huffer; F. Glenn Halley
66	Ludwig Siede; Alfred F. Weldon
67	Giuseppe Manente; William L. Skaggs
68	Richard E. Hildreth; Francis A. Myers
69	Chester E. Whiting; Christopher Bach
70	Giovanni Orsomando; various concert works
71	Joseph Pecsi-Prichystal; Emil Stolc
72	Robert Vollstedt; Martin Domingo; Pablo Cambronero
73	Charles A. Zimmerman; Michele F. Lozzi
74	Morton Gould; John Hazel
75	Charles W. Bennet; Allesandro Liberati
76	Martin Schroder; Feliks Nowowiejski
77	Joseph Gung'l; Jaroslav Labsky
78	Johann G. Piefke; Rudolf Piefke; Anton Rosenkrans; Joseph Gung'l; Jaroslav Labsky
79	Mayhew L. Lake; Nicholas C. Brown
80	Carl Faust; Ruperto Chapi
81	Ralph B. Eisenberg; Walter Esberger
82	Keith P. Latey; Louis F. Boos
83	Adolf Hansen; Johannes Hanssen
84	Various marches and concert works (double album)
85	Alvin Willis; Felice DeMatteo
86	Jaime Texidor; Leo R. Stanley
87	Johann Strauss, Sr.; Josef Strauss; Oscar Strauss
88	Eduard Strauss; Richard Strauss; Johann Strauss, Jr.
89	Not issued
90	Eduardo Boccalari
A	John C. Heed; Charles L. Barnhouse
B	Frederick A. Jewell; Charles E. Duble
C	Frederick A. Jewell; Robert Browne Hall
D	David Wallace Reeves; W. Paris Chambers
E	Robert Browne Hall; John C. Heed
F	Harold J. Crosby; Frank H. Losey
G	Charles L. Barnhouse; Hermann L. Blankenburg
H	Robert Browne Hall; Gabriel Pares
I	Frederick A. Jewell; John N. Klohr
J	Carl Teike; Hermann L. Blankenburg
K	Frank H. Losey; Gian Battista Mantegazzi
L	John S. Taylor; Karl L. King
M	Joseph John Richards; Hermann L. Blankenburg
N	Karl L. King; Frederick A. Jewell
O	Charles L. Barnhouse; Richard Eilenberg
P	Robert Browne Hall; Frederick A. Jewell
Q	Franz von Blon; Charles Sanglear
R	Karl L. King
S	David Wallace Reeves; Louis-Philippe Laurendeau
T	Thomas Bidgood; Robert Browne Hall
U	Russell Alexander; Carl Teike
V	Gian Battista Mantegazzi; Paul Lincke
W	Louis-Philippe Laurendeau; W. Paris Chambers
X	Carl Friedemann; Hermann L. Blankenburg
Y	Harold J. Crosby; Frank H. Losey
Z	Joseph John Richards; John S. Taylor
AA	W. Paris Chambers; Russell Alexander
BB	Monroe A. Althouse; John N. Klohr
CC	Karl L. King
DD	Oscar Borg; Karl L. King
EE	Charles E. Duble; Walter P. English
FF	Hermann L. Blankenburg; Charles L. Barnhouse
GG	Roland F. Seitz; Hale A. VanderCook
HH	Franz von Blon; Joseph John Richards
II	Louis-Philippe Laurendeau; Roland F. Seitz
JJ	Hermann L. Blankenburg; Richard Eilenberg
KK	Hermann L. Blankenburg; Gabriel Allier
LL	Frederick A. Jewell; George Rosenkrans; Viktor M. Widqvist; Carl Teike; John Philip Sousa
MM	Thomas H. Rollinson; Robert Browne Hall
NN	Karl L. King
OO	William Rimmer; Robert Browne Hall
PP	Charles Sanglear; Hale A. VanderCook
QQ	Karl L. King
RR	Karl L. King
SS	Hermann L. Blankenburg; Karl L. King
TT	Monroe A. Althouse; Karl L. King
UU	Jean M. Missud; James M. Fulton
VV	Julius Lehnhardt; Gustav Lenhardt; Joseph O. DeLuca
WW	Hermann L. Blankenburg; Robert Browne Hall
XX	Floyd J. St. Clair; Jean M. Missud
YY	Floyd J. St. Clair; Karl L. King
ZZ	Thomas J. Powell; circus marches by various composers
AAA	Claudio S. Grafulla; Julius Fucik; Frank H. Losey
BBB	John C. Heed; James M. Fulton
CCC	Russell Alexander; Charles Storm; Hermann L. Blankenburg
DDD	Gabriel Allier; Gabriel Pares
EEE	Hermann L. Blankenburg
FFF	Claudio S. Grafulla; Thornton B. Boyer
GGG	Frank Seltzer; Orion R. Farrar
HHH	Ivar Widner; Karl L. King
III	Joseph John Richards; Karl L. King
JJJ	Harvey J. Woods; George Rosenkrans
KKK	James M. Fulton; Thomas H. Rollinson
LLL	Ernst Stieberitz; Alexander F. Lithgow
MMM	Georg Furst
NNN	William M. Kiefer; Roland F. Seitz
OOO	John C. Heed; Ellis Brooks
PPP	Julius Lehnhardt; Gustav Lehnhardt; Heinrich Steinbeck
QQQ	George Rosenkrans; Karl L. King
RRR	Various composers
SSS	John C. Heed; Thomas Preston Brooke
TTT	Monroe A. Althouse
UUU	Fernand Andrieu; Francis Popy; H. Staz
VVV	Josef Franz Wagner; Arthur W. Pryor
WWW	Arthur W. Hughes; Henry Fillmore; Will Huff
XXX	Karl L. King
YYY	Roland F. Seitz; Arthur W. Pryor
ZZZ	Hermann L. Blankenburg; Karl L. King
AAAA	Franz von Blon
BBBB	Franz von Blon; Gay Corrie; Giovanni Orsomando
CCCC	David Wallace Reeves; James M. Fulton
DDDD	Monroe A. Althouse; Thomas Preston Brooke
EEEE	Various composers
FFFF	Hermann L. Blankenburg; Karl L. King
GGGG	Joseph John Richards; Karl L. King
HHHH	Hermann L. Blankenburg; Monroe A. Althouse; Louise-Philippe Laurendeau
IIII	Various composers
JJJJ	William H. Scouton; Clarence W. Dalbey
KKKK	William H. Apelles; Gian Battista Montegazzi
LLLL	various composers
MMMM	William Rimmer; Alexander F. Lithgow
NNNN	Carl Friedemann; Hermann Silwedel
OOOO	Not issued
PPPP	Per Grundstrom; Josef Franz Wagner
QQQQ*	Pascual Marquina; Sigmund Romberg; Ruperto Chapi

== Production ==
Robert Hoe obtained most of the sheet music himself for the collection, which was meticulously cataloged and inspected by him and his "staff". There are almost no marches recorded more than once in the series. Many of the records feature specific notes on the marches, either given by the conductor of the group or by Hoe himself. Every album contains notes on topics such as the Heritage of the March series, historical backgrounds on composers, instrumentation, the band recorded, or various personal stories.

The series included some material other than marches, including waltzes and overtures written by the featured composer. Hoe, an avid fan of the euphonium, recorded several euphonium solos such as "Elfriede" by George Swift, and an arrangement of "Figaro" by Paul Yoder. Hoe also allowed bands to record their own personal favorites, and were sometimes used as "fillers" for the LPs.

Many marches that were originally recorded for use in the Heritage of the March series but not included in the LPs were later released as part of the three-volume Navy Band Leftovers and four-volume Miscellaneous Marches. A spinoff series was also created called the Heritage of John Philip Sousa, consisting of 18 LPs featuring Sousa's marches and operettas performed by the U.S. Marine Band.

== Availability ==
The Heritage of the March records were previously available free of charge to the friends of Robert Hoe and to those who requested them from the Robert Hoe Foundation. Bands who were recorded also received their own records for professional or personal use. The records were produced in small batches of between 600 and 2,000 copies of each record. The records themselves were never commercially available to the public. Today, it is possible to find these records in libraries, second-hand record stores, and other music archives.

Digital copies of select volumes were officially made available for purchase on Amazon and iTunes beginning in 2010. Altissimo Recordings, in collaboration with the Robert Hoe Foundation, began making the collection available as compact discs with the release of the Heritage of John Philip Sousa in Summer 2011, followed by the first two volumes of the Heritage of the March in 2012.
