= March (music) =

Musical genre, originally for marching

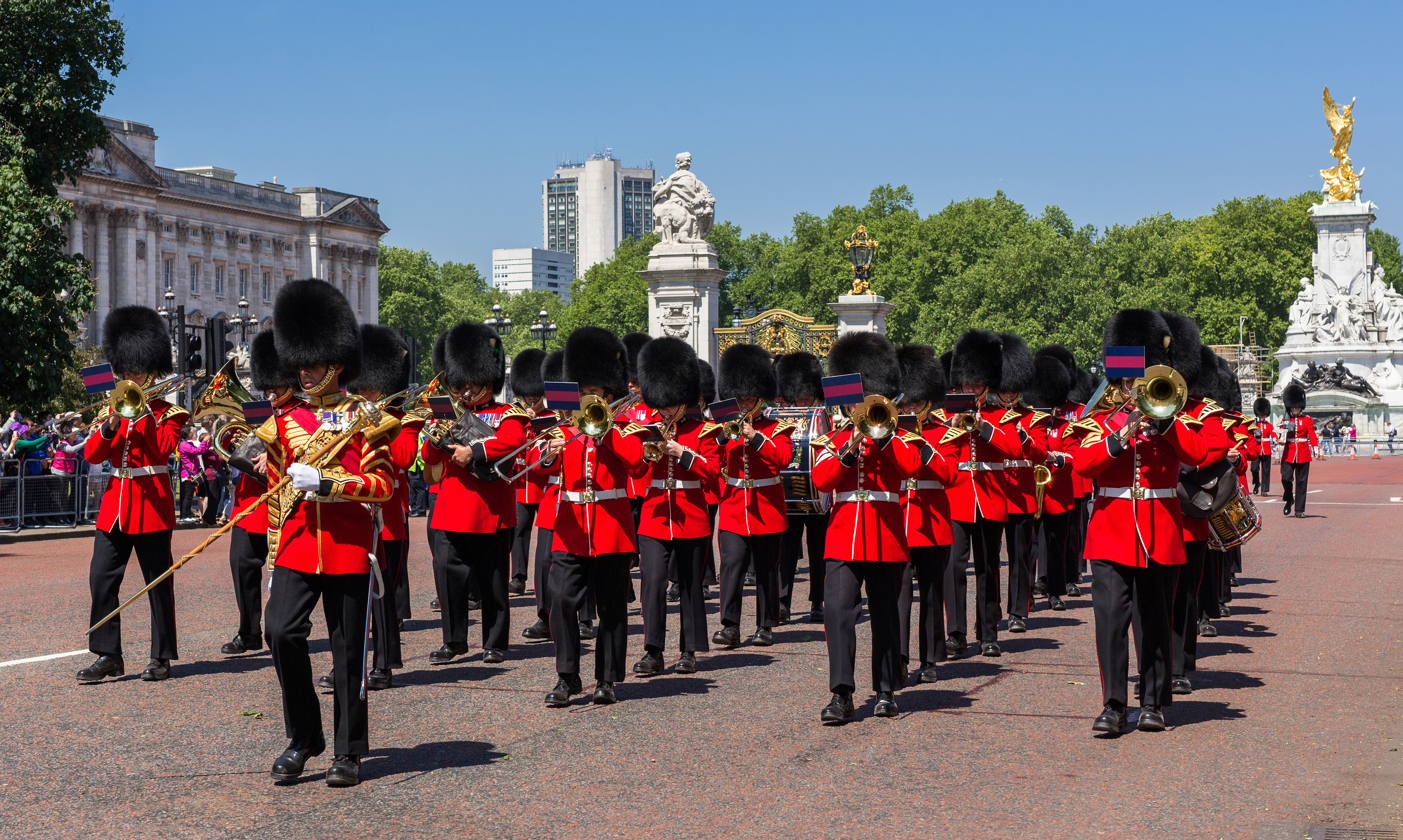
The Band of the Welsh Guards of the British Army play as Grenadier guardsmen march from Buckingham Palace to Wellington Barracks after the changing of the Guard.

A march is a musical composition with a strong regular rhythm which in origin was expressly written for lockstep marching of soldiers. As a musical genre, it is a type of martial music, most frequently performed by a military band during parades.

March music pieces vary widely in mood, ranging from the emotional funeral march in Wagner's Götterdämmerung to the brisk Romantic marches of John Philip Sousa and the militaristic hymns of the late 19th century. Examples of the varied use of the march can be found in Beethoven's Eroica Symphony, in the Marches Militaires of Franz Schubert, in the Marche funèbre in Chopin's Sonata in B flat minor, the "Jäger March" in the Op. 91a by Jean Sibelius, and in the Dead March in Handel's Saul.

== Characteristics ==
Marches can be written in any time signature, but the most common time signatures are 4/4, 2/2 (alla breve, although this may refer to 2 time of Johannes Brahms, or cut time), or 6/8. However, some modern marches are being written in 1/2 or 2/4 time. The modern march tempo is typically around 120 beats per minute. Many funeral marches conform to the Roman standard of 60 beats per minute. The tempo matches the pace of soldiers walking in step. Both tempos achieve the standard rate of 120 steps per minute.

Each section of a march typically consists of 16 or 32 bars, which may repeat. Most importantly, a march consists of a strong and steady percussive beat reminiscent of military field drums.

A military music event where various marching bands and units perform is called tattoo.

Marches frequently change keys once, modulating to the subdominant key, and occasionally returning to the original tonic key. If it begins in a minor key, it modulates to the relative major. Marches frequently have counter-melodies introduced during the repeat of a main melody. Marches frequently have a penultimate dogfight strain in which two groups of instruments (high/low, woodwind/brass, etc.) alternate in a statement/response format. In most traditional American marches, there are three strains. The third strain is referred to as the "trio". The march tempo of 120 beats or steps per minute was adopted by the Napoleonic army in order to move faster. Since Napoleon planned to occupy the territory he conquered, instead of his soldiers carrying all of their provisions with them, they would live off the land and march faster. The French march tempo is faster than the traditional tempo of British marches; the British call marches in the French tempo quick marches. Traditional American marches use the French or quick march tempo. There are two reason for this: First, U.S. military bands adopted the march tempos of France and other continental European nations that aided the U.S. during its early wars with Great Britain. Second, the composer of the greatest American marches, John Philip Sousa, was of Portuguese and German descent. Portugal used the French tempo exclusively—the standard Sousa learned during his musical education. A military band playing or marching at the traditional British march tempo would seem unusually slow in the United States.

March music originates from the military, and marches are usually played by a marching band. The most important instruments are various drums (especially snare drum), horns, fife or woodwind instruments and brass instruments. Marches and marching bands have even today a strong connection to military, both to drill and parades.

March music is often important for ceremonial occasions. Processional or coronation marches, such as the popular coronation march from Le prophète by Giacomo Meyerbeer and the many examples of coronation marches written for British monarchs by English composers, such as Edward Elgar, Edward German, and William Walton, are all in traditional British tempos.

== History ==
Drum – Cadence A

Drum – Cadence B

Drum – Four Flams
Drum cadences performed by the United States Navy Band

Marches were not notated until the late 16th century; until then, time was generally kept by percussion alone, often with improvised fife embellishment. With the extensive development of brass instruments, especially in the 19th century, marches became widely popular and were often elaborately orchestrated. Composers such as Wolfgang Amadeus Mozart, Ludwig van Beethoven, Hector Berlioz, Pyotr Ilyich Tchaikovsky, Gustav Mahler, Ralph Vaughan Williams, Charles Ives, Arnold Schoenberg, Igor Stravinsky, Alban Berg, Sergei Prokofiev, Paul Hindemith, Dmitri Shostakovich, and Leonard Bernstein wrote marches, sometimes incorporating them into operas, sonatas, suites, and symphonies. The popularity of John Philip Sousa's band marches has been unmatched.

The style of the traditional symphony march can be traced back to symphonic pieces from renaissance era, such as pieces written for nobility.

== National styles ==
=== European march music ===
Radetzky March
Austrian composer Johann Strauss's "Radetzky March" arranged for the United States Marine Band

Florentiner March
Czech composer Julius Fučík's "Florentiner March" performed by the United States Navy Band

Many European countries and cultures developed characteristic styles of marches.

==== Britain ====
British marches typically move at the standard pace of 116 beats per minute, have intricate countermelodies (frequently appearing only in the repeat of a strain), have a wide range of dynamics (including unusually soft sections), use full-value stingers at the ends of phrases (as opposed to the shorter, marcato stinger of American marches). The final strain of a British march often has a broad lyrical quality to it. Archetypical British marches include "The British Grenadiers" and those of Major Ricketts, such as the well-known "Colonel Bogey March" and "The Great Little Army".

Scottish bagpipe music makes extensive use of marches played at a pace of approximately 90 beats per minute. Many popular marches are traditional and of unknown origin. Notable examples include Scotland the Brave, Highland Laddie, Bonnie Dundee and Cock of the North. Retreat marches are set in 3/4 time, such as The Green Hills of Tyrol and When the Battle's O'er. The bagpipe also make use of slow marches such as the Skye Boat Song and the Cradle Song. These are set in 6/8 time and are usually played at around 60 beats per minute if played by only pipe bands (and 120 if played with a military band).

Those marches indicative of the light infantry and rifle regiments of the Army (today The Rifles and the Royal Gurkha Rifles), like "Silver Bugles" and "Bravest of the Brave", move at a faster 140 beats per minute pace and feature the distinctive bugle sounds common to the bands of these units (plus bagpipes for the Gurkhas).

==== Germany and Austria ====
German marches move at a very strict tempo of 114 beats per minute, and have a strong oom-pah polka-like/folk-like quality resulting from the bass drum and low-brass playing on the downbeats and the alto voices, such as peck horn or trombone and snare drums, playing on the off-beats. This provides a very martial quality to these marches. The low brass is often featured prominently in at least one strain of a German march. To offset the rhythmic martiality of most of the strains, the final strain (the trio) often has a lyrical (if somewhat bombastic) quality. Notable German and Austrian march composers include Carl Teike ("Alte Kameraden"), Ludwig van Beethoven ("Yorckscher Marsch"), Hermann Ludwig Blankenburg, Johann Gottfried Piefke ("Preußens Gloria"), Johann Strauss I ("Radetzky March"), Johann Strauss II, Hans Schmid, Josef Wagner, and Carl Michael Ziehrer.

==== Sweden ====
Swedish marches have many things in common with the German marches, much due to historical friendship and bonding with states like Prussia, Hesse and, from 1871 and on, Germany. The tempo is strict and lies between 110 and 112 beats per minute. The oom-pah rhythm is common, although it is rarely as distinctive as in a typical German march. The first bars are nearly always played loudly, followed by a cheerful melody, often with pronounced countermelodies in the euphoniums and trombones. At least one strain of a Swedish march is usually dedicated to the low brass, where the tubas also play the melody, with the rest of the instruments playing on the off-beats. The characteristics of the trio vary from march to march, but the final strain tends to be grand and loud. Examples of Swedish marches are "Under blågul fana" by Viktor Widqvist and "På post för Sverige" by Sam Rydberg.

==== France ====
French military marches are distinct from other European marches by their emphasis on percussion and brass, often incorporating bugle calls as part of the melody or as interludes between strains. Most French marches are in common metre and place a strong percussive emphasis on the first beat of each bar from the band and field music drumlines, hence the characteristic BOOM-whack-whack-whack rhythm. Many, though not all French marches (in particular marches dating from the period of the French Revolution) make use of triplet feel; each beat can be felt as a fast triplet. Famous French marches include "Le Régiment de Sambre et Meuse", "La Victoire est à Nous", "Marche de la garde consulaire à Marengo", "La Galette", the "Chant du départ", "Le Chant des Africains", "Le Caïd", "la Marche Lorraine" and "Le Boudin". While many are of the classic quick march time used today, there are several which are of slow time, harking to the slow and medium marches of soldiers of the French forces during the Revolution and the Napoleonic Wars. Part of the French Foreign Legion's current march music inventory includes at lot of slow marches. Also, there are marches similar to those of British rifle regiments which are used by the Chasseur infantry battalions of the Army.

==== Greece ====
Greek marches typically combine French and German musical traditions, due to the modern Greek State's history of Germanic royal dynasties, combined with Francophile governments as well as French and Bavarian officers and military advisors, who brought their respective musical traditions with them, with later British influences. Among the most famous marches are "Famous Macedonia" (Μακεδονία Ξακουστή), a march to commemorate Greece's victory in the Balkan Wars, "Greece never dies" (Η Ελλάδα ποτε δεν πεθαίνει), "The Aegean Sailor" (Ο Ναύτης του Αιγαίου), "The Artillery" (Το Πυροβολικό), "From flames, Crete" (Από φλόγες, η Κρήτη), and "The Army Marches Forth" (Πέρναει ο Στρατός). Almost all Greek marches have choral versions. Many of these marches, in the choral versions, are also popular patriotic songs, which are taught to Greek children in school and are sung along on various occasions, such as national holidays and parades. "Famous Macedonia" also serves as the unofficial anthem of the Greek Region of Macedonia. The Greek Flag March (Greek: Προεδρική Εμβατήριο "Η Σημαία") is the sole march used during the parading of the Greek Flag at ceremonies. Composer Margaritis Kastellis contributed to the development of many Greek pieces for military bands only.

==== Netherlands ====
Dutch marches typically feature a heavy intro, often played by the trombones, euphoniums, drums, and tubas, followed by a lighthearted trio and a reasonably fast and somewhat bombastic conclusion, while maintaining occasional bugle calls due to the former wide presence of field music formations (particularly in the Army). Dutch emphasis on low brass is also made clear in that some Dutch military bands use sousaphones, which have a more forward projection of sound, rather than the regular concert tubas used by most other European military styles. Some well-known Dutch march composers are Jan Gerard Palm, Willy Schootemeyer, Adriaan Maas, Johan Wichers, and Hendrik Karels. By far, most Dutch military bands perform their music on foot; however, some Dutch regiments (most notably the Trompetterkorps Bereden Wapens) carry on a Dutch tradition in which its historical bicycle infantry had a mounted band, thus playing march music on bikes.

==== Italy ====
Italian marches have a very light musical feel, often having sections of fanfare or soprano obbligatos performed with a light coloratura articulation. This frilly characteristic is contrasted with broad lyrical melodies reminiscent of operatic arias. It is relatively common to have one strain (often a first introduction of the final strain) that is played primarily by the higher-voiced instruments or in the upper ranges of the instruments' compass. Examples of Italian march music is "Il Bersagliere" (The Italian Rifleman) by Boccalari and "4 Maggio" by Creux. Uniquely, the Bersaglieri regiments always move at a fast jog, and their running bands, mostly all-brass, play at this pace, with marches like "Passo di Corsa dei Bersaglieri" (Double March of the Bersaglieri) and "Flick Flock" as great examples.

==== Spain ====
The most characteristic Spanish march form is the pasodoble. Spanish marches often have fanfares at the beginning or end of strains that are reminiscent of traditional and popular music. These marches often move back and forth between major and (relative) minor keys, and often show a great variation in tempo during the course of the march reminiscent of a prolonged Viennese rubato. Military marches are an adapted form of the pasodoble, which feature strong percussion and have British and French influences as well, as well as German, Austrian and Italian elements. Typical Spanish marches are "Amparito Roca" by Jaime Teixidor, "Los Voluntarios" by Gerónimo Giménez, and "El Turuta" by Roman de San Jose. Many of these marches are also of patriotic nature.

A significant amount of incidental music as marches has been composed and still is composed annually for the Moors and Christians festivals and festivities (Moros y Cristianos) in the south-east region of Spain. It is known as música festera and comes from military band marches. There are currently three main genres: the classic and popular pasodobles, the melodious marchas moras (Moorish in style), and the forceful marchas cristianas.

==== Basque Country ====
Raimundo Sarriegui (1838–1913) is nicknamed the 'John Philip Sousa of the Basque Country' because of its marches, which at the flag-raising (izado) and flag-falling (arriado) ceremony of the Tamborrada on the Plaza de la Constitución (Constitution Square), especially the Marcha de San Sebastián (San Sebastián march, officially approved by the City Hall), which is the mirrored version of the Washington Post March by J.P. Sousa are considered 'super super slow marches'. During the 24 hours, soldiers (soldados), cooks (cocineros) and water carriers (aguadoras) play the drums (tambores) and barrels (barriles) along with the much faster marches of the composer like Tatiago, the Diana, the Polka or Iriyarena. Children also dress up as soldiers, cooks and water carriers and play the drums and the barrels. Both have a drum major, which is the accompaniment and director for the children and adults.

==== Czechia ====
Notable Czech march composers include František Kmoch and Julius Fučík, who wrote "Entrance of the Gladiators".

=== American march music ===
The Stars and Stripes Forever
John Philip Sousa's "The Stars and Stripes Forever", the national march of the United States, performed by the United States Marine Band

The Circus Bee
Henry Fillmore's "The Circus Bee", a screamer, performed by the United States Marine Band

The true march music era existed from 1855 to the 1940s when it was overshadowed by jazz, which the march form influenced (especially through ragtime). American march music cannot be discussed without mentioning "The March King", John Philip Sousa, who revolutionized the march during the late 19th and early 20th centuries. Some of his most famous marches are "Semper Fidelis", "The Washington Post", "The Liberty Bell", and "The Stars and Stripes Forever". Sousa's marches are typically marked by a subdued trio, as in "The Stars and Stripes Forever" in which the rest of the band becomes subordinated to arguably the most famous piccolo solo in all of music. Typically, an American march consists of a key change (usually the addition of a flat), often happening for the duration the Trio. The key may change back before the song is over, especially if the Trio ends well before the last few bars of the march.

A specialized form of the typical American march music is the circus march, or screamer, typified by the marches of Henry Fillmore and Karl King. These marches are performed at a significantly faster tempo (140 to 200 beats per minute) and generally have an abundance of runs, fanfares, and other showy features. Frequently, the low brass has one or more strains (usually the second strain) in which they are showcased with both speed and bombast. Stylistically, many circus marches employ a lyrical final strain which (in the last time through the strain) starts out maestoso (majestically, slower and more stately) and then, in the second half of the strain, speeds up to end the march faster than the original tempo.

=== Asian march music ===
==== Bangladesh ====
Bengali march music tradition began in the 19th century, during the Bengali Renaissance by the Bengali nationalists. Kazi Nazrul Islam, the national poet of Bangladesh and active revolutionary during the Indian Independence Movement create a separate subgenre of Bengali music known as Nazrul Geeti included march music against fascism and oppression. His writings and music greatly inspired Bengalis of East Pakistan during the Bangladesh Liberation War.

The most famous of Bengali marches is the Notuner Gaan, which is the national march of the People's Republic of Bangladesh. Among the most popular Bengali marches are the following:

- Pralayollas (প্রলয়োল্লাস (Pralay.ōllās); The Ecstasy of Destruction or Destructive Euphoria)
- Bidrohi (বিদ্রোহী (Bidrōhī); The Rebel) (Marchpast of the Bangladesh Army)
- Kandari Hushiar (কান্ডারী হুশিয়ার (Kānḍārī Huśiy.ār); Captain Alert) (Marchpast of the Bangladesh Navy)
- Mora Jhonjhar Moto Uddam (মোরা ঝঞ্ঝার মত উদ্দাম (Mōrā Jhañjhār Mata Uddām); A Mountain Song) (Marchpast of the Bangladesh Air Force)

==== India ====
Currently, marches played at military ceremonies in India have British origins. For example, ‘Auld Lang Syne’ played during passing out parades at various military academies is a tune that originated in Britain. Similarly, ‘Abide With Me’, is a Christian hymn, that is traditionally played as the last tune at the Beating the Retreat ceremony on January 29 every year. The marches that independent India's military bands plays is a mix of British classics (The British Grenadiers, Trafalgar, Gibraltar) and tunes composed by officers. Over the years, the military bands began to play an eclectic mix of the standard marching songs, as well as jazz, Bollywood and Indian compositions.

The Indian military bands consists of musicians from the Indian Army, Navy and Air Force. The primary bands include Indian Army Chief's Band, Indian Naval Symphonic Band and No. 1 Air Force Band. Today, the Indian Armed Forces have more than 50 military brass bands and 400 pipe bands and corps of drums. A Tri-Services Band refers to a joint Indian Armed Forces military band that performs together as a unit.

The band performs a number of slow and quick marches such as:

- Sare Jahan se Accha (Patriotic March)
- Qadam Qadam Badhaye Ja (Army Quick March)
- Samman Guard (Army Slow March)
- Vande Mataram
- Deshon Ka Sartaj Bharat

==== Japan ====
Defile March (分列行進曲）)
Charles Leroux's "Defile March", the signature march of the Imperial Japanese Army, performed by the Imperial Japanese Army Band.

Warship March (行進曲「軍艦」)
Setoguchi Tokichi's "Warship March" as performed by the Imperial Japanese Navy Band

Japan's march music (Koushinkyoku, 行進曲) tradition began in the 19th century after the country's ports were forced open to foreign trade by the Perry Expedition. An influx of Western musical culture that the newly arrived traders and diplomats brought with them swept through Japanese musical culture, leaving a lasting legacy on the country's music. Japanese and foreign musicians of the time sought to impart Western musical forms to the Japanese, as well as combining Japanese-style melodies with Western-style harmonization. Furthermore, with Japan's government and society stabilized after the Meiji Restoration, the country sought to centralize and modernize its armed forces, with the armed forces of France and Prussia serving as models. All of these helped augur in what would later become modern Japanese music. The march genre, already sharing roots with the preexisting tradition of "gunka", or military songs, became very popular, especially in the years after Japan's victories in the First Sino-Japanese War and the Russo-Japanese War.

One of the earliest and most enduring of Japanese marches is the Defile March (分列行進曲) composed in 1886 by Charles Leroux, an officer with the French Army serving as an advisor to the Imperial Japanese Army. Originally two separate marches based on Japanese melodies—Fusouka (扶桑歌) and Battotai (抜刀隊), inspired by the Satsuma Rebellion and reportedly a favorite song of the Emperor Meiji—they were later combined in the march currently recognized today. It soon became a very popular band standard, with the Imperial Japanese Army adopting it as their signature march. After World War II the JGSDF and the Japanese police would adopt the march, where it continues to be a core part of their repertoire.

In the years before 1945, many distinguished composers such as Yamada Kōsaku, Nakayama Shimpei, Hashimoto Kunihiko, Setoguchi Tōkichi, and Eguchi Yoshi (Eguchi Gengo) all contributed to the genre. Some were military and nationalist in tone. Others, like Nakayama's 1928 Tokyo March (東京行進曲), were meant for popular consumption and wholly unrelated to military music.

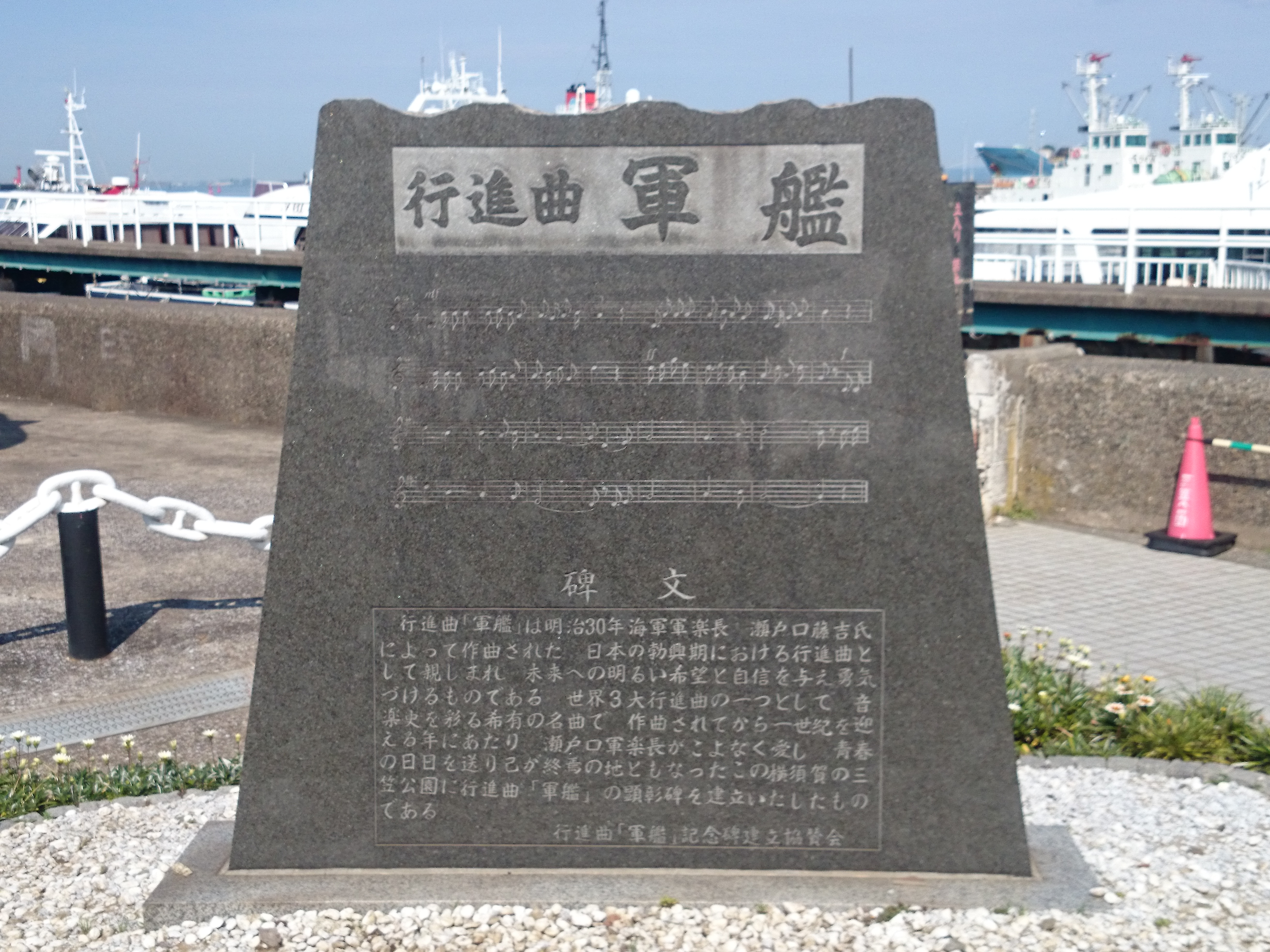
Statue of "Warship march"

Among the most popular Japanese marches are the following:

- Defile March (分列行進曲) (Marchpast of the Imperial Japanese Army and of today's Japan Ground Self-Defense Force)
- Warship March (Gunkan, 行進曲「軍艦」) (Marchpast of the Imperial Japanese Navy and of today's Japan Maritime Self-Defense Force)
- Kankanshiki March (観艦式行進曲)
- Kimigayo March (君が代行進曲)
- Pacific March (太平洋行進曲)
- Patriotic March (愛国行進曲)
- Oozora (行進曲「大空」) (Marchpast of the Self-Defence Forces)
- Tokyo Olympic March (オリンピック・マーチ), composed for the 1964 Summer Olympics
- Shukuten march (祝典行進曲) (For crown prince Akihito celebration of marriage in 1959)
- Sora no Seiei (空の精鋭) (Marchpast of Japan Air Self-Defence Force)

==== Philippines ====
"Lupang Hinirang" (Chosen Land)
Julián Felipe's "Lupang Hinirang", the Philippine National Anthem, performed by the Armed Forces of the Philippines Band.

"Bagong pagsilang" march
Felipe Padilla-De León's Bagong pagsilang March, performed by the Malabon Band.

The Philippine march tradition is a mix of European and American traditions plus local musical styles. Several famous Philippine composers composed marches, and even Julián Felipe composed the march that would become Lupang Hinirang, the national anthem. Several marches are adaptations of local folk music, others have a patriotic feeling.

The Philippine march music tradition began in the 19th century, during the Philippine Revolution, as an offshoot of the Spanish march tradition. This is a popular form of music as a battle hymn in the same way as in the US or France specially if Filipino soldiers are going to war or winning battles, is also the way of the Filipino to express their nationalistic affection to their native land. This style of music was also popular during the Philippine–American War and during the Second World War.

During the late 1960s this form of music begun to be widely used as a part of military drills, parades and exercises of the Armed Forces, National Police and Coast Guard, as well as by youth uniformed groups and athletes. Prominent local march composers include Antonio Buenaventura and National Artist Lucio San Pedro. Some famous marches are:

Title/piece	Composer	Description
Lupang Hinirang	Julián Felipe	The national anthem of the Philippines
Alerta Katipunan! (On alert Katipunan!)	Anonymous	One of the well-known marching songs by the Katipunan and Philippine Revolutionary Army.
Marangal na Dalit ng Katagalugan (Salve Patria) (Noble hymn of the Tagalogs)	Julio Nakpil	Tagalog hymn
Sampaguita March (Flor de Manila)	Dolores Paterno	Military/festival march
Mabuhay!	Tito Cruz Jr.	Presidential march
Ang Bayan Ko (my Nation)	José Corazón de Jesús	Patriotic song
Bagong Pagsilang (March of the New Society)	Felipe Padilla de León	A patriotic hymn during the Ferdinand Marcos administration
AFP on the March		March past of the Armed Forces of the Philippines
Martsa ng Kawal Pilipino		Official hymn of the Armed Forces of the Philippines
Philippine Army March	Antonio Buenaventura	March past of the Philippine Army adopted in the late 40s
Marcha Libertador (March of the Liberators)	Posidio Bermejo Delgado	Revolutionary march composed in 1898, today official march of the town of Sta. Barbara in Iloilo

==== Thailand ====
Thailand's late king, Bhumibol Adulyadej, is a march composer. His most famous march piece, the "Royal Guards March", is played by military bands during the Thai Royal Guards parade at the Royal Plaza at Bangkok every 2 December yearly. It reflects the use of German and British military band influences in Thai military music.

==== China ====
Chinese marches tend to originate from time of the Second Sino-Japanese War, with very few still being performed that were composed before 1930 (one notable exception to this is the Military anthem of China, which dates back to the late Qing Dynasty with lyrics commissioned by Zeng Guofan). They are typically written in a major key, and performed at around 120 beats per minute. Prussian style oom pah rhythm is heavily used, seen in the Presentation March and March Past of the People's Liberation Army. The most famous of Chinese marches is the March of the Volunteers, which is the national anthem of the People's Republic of China.

==== North Korea ====
North Korean marches are heavily influenced by the Soviet military band tradition mixed with Korean influences. Most of the marches are dedicated to the party and to their revolution and leaders. Use of a grandiose brass sound is almost always present in the music. Many marches are adapted from the North Korean revolutionary and patriotic song tradition, known as the taejung kayo genre. Among the more popular North Korean marches played during state ceremonies are:

- Victorious Military Parade
- Footsteps
- Song of the Korean People's Army
- Guerrillas' March
- Long Live Great General Kim Il-sung
- Defend with our lives the Supreme Commander
- Defending the Headquarters of Revolution
- Defending Kim Jong-un with our Lives
- Our Revolutionary Armed Forces Follows Only the Marshal
- Song of Guards Units' Pride
- Song of National Defense
- General of Korea
- Song of the Proclamation of the Democratic People's Republic
- Death to US Aggressors
- Look at Us
- July 27 March
- Song of the Coast Artillerymen

==== Turkey ====
Modern Turkey's national anthem is the march, "İstiklâl Marşı", which has an aggressive tune. Generally, old Turkish marches from the Ottoman Empire have aggressive lyrics, for instance in "Mehter Marşı". It is notable that Mozart and Beethoven also wrote popular Turkish marches. Modern marches played during ceremonies include the Atatürk March, played as the march-in and march-off piece of military bands in military parades and ceremonies.

==== Central Asia ====
External videos
- Audio of Nyýazow's Honour march on Youtube

Central Asian march traditions have spanned centuries and consists of many different military and national cultures. The main five Central Asian nations (Kazakhstan, Kyrgyzstan, Tajikistan, Turkmenistan, Uzbekistan) commonly utilize Russian military marches during state functions, although they have made much quicker efforts unlike their Ukrainian and Belarusian counterparts to distinguish their military traditions from Russia. Most Central Asian nations have a Turkic culture and therefore uses marches with a mix of Russian and Turkish traditions. Tajikistan is an outlier in that it has a more Persian musical tradition. Afghanistan, like Tajikistan, has military marches that are similar to those in Iran, but with more recent American and British influence in combination with the Russian tradition.

Some the more popular Central Asian marches are the following:

- March of Ablai Khan (Kazakhstan)
- Kirghiz March (Kyrgyzstan)
- Morşi Didor (Tajikistan)
- Nyýazow's Honour March (Turkmenistan)
- Slow March of the Turkmen Flag (Turkmenistan)
- Sunny March (Uzbekistan)
- Mustaqillik March (Uzbekistan)

=== Latin American march music ===
Although inspired by German, Spanish and French military music, marches of South and Central America are unique in melody and instrumentation.

==== Argentina ====
Argentine marches are inspired by its military history and the influx of European immigration in the 19th and 20th centuries. Cayetano Alberto Silva's "San Lorenzo march" is an example that combines German and French military musical influences. Other examples include the "Avenue of the Camelias" March and the March of the Malvinas, used during the Falklands War and in military parades and ceremonies.

==== Brazil ====
Brazilian military marches are popular called by the name "Dobrado", a reference to the most popular type of bar in this music genre, the 2/4. This type of music is influenced by the European and American march styles. Almost all states of Brazil have contributed to the growth of this tradition with a number of marches composed by local musicians, many of patriotic nature. Most popular composers are Antônio Manuel do Espírito Santo, with "Cisne Branco" (the official march of the Navy), "Avante Camaradas" e "Quatro Dias de Viagem" and Pedro Salgado, with "Dois corações" e "Coração de Mãe". Manoel Alves' "Batista de Melo" March, played widely in military and civil parades, while being the song of the Brazilian Army artillery and quartermaster services, is de facto the army's quick march past tune.

==== Colombia ====
Colombian military march music, like "The National Army of Colombia Hymn", "Commandos March" and "Hymn of the Colombian Navy" is an adaptation of the European and the American march styles.

==== Venezuela ====
Venezuela's "The Indio and the Conquistador" is the official marchpast of the Military Academy of Venezuela. It is more famous for being played in slow time in military parades and ceremonies. Also famous is the official double march of the National Armed Forces of Venezuela's special forces and airborne units, "Carabobo Reveille", and the "Slope Arms" March, played in ceremonies featuring the Flag of Venezuela and the first march in the beginning of parades. Marches like these (including the anthem of the 114th Armored Battalion "Apure Braves", "Fatherland Beloved") show British, American and Prussian influence.

==== Mexico ====
Mexican marches, like the "March of the Heroic Military College", "Airborne Fusiliers March", "National Defense March" and the "Viva Mexico March", are all inspired by American, Spanish, and French military music but have a faster beat. Some marches have direct French influence of bugle accompaniment during parades for infantry units, since the Mexican Armed Forces has always maintained drum and bugle bands at the unit level.

==== Cuba ====
Cuban military marches are inspired by both American, Spanish and Soviet military music. German military marches such as the Yorckscher Marsch and Preußens Gloria are commonly used by the Cuban Revolutionary Armed Forces Band during official functions such as military parades. A notable Cuban military march is the Hymn of July 26 (Himno del 26 de Julio). Other musical compositions include the Marcha de la alfabetización and the Marcha De La Revolución.

==== Peru ====
Other Latin American marches are inspired by both European and Native American influences, such as the Peruvian marches "Los peruanos Pasan" and "Sesquicentenario" and the Ecuadorian military march "Paquisha".

==== Chile ====
Marches from Chile are a mix of European march music especially the German march tradition, and many are locally composed. Los viejos estandartes, the official march of the Chilean Army, is one such example. Several German, British and French marches (and even the US march Semper Fidelis) are also used by military and civil bands in parades and ceremonies most especially during national holidays.

== See also ==
- Authorized marches of the Canadian Forces
- Drum cadence
- Heritage of the March
- Military cadence
- Martial music
- Classical music
