= C.L. Barnhouse =

C.L. Barnhouse may refer to:

- Charles Lloyd Barnhouse
- C. L. Barnhouse Company
