= Washington Post (disambiguation) =

The Washington Post is a daily newspaper published in Washington, D.C., United States.

Washington Post may also refer to:

- Graham Holdings Company (formerly The Washington Post Company), the former owners of the above newspaper
- "The Washington Post" (march), a march by John Philip Sousa
