= Guy Earl Holmes =

American musician and composer

Guy Earl Holmes (February 14, 1873 – February 10, 1945) was an American musician and composer. He was born in Baraboo, Wisconsin, and contributed much to the circus band repertoire. He spent 20 years on the faculty of VanderCook College of Music, and wrote over 200 marches and overtures, among other works.

He toured for over a decade with the Smith-Spring-Holmes Orchestral Quintet, with his wife Lotus Flower Spring (a cellist), her sister Coyla May Spring (a pianist and dramatic reader), and Coyla's musician husband Clay Smith, plus a violinist (several women filled that place over the years).

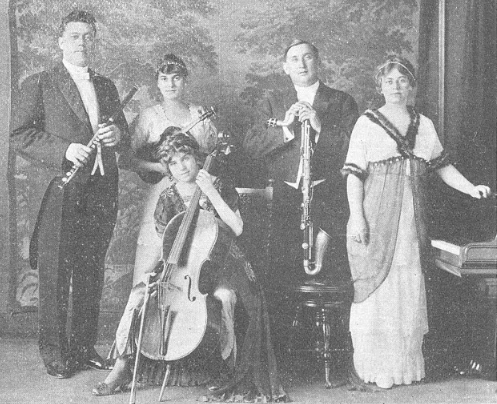
The Smith-Spring-Holmes Orchestral Quintet, from a 1915 publication.

He was featured on Volume 46 of the Heritage of the March recording series, and the Circus World Museum has a substantial collection of his work.
