= Althouse =

Althouse may refer to:

== People ==
- Adelbert Althouse (1869–1954), American naval officer and Governor of Guam
- Ann Althouse (born 1951), American law professor and blogger
- George W. Althouse (1895–1981), American politician from Nebraska
- Monroe Althouse (1853–1924), American composer and bandmaster
- Paul Althouse (1889–1954), American opera singer
- Valeyta Althouse (born 1974), American athlete
- Vic Althouse (born 1937), Canadian politician from Saskatchewan

== Places ==
- John G. Althouse Middle School
