= Roland F. Seitz =

Roland Forrest Seitz
- Roland F. Seitz from the 1902 book Popular American Composers by Frank L. Boyden.
- Born: June 14, 1867; Shrewsbury Township, York County, Pennsylvania, U.S.
- Died: December 29, 1946 (aged 79); Union City, New Jersey, U.S.
- Education: Dana Musical Institute
- Occupations: Composer, bandmaster, music publisher

"March Grandioso"
1909's "March Grandioso", composed by Seitz and played here by the U.S. Navy Band in 2006.

Roland Forrest Seitz (1867–1946) was an American composer, bandmaster, and music publisher. For his many march compositions he earned the sobriquet “The Parade Music Prince”.

== Early life and education ==
He was born Roland Forrest Seitz on June 14, 1867, on a farm in Shrewsbury Township near Glen Rock, Pennsylvania. He was the youngest of eight children of William and Magdalena Zeigler. Despite an early interest in music, Roland started work as a printer's apprentice at the weekly Glen Rock Item. He joined the family band performing on the flute; and then the Glen Rock Band performing first on the euphonium and then the cornet. In 1894 at age 27, Seitz enrolled in the Dana Musical Institute in Warren, Ohio. (Dana is now part of Youngstown State University). Roland graduated from Dana in 1898.

== Career ==
Seitz returned to Glen Rock to teach wind and percussion as well as perform in the town band and soon became their conductor. By 1901, under Seitz, the band was selected to perform at the Pan-American Exposition in Buffalo, New York.

Beginning with New York Journal published in 1897, Seitz composed nearly fifty marches. One of these marches, Grandioso (1901), is often featured in parades. Grandioso incorporates a theme from the fourteenth of Franz Liszt’s Hungarian Rhapsodies. Additional well-known marches include Brooke’s Chicago Marine Band (1901), Brooke’s Triumphal (1904), Salutation (1914), and University of Pennsylvania Band (1900). On November 21, 1930, John Philip Sousa conducted the University of Pennsylvania Band at the student quadrangle in Seitz's march for the band. Afterwards, Sousa said: "That is one of the best band marches, aside from my own productions, I have ever conducted".

Seitz also opened a music publishing business in Glen Rock. His catalog included compositions by many famous march composers including W. Paris Chambers, Harold Josiah Crosby, Charles E. Duble, Frank H. Losey, George Rosenkrans, and Charles Sanglea. In 1908, Seitz became the first to publish seventeen-year-old Karl L. King’s compositions. Roland’s company was purchased by Southern Music in 1964.

Seitz married Mattie A. in 1902. They had two children, Charlotte J. (1904-1999) and Nevin H. Seitz (1906-2003). Roland Seitz retired to live with his daughter Charlotte J. Zelley in Union City, New Jersey in 1944. He died age 79 from a heart attack there on December 29, 1946.

"Grandioso" (or "March Grandioso") is played by both the University of Texas "Showband of the Southwest" and the Texas Tech "Goin' Band from Raiderland" at every home football game of both teams. The song is also played by "The Pride of All Nebraska" Cornhusker Marching Band at home football games in the pregame show.
