= Chicago Tribune March =

American march by William Paris Chambers

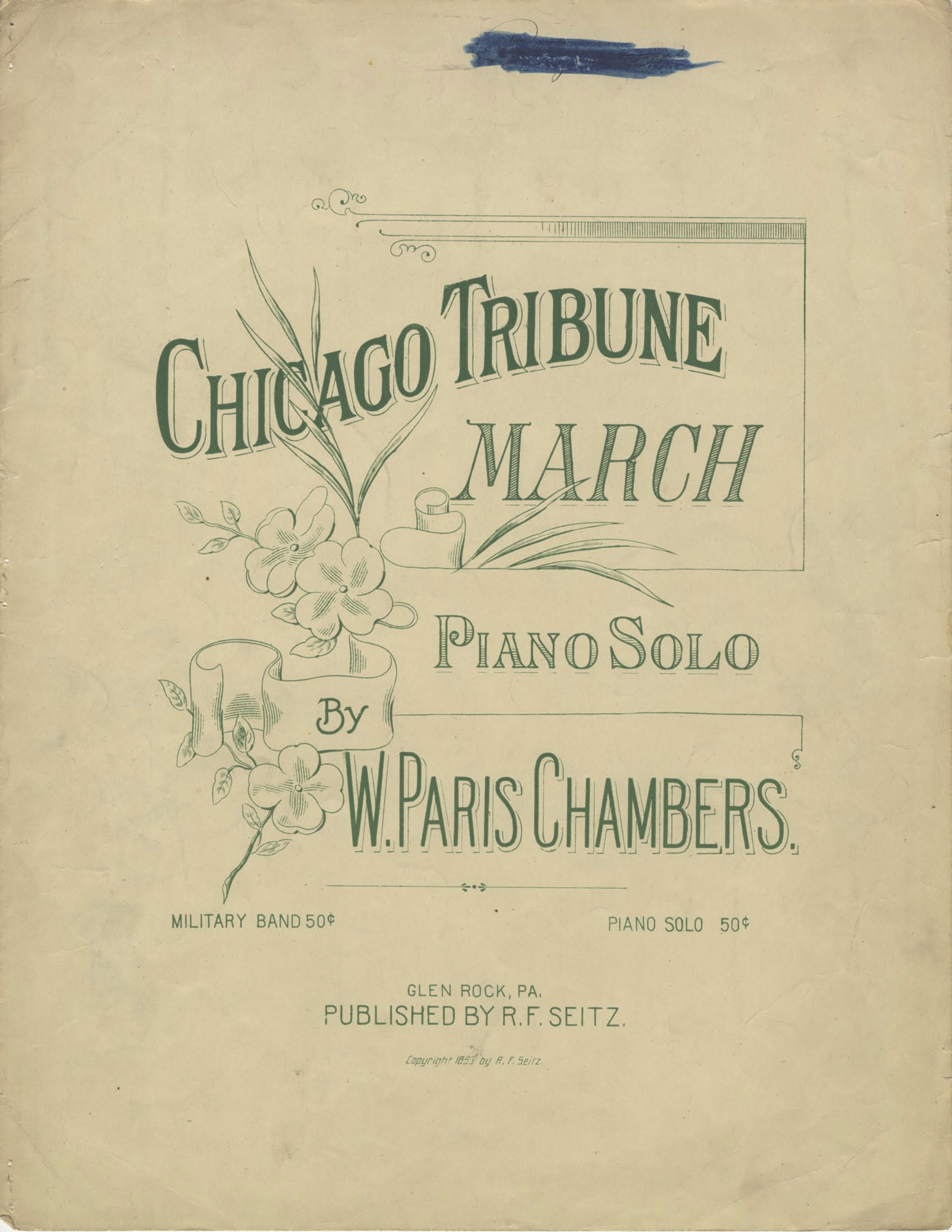
- Piano arrangement of the march 1893.
- Year: 1892
- Dedication: Named after the Chicago Tribune newspaper
- Published: 1892 in Glen Rock, PA
- Publisher: R.F. Seitz

Audio sample
- The U.S. Air Force Band of the Rockies performing the march in 1998.: file; help

"Chicago Tribune March" is an American march by William Paris Chambers, composed in 1892 and published by R. F. Seitz the same year. The march was written for the Chicago Tribune newspaper and was first performed in September 1892 during "Music Day" at the Illinois State Fair.

== History ==
Paris wrote the march in 1892 "for the iconic Chicago newspaper company," and it was first performed at "Music Day" at the Illinois State Fair in Peoria on Friday, September 30, 1892. The march was published in 1892 by R. F. Seitz, and an arrangement for piano was published in 1893; the march has been described as Chambers' "most popular march," a "distinctive" piece with "skillful interplay between melody and countermelody," along with "brilliant running woodwind parts."

The Chicago Tribune newspaper reported on music day at the state fair, describing how four of the best bands in Illinois, in addition to a chorus of 100, were participating. The four bands entered an arena for the first event of the day, a "March of the Nations," with "music, 'soldiery' and colors representing France, Germany, Great Britain and the United States." The bands then performed "America" with a chorus accompaniment, with "all four bands and chorus" joining "together in unison to perform the last stanza." After this, all "four bands then formed again" in front of the grandstand and made the first performance of "Chicago Tribune March" to "great applause."

== See also ==
- W. Paris Chambers
- American march music
- "The Washington Post" (march)
