= W. Paris Chambers =

American composer and bandmaster

William Paris Chambers
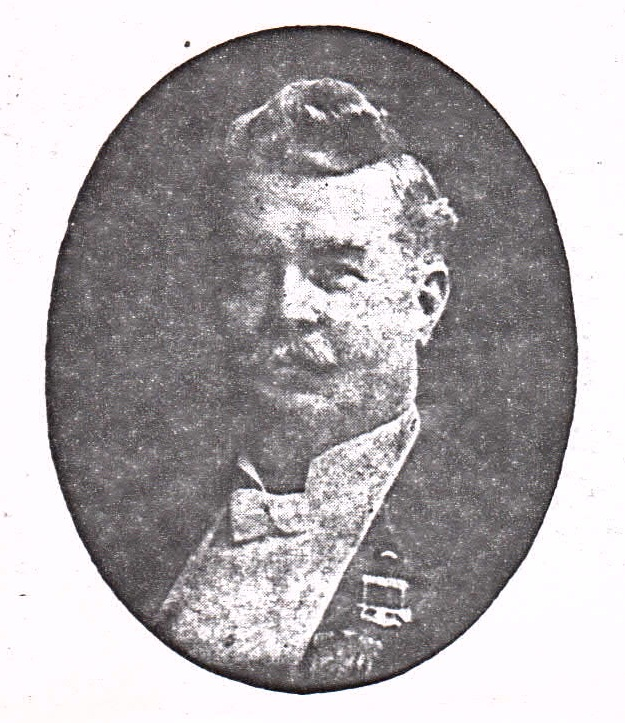
- William Paris Chambers as pictured above his endorsement letter in the Summer 1909 edition of the Frank Holton Company's Harmony Hints

Background information
- Born: William Paris Chambers; November 1, 1854; Newport, Pennsylvania, United States
- Died: November 13, 1913 (aged 59) Newville, Pennsylvania
- Genres: Concert Band
- Occupations: Cornetist, composer
- Instrument: Cornet
- Years active: 1870 - 1913
- Labels: Edison, Berliner, Zonophone and Victor Talking Machine

Sweeney's Cavalcade (1902)
Sweeney's Cavalcade, composed by William Paris Chambers; performed by the U.S. Air Force Concert Band

William Paris Chambers (November 1, 1854 – November 13, 1913) was an American composer, cornet soloist, and bandmaster of the late 19th century.

== Life and career ==
William Paris Chambers was born in Newport, Pennsylvania but spent most of his early years in Newville, Pennsylvania. It was in Newville that he studied music, quickly becoming a proficient performer on the cornet, which he began to study around age thirteen. By the age of eighteen he was conducting the Keystone Cornet Band. At the age of twenty-five, he conducted the Capital City Band of Harrisburg, Pennsylvania. He was also given credit for bringing the Chambersburg and Martinsburg bands into statewide fame.

Between 1887 and 1893 he conducted the Great-Southern Band of Baltimore, Maryland. While on a tour with the Great-Southern in 1892 Chambers demonstrated his stamina and skill with the cornet with a solo performed from the 14,500 foot summit of Pike's Peak.

At the turn of the century, Chambers managed the C.G. Conn store in the city of New York, performing impromptu on the cornet for the customers, including fellow cornet virtuosi. His forte was a phenomenally high register ascending to the third high C. He liked to tell his store audience: “It is all really very simple; all you have to do is to develop the muscle in and around the lips, by long hours of the right kind of practice, and anyone can do the same things I do on the cornet.”

He was regularly featured in cornet solos with Francesco Fanciulli's Seventy-First Regiment Band on the mall at Central Park.

In 1905–1906 he performed cornet solos in Europe and Africa, accompanied by his own band of musicians. One of his favorite concert tricks was to hold the cornet inverted during difficult solos, pushing the valves up instead of down and with the backs of his fingers and maintaining correct tempo. He would sometimes perform on the cornet with the bell touching his right ear.

In 1906, he performed for Jules Massenet in Paris. The famous French composer was averse to the cornet, but he relented and accompanied Chambers in his own Élégie Op. 5, No. 10 and afterward complimented Chambers on his performance, saying: “I have just composed a little song, Je t'aime!, which ought to make a fine effect on the cornet when performed by an artist like yourself.” Massenet played the piece on the piano and then Chambers performed the work on the cornet.

Chambers filed for bankruptcy in the United States District Court for the Southern District of New York on October 28, 1908.

On February 20, 1910, he performed on the cornet (his wife accompanying him on piano) at the Maine Memorial Service for the United Spanish War Veterans at Carnegie Hall in New York.

In 1912, Chambers formed the municipal band in Atlantic City, New Jersey. He returned to Newville, Pennsylvania and while trying to rebuild his health he also rebuilt the band there. W. Paris Chambers died in Newville in 1913 and is buried in Prospect Hill Cemetery.

Amongst his famous cornet students were Frederick Otis Currier (1872–1921), B. Frank Maurer (1870–?), and Al Sweet (1876–1945).

== Compositions and recordings ==
"The Chicago Tribune"
Performed by the United States Air Force Band of the Rockies

Chambers wrote several cornet solos and nearly ninety marches. His most widely known works include The Boys of the Old Brigade (unrelated to the Irish republican song of the same name) and Chicago Tribune, both marches. His compositions have been called “some of the finest and most difficult works in the American march repertoire.”

Chambers's compositions were published by John Church, Harry Coleman, Carl Fischer Music, J. W. Pepper and Son, Roland F. Seitz, Southern Music, E. F. Kalmus, and Wingert-Jones Music.

Chambers was the earliest artist to record the cornet on disc, for Berliner. He performed on Edison and Berliner records (in the 1890s) and on Zonophone (in 1901). Several of his works were performed on Victor records.

== List of works ==
=== Marches ===
- The Boys of the Old Brigade (1901)
- Buffalo Bill's Equestrian (1903)
- Chicago Tribune (1892)
- Comrades Return (1902)
- Detroit Free Press (1897)
- Hostrauser's (1896)
- King of Terror (1892)
- Marche Religioso (1895)
- Northwind (1895)
- St. Andrew's March (1902)
- Sweeney's Cavalcade (1902)
- Trombone Section (1886)
- General Felix Agnus March (1882)
- On Dress Parade(?)
- Through The Line ()

=== Cornet Solos ===
- Commodore Polka (1896)
- Kryl's Favorite
- Narcissus
- Nelly Gray with Variations
- The Seraph (189-)
