= United States Armed Forces Bicentennial Band =

The United States Armed Forces Bicentennial Band was a music ensemble composed of members of all branches of the United States military and some musicians selected from music schools across the country. The band toured the United States, Canada, and Mexico to celebrate the United States Bicentennial. The program was sponsored by the Department of Defense and headquartered at the army base in Fort Meade, Maryland.

Under the direction of Hal J. Gibson, the 67-piece band and an accompanying 24-voice mixed chorus performed a variety of selections representing different genres, generations, and regions. The band premiered at the John F. Kennedy Center for the Performing Arts on March 24, 1975. The band was dissolved in late 1976.

In addition to touring, the band was recorded for Volume 25 of the Heritage of the March LP series.
