= Hermann Ludwig Blankenburg =

German composer (1876–1956)

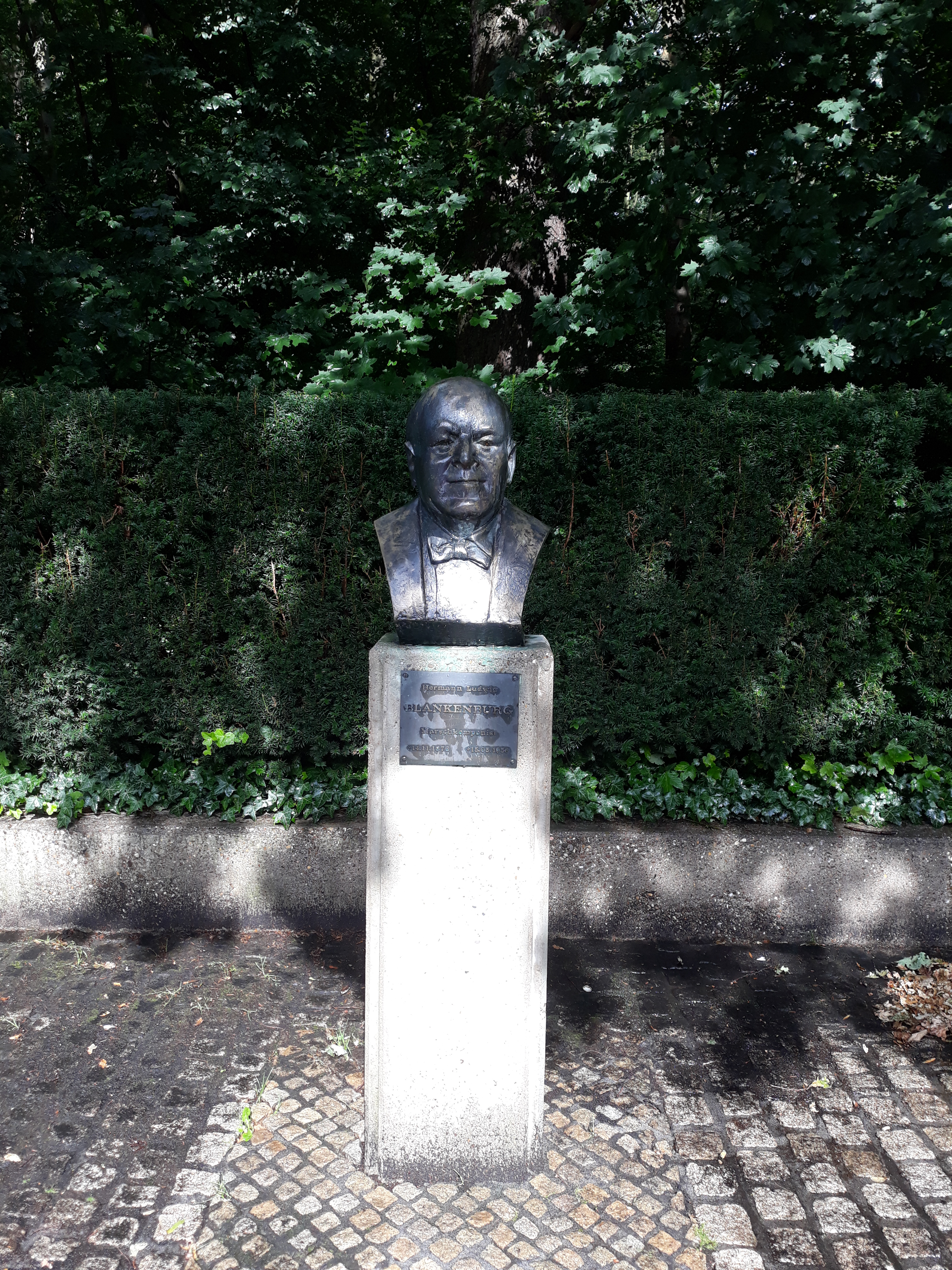
- Büste Hermann Ludwig Blankenburg
- Born: November 14, 1876
- Died: May 15, 1956 (aged 79); Wesel
- Occupation: Composer

Hermann Ludwig Blankenburg (14 November 1876 in Thamsbrück – 15 May 1956 in Wesel) was a German composer of military marches.

Blankenburg was the only son of three children of Johann Heinrich and Ernestine Friederike Koch Blankenburg. He was born with the middle name Louis but changed it to Ludwig later in life perhaps as a connection to Beethoven. Raised on a sheep farm in Thamsbrücke, he was expected to manage the farm someday. However, he showed a propensity for music starting with performing on the piccolo – a favorite instrument his entire life. His family agreed on his studying music as long as he promised to serve in the army for twelve years.

Blankenburg taught himself to play various instruments including bassoon, tuba, and violin and he conducted his school orchestra at the age of ten. He served actively in the military for two years (1896–1898), playing tuba in the band of the 6th Field Artillery Regiment in Breslau. After that his only service was prior to and during the early years of World War I in reserve bands. He played tuba in the band of Field Artillery Regiment No. 43 in Wesel from 1913 until 1915, when he got a medical discharge. He remained in Wesel for the rest of his life.

Blankenburg played in and conducted community bands as well as performing in the orchestras in Dortmund, Wuppertal, and Duisburg. He also worked as a bricklayer and a policeman for a short time. His personal life was full of turmoil. In 1917 he was arrested by the military police from his former regiment for "deserting his family". He had married Magdalena Weidmann in Germersheim in 1898. In 1920 he married Käthe Trauthoff and was then arrested for bigamy.

== Blankenburg's March Compositions ==
In 1904, a march he had written years before was submitted to a Hawkes & Son march competition. Hawkes chose Blankenburg's march as the winner, from over 500 submitted, with the proviso the title be changed from "Deutschlands Fürsten" (Germany's Princes) to "Abschied der Gladiatoren" (The Gladiators' Farewell). The march became popular, and Hawkes (also Boosey & Hawkes) would publish several more of Blankenburg's compositions, including "Adlerflug", "Festjubel", "Territorial", and "Mein Regiment" (the latter said to be the composer's own favorite march).

In the 1920s and 30s Blankenburg's marches attained European fame. Instead of accepting commissions, he composed marches when inspired. After World War II his compositional efforts dropped off. Despite the military titles of many of his marches and his short military band service, Blankenburg's compositions were never accorded official recognition by Germany's military authorities.

Blankenburg is likely the most prolific march composer in history. For twenty years he composed at least one march a week. His one thousandth march was composed in 1928: "Der Tausendkünstler" (Jack of All Trades), dedicated to fellow composer Paul Lincke. He continued to compose marches until 1948. Blankenburg numbered his march compositions at 1,328, but he was careless in assigning opus numbers or in completing compositions. He also renamed some older marches with new titles. The highest known opus number is 1275 (the march "Semper Paratus" likely published in 1936) and the lowest is 9 (for "Fliegerhelden Marsch"). There are long gaps in the sequence of opus numbers and many marches have no opus number assigned.

At least 300 of his marches were published (by thirty different publishers), but many more are lost or destroyed. Over 100 of Blankenburg's marches were recorded in the Heritage of the March series.

His marches are all in the characteristic German style. He was fond of soaring euphonium countermelodies, which require a highly competent euphonium section prepared to perform in the upper register of the instrument. His marches also stress the piccolo, clarinet, and cornet sections.

A few months before his 81st birthday, Blankenburg intended to compose another march, but he died in Wesel in 1956 before completing the piece.

Opinions vary on the quality of his marches. Composer and arranger Gay Corrie has said it is difficult to tell his marches apart but found the euphonium countermelodies and woodwind figures admirable. Commander Charles Brendler of the United States Navy Band 1942-1962 considered him the greatest march writer who ever lived.

At the age of 60, he was made an honorary citizen of Thamsbrück. In 1976, Wesel changed the name of the street where he lived from Gartenstraße to Blankenburgstraße to commemorate the 100th anniversary of his birth. There is also a street in the community of Haldern in Rees, Germany named for the composer.

== Marches include ==
- "Abschied der Gladiatoren" (The Gladiators´ Farewell; originally titled Deutschlands Fürsten)
- "Adlerflug" (The Eagle's Flight)
- "Germanentreue" (Germanic Loyalty)
- "Gruss an Thüringen" (Greetings to Thuringia)
- "Klar zum Gefecht" (Ready for Battle)
- "Frühlingskinder" (Children of Springtime)
- "Treue Waffengefahrten" (Loyal Comrades)
- "Unter Kaisers Fahnen" (Under the Emperor's Banner)
