= Coyla May Spring =

American dramatic reader and musician

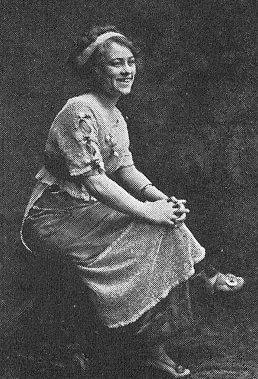
- Coyla May Spring, from a 1915 publication.
- Born: November 4, 1889; Illinois, U.S.
- Died: November 1, 1978 (aged 88); California, U.S.
- Other names: Coyla Spring, Coyla Mae Spring, Coyla Spring Smith, Coyla Mitchener
- Occupations: Elocutionist, actress, singer, dramatic reader

Coyla May Spring (November 4, 1889 – November 1, 1978) was an American dramatic reader, singer, and pianist, on the Chautauqua circuit and the lyceum platform.

== Early life ==
Coyla May Spring was the daughter of Joseph Spring and Selena Spring of Illinois. She studied at the Chicago Conservatory of Dramatic Art and the Columbia School of Expression.

== Career ==
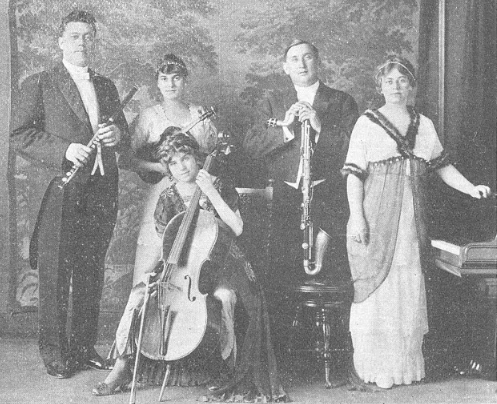
The Smith-Spring-Holmes Orchestral Quintet, from a 1915 publication. The women in the photo are Coyla May Spring (piano), Lotus Flower Spring (cello), and Freida Bethig (violin); the men in the photograph are Clay Smith and Guy E. Holmes. (Various other women played violin in the group in later seasons.)

Coyla May Spring was a dramatic reader, pianist, and singer, performing musical and spoken works on the Chautauqua circuit and lyceum platform. Her repertoire included character pieces, in which she used accents or childlike voices. She toured as a solo performer in 1913, and with the Apollo Concert Company. She led her own Coyla May Spring Concert Company. and was a longtime member of the Smith-Spring-Holmes Orchestral Quintet. Her sister, Lotus Flower Spring, was a cellist in her ensemble. The sisters sometimes sang together as part of the program. Spring's husband, Clay Smith, wrote some of her readings and "pianologues".

Spring was the subject of a poetic tribute in 1913:

And last of all, but not the least, is charming Coyla Spring,

You think for sure that 'Spring has come' when Coyla starts to sing.

Her voice just bubbles as it flows, from off her rippling tongue,

She is the fairest 'Coil o' Spring' that ever yet was sprung.

Her eyes just sparkle with delight, each move is one of grace,

She has a charm of figure, and a winsome girlish face,

And in between the numbers, when the quartet rings and toots,

Doth Coyla charm her hearers, as she coyly elocutes.

— Edwin Weeks, "Coyla May Spring"

In the 1920s, Spring sang on radio programs. After Smith's death in 1930, Coyla and Lotus Spring continued performing together, sometimes with other women musicians. In 1944 she renewed the copyright to several songs written by Clay Smith for a revue called Cheep, with titles such as "I Shall See You Tonight", "If It's In John Bull It Is So", "Somebody's Coming to Tea", "At the Calico Ball", and "Oh, My Lily of Killarney". Coyla Spring was living in Los Angeles and still performing in 1948. In 1949, she renewed the copyright on two more songs by Clay Smith, "The Deers" and "Miracles".

== Personal life ==
Coyla May Spring was married to musician, composer, and journalist Clay Smith in 1915; on the same day, her sister Lotus married musician and composer Guy E. Holmes. The four lived together in Chicago and toured together in their quintet. Clay Smith died in 1930. Coyla May Spring married again, to Canadian tenor Theodore Mitchener; she lived in Culver City, California, in 1955. She died in California in 1978, aged 88 years.
