= James M. Fulton =

Composer and arranger

James Melville Fulton (1873–1940) was a composer, arranger, conductor, and music educator best known for composing marches. He is often associated with the traditional British melody Garry Owen which he arranged for band in 1903. His most recognized march is Associated Press, published in 1897. His more than 245 compositions include more than 144 marches (more than Sousa) as well as many waltzes, polkas, overtures, schottisches, reveries, and cakewalks.

Fulton was born in Washington, Pennsylvania and studied violin, cornet, euphonium, and tuba as a youth. He played cornet for orchestras and bands, eventually becoming the conductor of the Waite Dramatic Company Band and music director for the Hotel Rudolf in Atlantic City, New Jersey. Starting in 1899, Fulton led the American Band from Waterbury, Connecticut and changed its name to "Fulton's American Band." He would later organize his own music publishing company and serve as music director for Fenway Theatre in Boston. His was conductor for the Waltham Watch Company Band for 13 years. He died of a heart attack in Belmont, Massachusetts in 1940 while preparing the Belmont VFW Band for another state championship.

Family: Fulton was married to M Margaret Sprow on August 9, 1893, and had a daughter named Alga N Fulton (b.April 22, 1893). They divorced on March 6, 1903.

He married Edith Hoxie on May 2, 1904.

He married Catherine S. Fulton (?) (d.1971) and they are both buried in an unmarked grave at the Mount Auburn Cemetery in Cambridge Massachusetts.
