= Großwelsbach =

- Ortsteil of Bad Langensalza
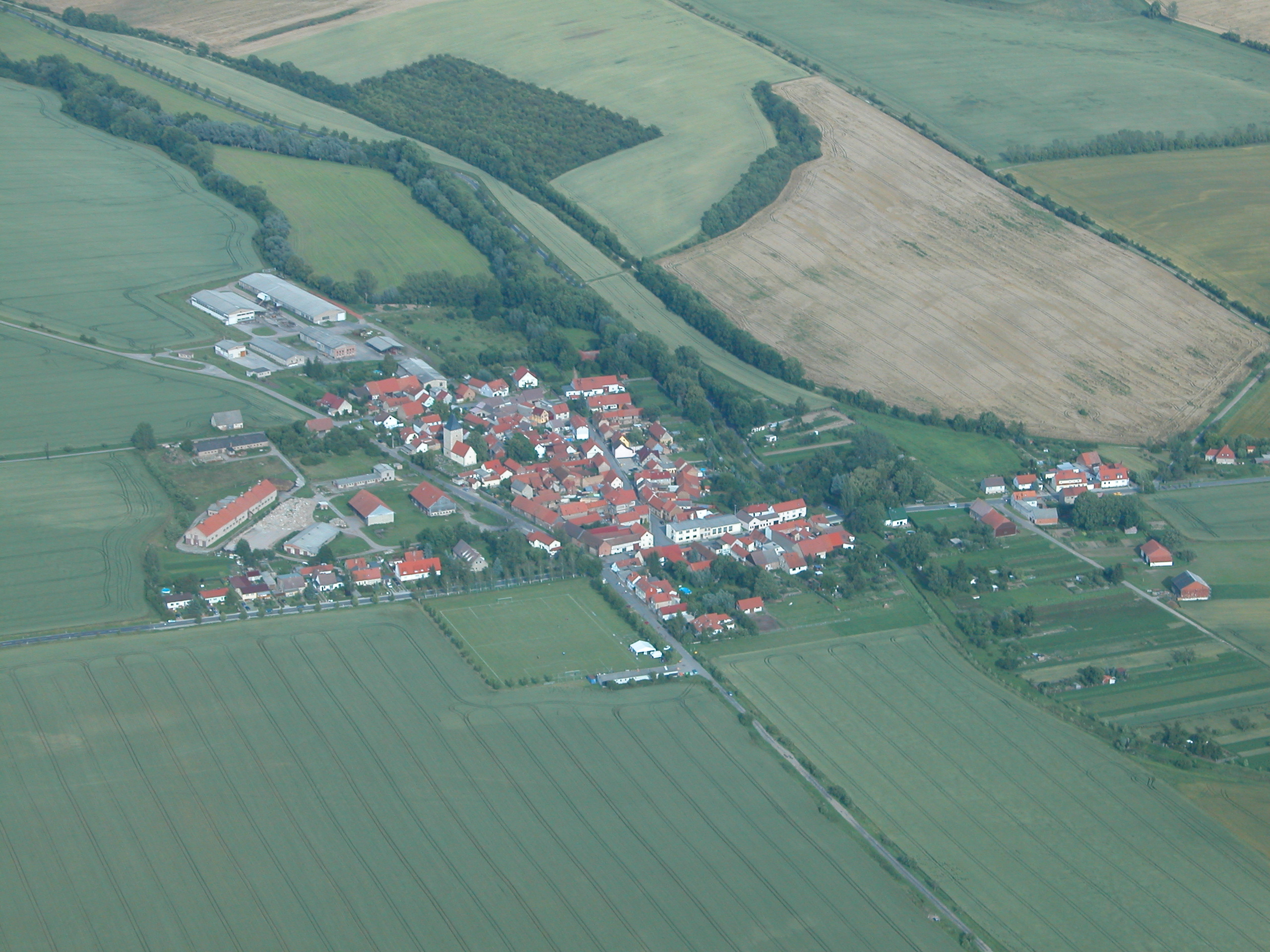
- Aerial view

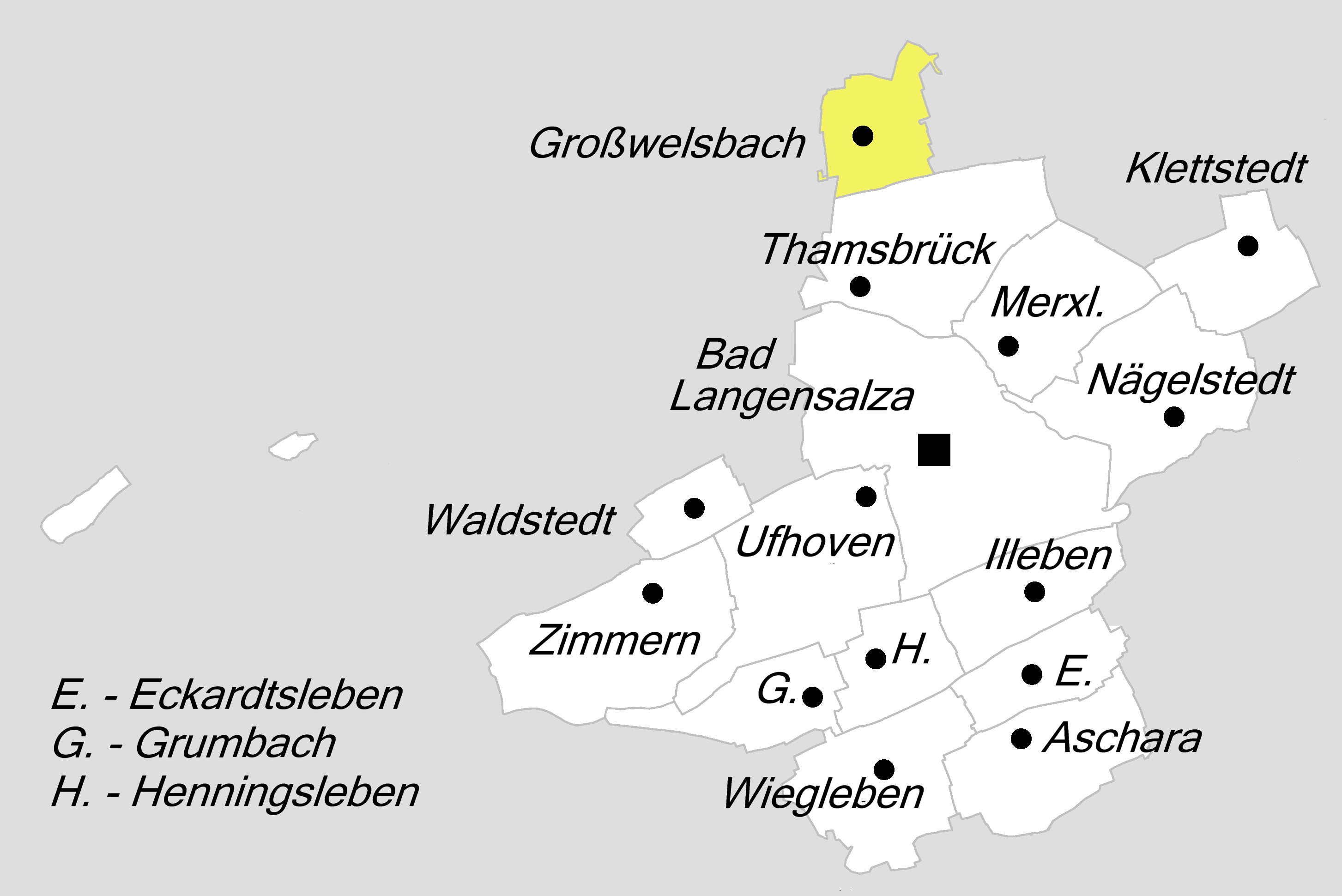
- Location of Großwelsbach within Bad Langensalza
- Interactive map of Großwelsbach
- Location within Germany Location within Thuringia
- Coordinates: 51°10′7″N 10°38′7″E
- Country: Germany
- State: Thuringia
- District: Unstrut-Hainich-Kreis
- Town: Bad Langensalza
- First mentioned: 1195

Government
  - Mayor: Horst-Günter Aurin

Area
  - Total: 5.02 km^{2} (1.94 sq mi)
- Elevation: 235 m (771 ft)

Population (2020-12-31)
  - Total: 253
  - Density: 50.4/km^{2} (131/sq mi)
- Time zone: UTC+01:00 (CET)
  - Summer (DST): UTC+02:00 (CEST)
- Postal codes: 99947
- Dialling codes: 036043
- Website: badlangensalza.de

Großwelsbach (pronounced [gʁoːsˈvl̩sbax]) is a village and an Ortsteil (part) of the town of Bad Langensalza in Thuringia, central Germany, with about 250 inhabitants.

== Geography ==
Großwelsbach is situated 8.4 kilometres (5.2 mi) north of Bad Langensalza on the Landesstraße (state road) 1031 near the Unstrut river in an agricultural area. There is hardly any forest in the intensively used flat-wavy landscape. The climate is mild and has low precipitation, with soils mostly close to groundwater. The village is crossed by the eponymous Welsbach stream, which comes from Kleinwelsbach and flows into the mill-operating Alte Unstrut 3.4 kilometres (2.1 mi) further south of the village near Thamsbrück.

== History ==
The village was first mentioned in a document in 1195 or 1216. The settlement is a church village of a former knight's estate. The Gernrode Abbey once had a nunnery here, which is why there were already large agricultural areas in the village in past centuries. Hans (von) Berlepsch acquired the nunnery estate at that time, and the family owned the property for a long period. The manor, long owned by the von Berlepsch family, was badly damaged by fire in 1655. The subsequent reconstruction dragged on until 1820. In 1910, Karl Wilhelm Schmidt acquired the estate and it remained in his family's possession until expropriation in 1945. The manor house was a simple Neoclassical building. It was almost completely demolished in 1945 in the course of Order 209 of the Soviet Military Administration in Germany. The last evidence of the former estate is the Late-Gothic squat round tower on the road to Kleinwelsbach.

Until 1815, Großwelsbach belonged to the Amt (district of) Langensalza in the Electorate of Saxony and, after its cession to Prussia, from 1816 to 1944 to the Landkreis (district of) Langensalza in the Province of Saxony.

Großwelsbach was incorporated into Bad Langensalza on 1 January 1994.

== Culture and sights ==
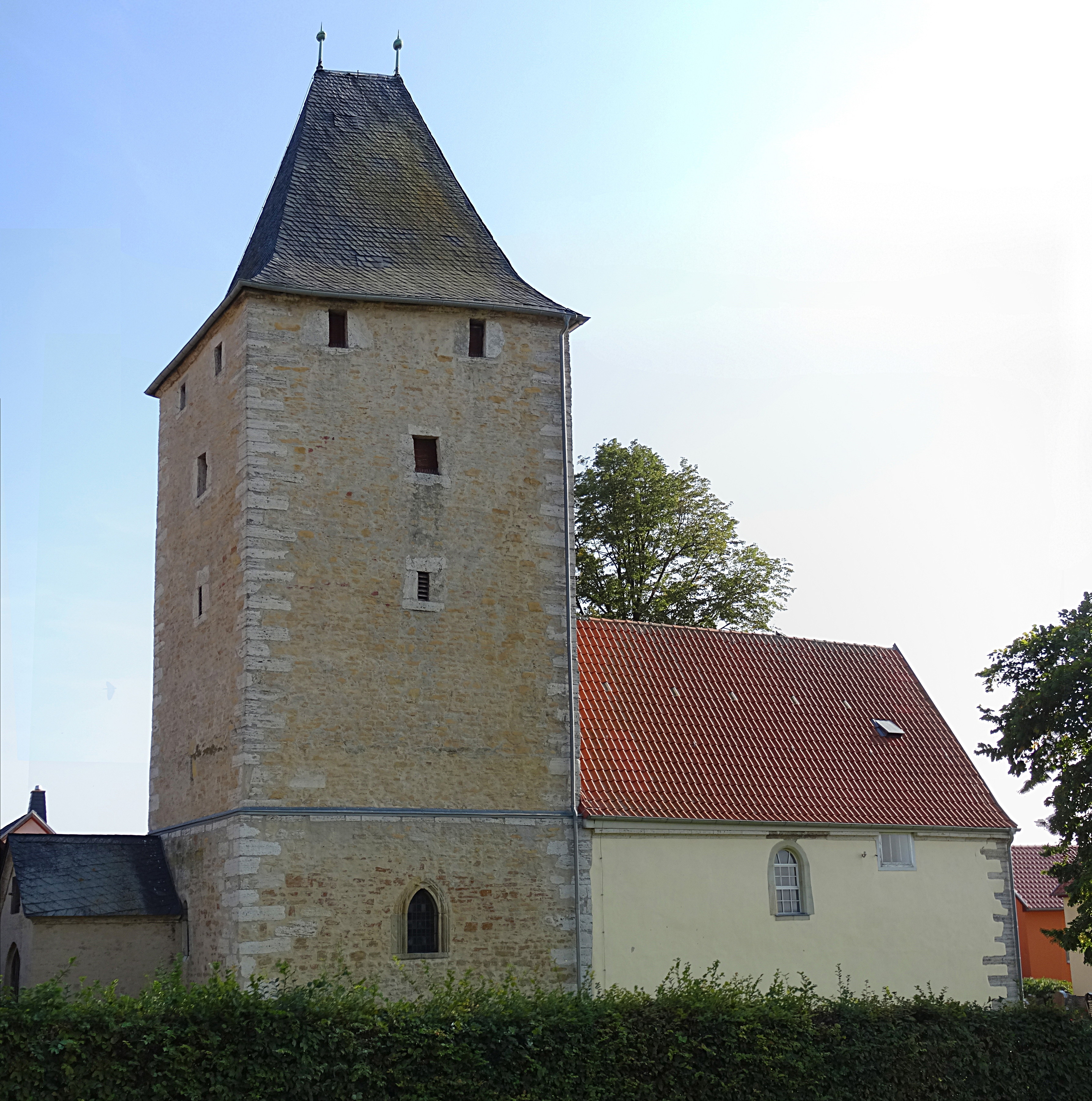
St Blaise's Church

St Blaise's Church (German: St. Blasii) was built of Grenzdolomit; the massive tower, which was also erected as a fortified tower, bears the year 1503 written in Gothic majuscules.
