= Hale A. VanderCook =

Hale Ascher VanderCook
- Born: September 3, 1864; Ann Arbor, Michigan
- Died: October 16, 1949 (aged 85); Allegan, Michigan
- Known for: VanderCook College of Music

Hale Ascher VanderCook (3 September 1864 – 16 October 1949) was a composer, conductor, and cornetist best known for his marches and brass solos. He was born in Ann Arbor, Michigan and began composing at the age of sixteen. He was performing in bands by the age of 14, and became conductor of the J.H. LaPearl Circus Band in 1891. He conducted circus and theater bands for much of the 1890s. VanderCook composed over 70 marches as well as numerous series for solo brass instruments. Among his most famous marches are American Stride, Olevine, Pacific Fleet, Pageant of Columbia and S.S. Theodore Roosevelt. He published his Course in Band and Orchestra Directing in 1916. VanderCook studied cornet with Frank Holton and A.F. Weldon. He founded VanderCook College of Music (originally called VanderCook Cornet School) in 1909. VanderCook composed scores of student-level solo works for the cornet and other brass instruments, often grouped into topical sets such as the Trumpet Stars (Arcturus, Orion, Vega, etc.), birds (The Warbler, The Starling, The Meadowlark, etc.) and flowers (Columbine, Peony, Chrysanthemum, etc.). Many of the solos were included in the curriculum of his mail order cornet course, and he wrote detailed pedagogical narratives that accompany each work. Many of his cornet solos are still in print, and extensive archival material by VanderCook can be found at the Ruppel Library at VanderCook College of Music in Chicago. VanderCook also published his Method for Cornet in 20 Lessons in 1922. VanderCook died in Allegan, Michigan on October 16, 1949. Three volumes of the Heritage of the March series are dedicated to his work.
