= Under blågul fana =

"Under blågul fana" (English: Beneath the Blue and Yellow Banner) is a Swedish march from the early 20th century, composed by Viktor Widqvist (1881–1952). Its date of composition is unknown, but the oldest known version (from the archive of the Royal Swedish Navy Band in Stockholm) dates from 1916. It became popular during World War II in Sweden and is its de facto national march. It was adopted as the march of the Swedish Armed Forces in 1999. It is quoted in Leroy Anderson's arrangement of Seventy-Six Trombones.
