= Thamsbrück =

- Ortsteil of Bad Langensalza
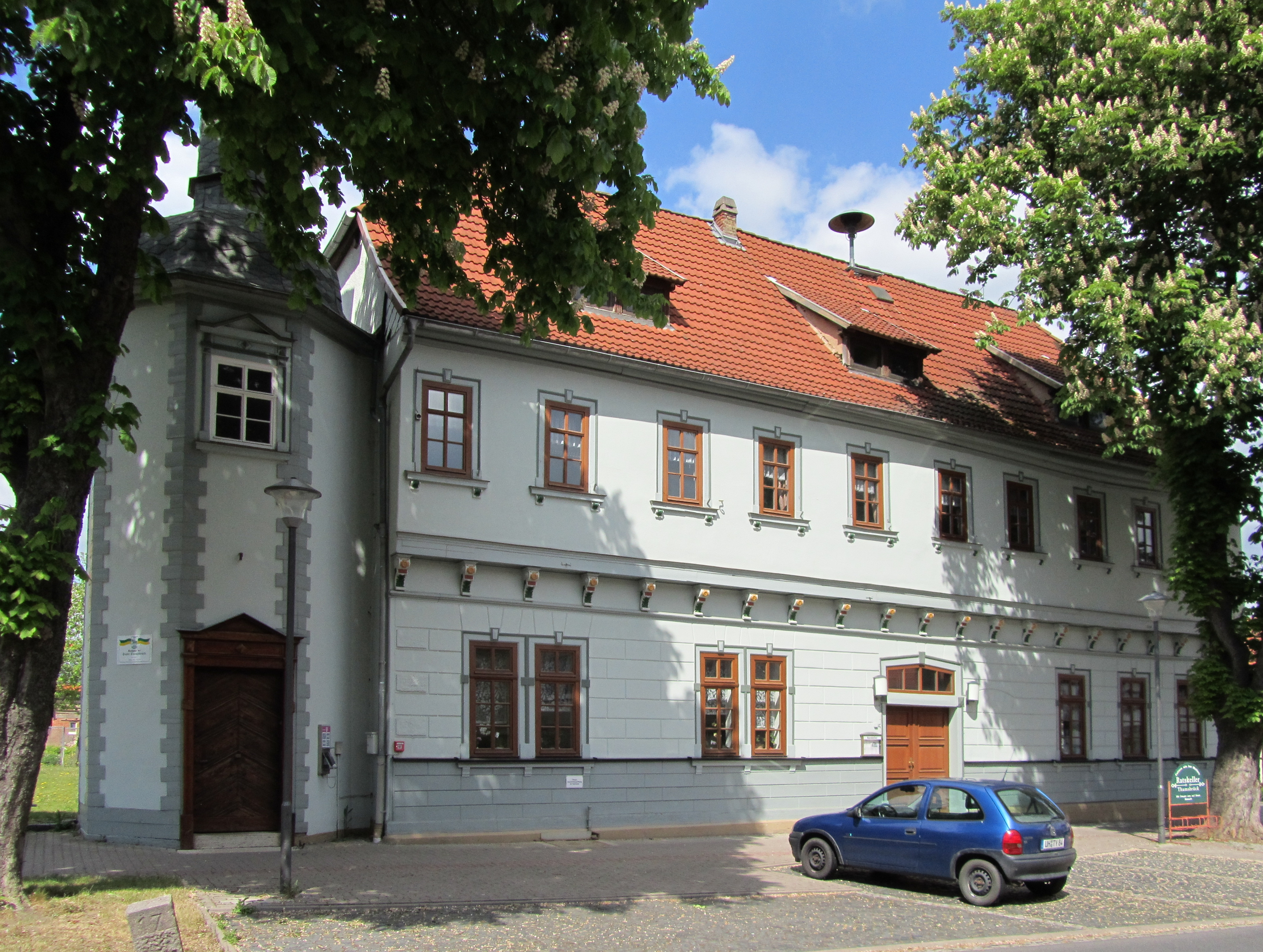
- Town hall at the market

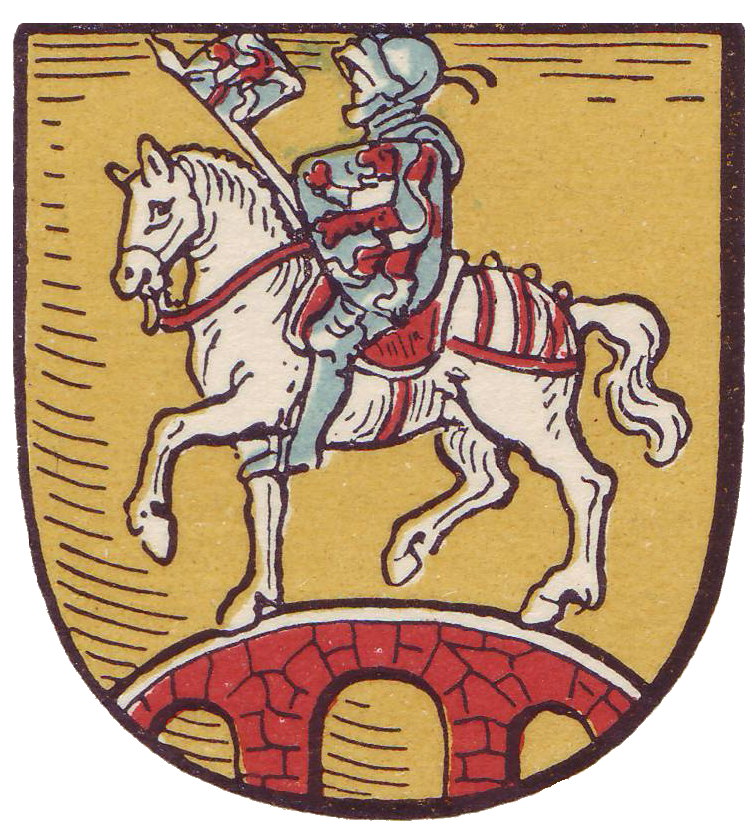
- Coat of arms

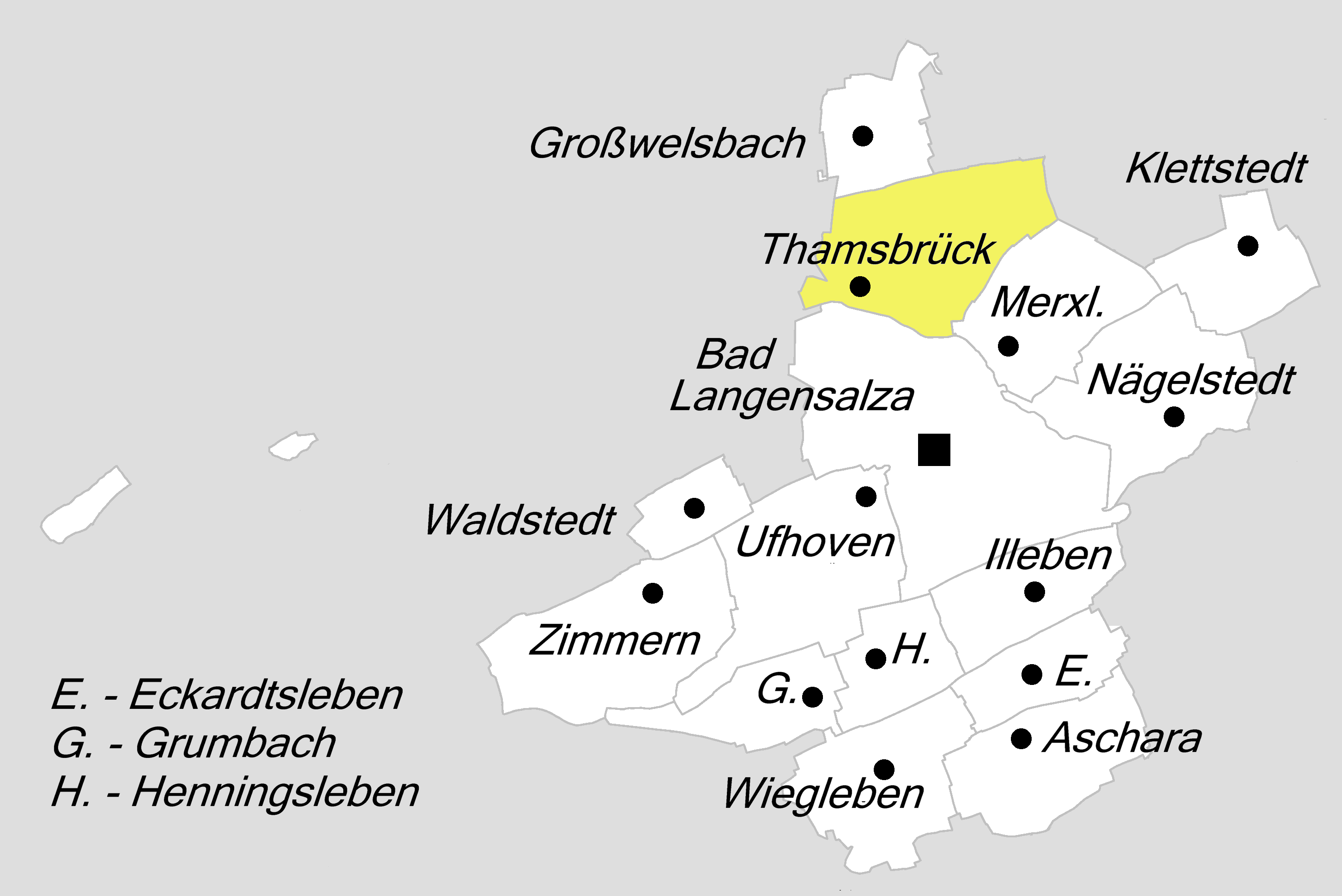
- Thamsbrück within Bad Langensalza
- Interactive map of Thamsbrück
- Location within Germany Location within Thuringia
- Coordinates: 51°08′20.76″N 10°38′11.399″E
- Country: Germany
- State: Thuringia
- District: Unstrut-Hainich-Kreis
- Town: Bad Langensalza
- First mentioned: 736

Government
  - Mayor: Björn Goldmann

Area
  - Total: 12.55 km^{2} (4.85 sq mi)
- Elevation: 183 m (600 ft)

Population (2020-12-31)
  - Total: 940
  - Density: 75/km^{2} (190/sq mi)
- Time zone: UTC+01:00 (CET)
  - Summer (DST): UTC+02:00 (CEST)
- Postal codes: 99947
- Dialling codes: 03603
- Website: badlangensalza.de

Thamsbrück (pronounced [ˈtamsbʁʏk], in German also Ablassstadt Thamsbrück ["Indulgence town Thamsbrück"]) is a quarter of the town of Bad Langensalza in Thuringia, central Germany, about 35 kilometres (22 mi) northwest of Erfurt, with 940 inhabitants. The town, which has been independent since 1206, was incorporated into Bad Langensalza in 1994.

Thamsbrück is the oldest small town in Thuringia and, with the Indulgence Festival (Ablassfest), has a tradition of more than 500 years.

== Geography ==
Thamsbrück is located in the west of the Thuringian Basin about 4 kilometres (2.5 mi) north of Bad Langensalza at an altitude of 175 metres (574 ft) above NHN. The surrounding area is agricultural. On the southern and western edge of the village, the Unstrut, with two river courses, flows eastwards to the Saale. The Welsbach, which comes from the north, flows into the Unstrut on the north-west side of the village.

== History ==
Thamsbrück was first mentioned in a document in 736. It describes that the church in Thamsbrück was founded by the Anglo-Saxon missionary Boniface. In 1149, Louis the Iron had a castle built on the hill in front of the Unstrut river for his brother Louis the Younger. In 1206, Thamsbrück was documented in a deed of donation by Landgrave Hermann I and named civitas (Latin for "town") when a Mühlhausen arbitration award was confirmed. This is generally regarded as the first mention of the town charter. Until 1490, Thamsbrück Castle formed the centre of a landgravial office, then it was absorbed into the Langensalza office. On 20 June 1500, 30 Thamsbrückers returned from a campaign against rebellious Frisians who had risen up against the Gubernator of Friesland, the Wettin Henry the Pious.

Until 1815, Thamsbrück belonged to the Electorate of Langensalza, and after it was ceded to Prussia, from 1816 to 1944 it belonged to the district of Langensalza in the province of Saxony. In 1868, Thamsbrück Castle was demolished and the area, including the moat, was turned into a garden. The castle tower, however, was spared. Anno 1890 saw the founding of the "Schloss Thamsbrück" malt factory.

A town portrait published in 1975 mentions the agricultural production cooperative (LPG) "Karl Marx", which was united with a part of the farm in Großwelsbach, as the main agricultural enterprise, as well as the two malt factories located in the town, the VEB "Feuerteufel" (Firebug) and the only mill construction company remaining in the GDR, "ORANO", which also took over the production of millstones.

One of four Dingstühle of the Thuringian district court at Mittelhausen was located in Thamsbrück.

== Sights ==
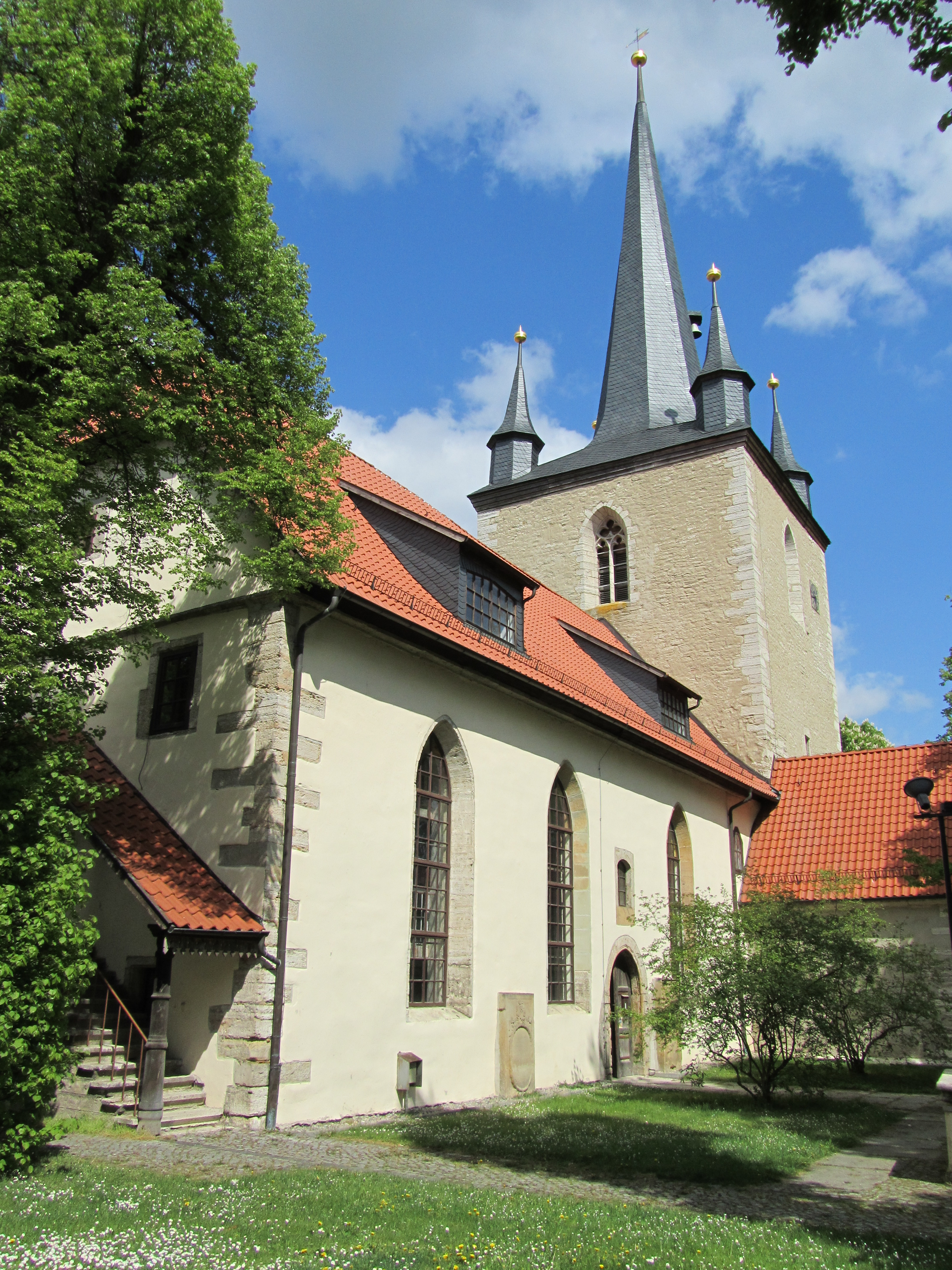
St George's Church

- St George's Church, Thamsbrück
- Town hall
- St Nicholas's Tower

== Notable people ==
- Ulrich Fleischhauer (1876–1960), anti-Semitic publicist and publisher
- Hermann Ludwig Blankenburg (1876–1956), composer, called "March King", honorary citizen of the town
