= C. L. Barnhouse Company =

American music-publishing firm

- Status: Active
- Founded: 1886; 139 years ago
- Founder: Charles Lloyd Barnhouse
- Country of origin: United States
- Headquarters location: Oskaloosa, Iowa
- Publication types: Sheet music
- Official website: barnhouse.com

The C. L. Barnhouse Company is an American music publishing firm. It was founded in 1886 by Charles Lloyd Barnhouse. It has been headquartered in Oskaloosa, Iowa since 1891.

Known today as a major publisher of educational instrumental (band) works, the C. L. Barnhouse catalog includes many historical publications of the classic concert band era by composers C. L. Barnhouse, Russell Alexander, Karl L. King, Fred Jewell, and J. J. Richards. There are some Jazz Ensemble composers, most notably Paul Clark, Lenny Stack, Larry Neeck, Howard Rowe, Rob Vuono Jr., and Larry Barton. Its popular current composers include James Swearingen, David Shaffer, Ed Huckeby, Rob Romeyn, Steven Reineke, and David Holsinger.

The company is managed by CEO Andy Clark and COO Andrew Glover.
