= Gian Battista Mantegazzi =

Swiss-Italian composer (1889–1958)

Gian Battista Mantegazzi (October 23, 1889 – February 5, 1958) was a Swiss-Italian composer best known for his marches. He led the Zurich City Band from 1928 until his death in 1958. Four volumes of the Heritage of the March record series featured his work.
