= Sesquicentennial March =

The Sesquicentennial March (Spanish: Marcha Sesquicentenario) is a well-known Peruvian march, composed by the Peruvian composer Jaime Díaz Orihuela (Arequipa, 1927-2020). The march, winner of a national contest for military music in celebration of the sesquicentennial of national independence in 1971, represents a grand combination of Andean sentiment and a pronounced martial theme. It is one of the more popular marches among those performed in parades and ceremonies in Peru.
