= VanderCook College of Music =

Private music school in Chicago, Illinois

Coordinates: 41°50′12.3″N 87°37′45.0″W

- Type: Private music school
- Established: 1909; 117 years ago
- Affiliations: Illinois Institute of Technology
- President: Kimberly A. Farris
- Undergraduates: 110
- Postgraduates: 200
- Location: Chicago, Illinois, United States
- Campus: 1 acre (0.40 ha)
- Colors: Blue and White
- Website: www.vandercook.edu

VanderCook College of Music is a private music school in Chicago, Illinois. It is the only college in the United States specializing solely in the training of music educators. Students may pursue bachelor's and master's degrees. The college is located in a Mies van der Rohe building on the campus of Illinois Institute of Technology (IIT). VanderCook is accredited by the Higher Learning Commission and the National Association of Schools of Music.

== History ==
VanderCook Cornet School (later VanderCook College of Music) was founded in 1909 by Hale Ascher VanderCook (1864–1949) to train professional musicians, directors and teachers.

The year 1909 is given as the founding date of VanderCook College because, in that year, Mr. VanderCook purchased the home, school and studios of his teacher, Alfred F. Weldon. The school was located at 1652 Warren Boulevard. Weldon (1862–1914) was one of the most famous brass instrument teachers in the Mid-West. The college's current philosophy of music education can trace its roots back to A.F. Weldon.

Hale A. VanderCook continued Weldon's teaching philosophy, with an expanded program of teaching. Mr. VanderCook was nationally known as a conductor, soloist, composer and teacher, and students came to him from all over the country for advanced training, coaching and preparations for professional careers.

Shortly after World War I, interest in school bands and orchestras and the need for trained teachers and directors for such organizations, created the demand for a special course of study to prepare for this work. For several years this work was given by individual lessons, but in 1926 classes in various subjects were organized.

By 1927, more space was needed and VanderCook purchased a large brownstone residence at 1655 Washington Blvd. (and Paulina), later adding adjacent buildings at 1653 and 1657 Washington Blvd. Students took required academic and education courses at nearby Lewis Institute. The root of the relationship between VanderCook College of Music and the Lewis Institute (later Illinois Institute of Technology) was the close friendship between Hale A. VanderCook and George L. Tenney, better known as "Doc" Tenney. "Doc" taught vocal music at the Lewis Institute and directed choirs in some of the largest churches in the Chicago area.

Then in 1928 the school was incorporated as a non-profit teacher training institution under the Illinois State Laws and its curriculum approved by the Board of Examiners of the Illinois State Department of Public Instruction. Graduates therefore obtained certificates to teach bands and orchestras in the public schools without examination. By now the school was known as VanderCook School of Music.

The first class to complete the approved four-year course of study for the degree Bachelor of Music Education was graduated at the summer session of 1931. Members of that class, all prominent teachers, were John H. Beckerman, Clarence F. Gates, Clifford P. Lillya, Hubert E. Nutt, William D. Revelli and Otto Uttke. These graduates were certified to teach bands and orchestras in the public schools.

After Lewis Institute merged with Armour Institute to form the Illinois Institute of Technology at 33rd and Federal Street, VanderCook School of Music was urged to move closer to the I.I.T. campus to continue the relationship it had fostered with the Lewis Institute. In 1953, a building site on Michigan Avenue, across the street from the I.I.T. dormitory area was purchased. In 1954, a large residence at 3219 S. Michigan Avenue was purchased and VanderCook moved to the new location. During this time the school changed its name to VanderCook College of Music.

In August, 1960, after several years of planning and fundraising, construction on a new building began. This building, located at 3209 S. Michigan Avenue, housed an auditorium, practice rooms, lounges, heating plant, storage, classrooms, offices and library. H.E. Nutt, co-founder of VanderCook College of Music, lived in the building until close to his death in 1981.

VanderCook College moved onto the campus of the Illinois Institute of Technology in 1996, into a building designed by Ludwig Mies van der Rohe. This move allowed VanderCook College to retain its autonomy while fostering a reciprocal arrangement with a larger university whose amenities include student housing and other student facilities, classroom and performing spaces in various campus buildings, and a large research library.

Notable alumni of the college include jazz bassist Richard Davis, music pedagogue Victor Zajek, composers Merle Isaac and William Owens, and renowned music educator Walter Dyett, who taught Gene Ammons, Nat King Cole, Bo Diddley, Dorothy Donegan, Von Freeman, Johnny Hartman, Dinah Washington, Redd Foxx, Red Holloway, and many more.

=== Midwest Clinic ===
Co-founders H.E. Nutt of VanderCook School of Music, Howard Lyons of Lyons Band Instrument Company and Neil A. Kjos of the Kjos Music Company formed the Mid-West International Band and Orchestra Clinic in 1946. The Midwest Clinic began as a local entity, quickly expanding to become one of the most recognized instrumental music education clinics in the world. The VanderCook Symphonic Band has been involved with the clinic since the beginning, with faculty and undergraduate students participating in clinic work, concert performances, reading sessions, and other operating activities for the clinic to run successfully.

=== Presidents ===
- John H. Beckerman, 1950–1966
- Hubert E. Nutt, 1966–1974
- Richard Brittain, 1975–1980
- James Gilworth, 1981–1989
- Roseanne K. Rosenthal, 1989–2004
- Charles T. Menghini, 2004–2017
- Roseanne K. Rosenthal, 2017–2024
- Kimberly A. Farris, 2024-

== Campus ==
VanderCook College of Music currently resides at 3140 and 3125 S. Federal Street on the campus of the Illinois Institute of Technology. Plans on the building began in 1948 and it was built in 1950 by architect Ludwig Mies van der Rohe. The buildings, known as the AAR Technical Center, was two of three buildings that formed the Association of American Railroads (AAR) Complex. The location of the Association of American Railroads on the campus of the Illinois Institute of Technology was symbolic of the close relationship between the railroads and technological educational institutions in matters of research. These buildings are based on the model of a steel system with glass and brick curtain walls. The corner detail of the VanderCook College building (3140) is notable for brick that rises higher at the base of the wall before the steel begins above. VanderCook College of Music moved into the building in early 1996.

=== Chronology of VanderCook College's locations ===
- 1652 Warren Boulevard (1909–1927)
- 1655 W. Washington Blvd. (1927–1954)
- 3219 S. Michigan Ave. (1954–1969)
- 3209 S. Michigan Ave. (1960–1996)
- 3140 S. Federal Street (1996-)
