= Harold J. Crosby =

American composer and music arranger (1886-1920)

Harold Josiah Crosby (February 11, 1886 – January 18, 1920) was a composer and arranger of band and orchestra music best known for his marches. Crosby was born in Dexter, Maine and studied at Colby College, the University of Maine, and the New England Conservatory of Music. He played trombone, euphonium (baritone), piano, and organ for several orchestras and theater ensembles. Crosby's marches rose to prominence in the early 20th century, with several pieces becoming staples of military bands during World War I. He died in New York City on January 18, 1920. Three volumes of the Heritage of the March record series were dedicated to his work.
