= Roman de San Jose =

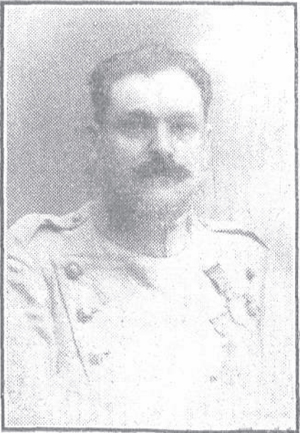
Roman de San Jose, Military musician author of several marches still in force

Roman de San Jose was born in Plasencia (Cáceres) in 1877. He entered the Army in 1894, the band of drums Castilla Regiment No. 16. In 1900, he amounts to the position of bandmaster. Between 1909 and 1913 he participated in the war in Africa which receives several awards. In 1914 he directed the band from Asturias Infantry Regiment and in 1915 the Quartermaster Academy where he remained until 1928. In 1937, retires by age.

He is the author, among other works, popular military march "El Turuta" and march "Everything Are Clouds".
