= Gerardo Iasilli =

American composer

- Born: November 10, 1880; Muro Lucano, Basilicata, Italy
- Died: May 10, 1969 (aged 88); New York City, New York, United States
- Occupation: Composer

Gerardo Iasilli (November 10, 1880 – May 10, 1969) was an Italian-American saxophonist, conductor, and composer.

He was born in Muro Lucano, Italy, and immigrated to the United States in 1904. He first joined the Silvio Mancini Band, where he eventually became assistant conductor and arranger. He later joined the Giuseppe Creatore Orchestra. He then formed and led his own band Orchestrina Italiana Gerardo Iasilli.

He composed and arranged mostly brass and band music. He composed a number of marches, including the "American Army", "America", and "Blue Eagle" marches. He entered a composition into the 1932 Summer Olympics mixed music art competition.

He wrote many books of etudes and exercises for saxophone, and published many arrangements for band and for saxophone.

== Compositions ==
- American Army March
- America March
- Andrea Doria
- Blue Eagle March
- Generale Umberto Nobile
- Do re mi
- Amor perduto valzer (Lost Love Waltz)
- Passione
- La Bella Mazurka
- Dolce Ricordo
- The New Italy March
- Nicoletta
- Triplin Sax
- Marcia Zingaresca
- Marcia Palermitana
- Creatore's Band March
- Piccoli Bersaglieri (Little Italian Riflemen)
- Furore d'Una Banda (Furor of the Band)
- Liberta dei prigionieri Italiani

Many of these compositions were recorded on early Victor and Columbia phonographs, where he is credited variously as Iasilli, Issilli, and Jasilli.
