= Turkish March =

A Turkish march—in Italian, marcia alla turca—is a march written by a classical composer in the Turkish style that includes particular rhythmic patterns and often features piccolos, cymbals, bass drums and triangles.

Turkish March may refer to the following specific pieces of classical music:

- Turkish Rondo, or Rondo alla turca, the third movement from Wolfgang Amadeus Mozart's Piano Sonata No. 11, K. 331 (1783)
- Turkish March (Beethoven), from Ludwig van Beethoven's Six Variations, Op. 76 (1809), which he re-used as the fourth movement in the 1811 incidental music The Ruins of Athens, Op. 113. The march from The Ruins of Athens was arranged for piano by Anton Rubinstein.
- A section in the style of a Turkish march from the last movement of Beethoven's Symphony No. 9, Op. 125 (1824)

Other Turkish marches include:

- Michael Haydn: Marcia tuchesca in C major (1795)
- Giacomo Meyerbeer: Wirt und Gast, oder Aus Scherz Ernst, Act II: Türkischer Marsch
- Mikhail Ippolitov-Ivanov: Turkish March
