= Monroe Althouse =

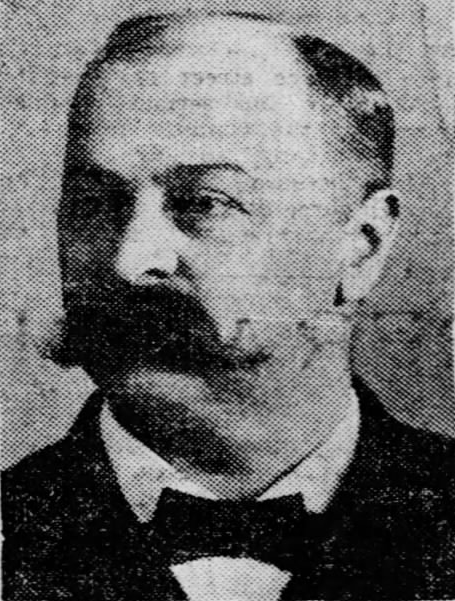
- Born: May 26, 1853; Centre Township, Berks County, Pennsylvania
- Died: October 12, 1924 (aged 71); Reading, Pennsylvania
- Occupations: Composer, bandmaster

Monroe A. Althouse (May 26, 1853 – October 12, 1924) was a composer and bandmaster best known for his parade marches. He was born in Centre Township, Berks County, Pennsylvania and spent his youth working on the family farm. He learned to play the violin, trombone, and baritone as he toured with Buffalo Bill's Wild West Show during his teens. After performing with several local bands, orchestras, and theater ensembles near Reading, Pennsylvania, he organized the pit orchestra for the Rajah Theater and was selected to lead the Ringgold Band. He became friends with John Philip Sousa and the two composers stayed in contact as each toured the country. Althouse co-founded the James S. Althouse & Co. music publisher. He retired from conducting in 1922 due to poor health. After three years of illness, he died in Reading on October 12, 1924. Five volumes of the Heritage of the March series were dedicated to his compositions.
