= Viktor Widqvist =

Swedish military musician and composer (1881 - 1952)

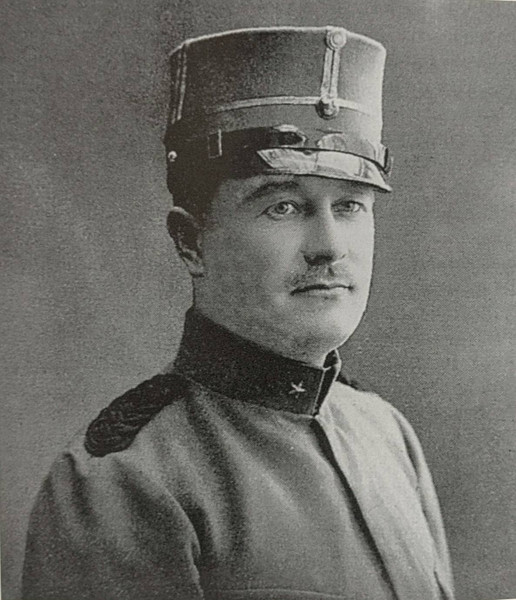
Viktor Widqvist

Viktor Widkvist (1881–1952) was a Swedish military musician and composer.

== Career ==
He was born Viktor Magnus Widkvist in Stockholm in the Jakob och Johannes parish on 27 December 1881. Viktor was the son of Johan Viktor Widkvist, a piano maker and tuner for Bergquist & Nilssons Pianofabrik and mother Albertina Dalqvist. As a child he learned to play the violin and the tuba.

In 1898 at the age of seventeen Viktor began his military career by enlisting in the Svea Engineer Battalion (Ing 1) band in Stockholm performing on the tuba and flute under music director Adolf Johnsson. He began his study at the Stockholms Musikkonservatorium in 1901 graduating in 1908. His professors included Magnus Ahlbergm (violin) and Ernst Henrik Ellberg (counterpoint). He also studied violin with Sven Kjellström after the violinist’s return to Sweden from Paris in 1909. He was promoted to music sergeant in 1903.

Between 1910-1918 while serving in military bands he was also concertmaster in several Stockholm orchestras. He served as bandmaster of the Boden Engineer Regiment (Ing 3) (Third Engineer Regiment) band in Boden from 1918 and the Göta Engineer Regiment (Ing 2) (Second Engineer Regiment) in Karlsborg from 1922 to 1925. He received his lieutenant's commission on 5 December 1919. Another famous Swedish march composer and bandmaster Sam Rydberg also served in the engineer regiment bands and the two formed a friendship and competed as march composers. Rydberg’s “På vakt” became the official march of the Svea Engineer Corps (Ing 1) and Widkvist’s “Bodens ingenjörregementes marsch” was adopted in 1922 as the official march of the Boden Engineer Regiment (Ing 3).

In 1925 Viktor retired from military service at the age of 44 following the government’s reduction in the number of military bands from 60 to 34. Widkvist, an excellent violinist, appeared as a violinist in orchestras and tubist in civilian bands (sometimes performing with his friend Rydberg). He also taught elementary school music at the Ängby school. He was awarded knight of the Order of Vasa. Widkvist died after a short illness on 22 December 1952.

== Compositions (all marches unless otherwise noted) ==
Widqvist's compositions include numerous marches, a concert overture, folk song arrangements, and dances. His most famous composition, the virtuosic march "Under blågul fana" [Beneath the Blue and Yellow Banner] was likely composed in or just before 1916 (the earliest score in the archives of the Flottans musikkår i Stockholm [Navy Band] is dated 1916). It became a national march in 1969 when official visits involved the Swedish armed forces. It became the honnörsmarsch (honor march) of the Swedish Army in 1976 and the official march of all the armed forces in 1999.

- Alltid redo [Always Ready]
- Bodens ingenjörskårs marsch (Ing 4/Ing 3) (dated 4 June 1922, Widkvist’s composition became the official march for the regiment)
- Chefsmarsch [The Chief's March (for the colonel of the regiment)]
- Dans på logen (barn dance)
- Festmarsch
- Fladdrande fanor [Fluttering Banners] - Ubåtsvapnets marsch; march of the 1st Submarine Flotilla
- Flaggan i topp! [Fly the Flag] (likely 1935)
- Friska vindar [Refreshing Winds, or; Making Waves]
- Från broslaget
- Militärfest (1943)
- Mälardrottningen [The Queen of Lake Mälaren] (although published in 1950 it was likely composed in the 1910s)
- Norrlandsfärger [Colors of Norrland] Norra militärområdets marsch Northern military region march (originally titled Standard Marsch; likely composed between 1916 and 1920)
- På högvakt [On Guard]
- Stadionmarsch
- Svensk jubileumsmarsch (1939)
- Svenska klanger [Swedish Sounds]
- Sverige på vakt [Sweden on Guard] (likely composed in 1914)
- Sångarmarsch
- Triumfmarsch [Triumph Marsch]
- Under blågul fana [Beneath the Blue and Yellow Banner] (1916?) Arméns honnörsmarsch och Försvarsmaktens marsch aka The blue and Yellow Banner / Beneath the Blue and Yellow Colours
- Vid mälarstrand [At mälarstrand]
- Överstelöjtnant Norinder [Colonel Norinder] Dedicated to Colonel of Engineer Regiment 4 Axel Norinder

== Discography ==
- "The Music of Barnhouse and Widkvist" Heritage of the March Volume 6. Includes seven Widqvist marches recorded around 1973. United States Navy Band conducted by Donald W. Stauffer. LP: Hoe Records; 71482. Also available digitized on the web.
- "Mälardrottningen" Marscher af Viktor Widkvist" Kungliga Bohusläns regementes musikkår conducted by Enar Mårtensson (1977) is the only full program of Widkvist to date, including eleven marches listed here in track order: Mälardrottningen, Stadionmarsch, Fladdrande fanor, Chefsmarsch (Sydkustens örlogsbas marsch), Kungl. Bodens ingenjörregementes marsch, Sverige på vakt, Under blågul fana (Arméns honnörsmarsch), Norrlandsfärger, Militärfest, Sångarmarsch, Alltid redo, Från broslaget, Festmarsch. Stockholm: Mercury, LP C78-0147.
