= Los peruanos pasan =

Peruvian military march

Los peruanos pasan (English: Peruvians pass) is a Peruvian military march composed by Peruvian musician Carlos Valderrama Herrera. It is one of the most popular marches in the Peruvian army and is performed at official Peruvian parades, such as national holidays, and in civilian and military ceremonies.

== History ==
The march was composed by Valderrama in 1934 as a musical tribute to the Virgin of Mercy, the patron saint of the armed forces in Peru. It was played for the first time in the Sacramentos de Santa Ana barracks.

== Characteristics ==
The march is in 2/4 rhythm and is reminiscent of Roman trumpets and drums, as well as incorporating sounds linked to the Spanish paso doble and influences of the pentatonic scale associated with the Andes.
