= The Washington Post (march) =

Composition by John Philip Sousa

- March by John Philip Sousa
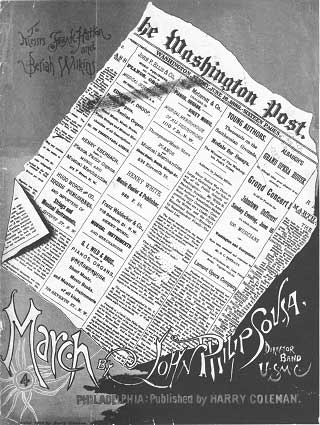
- Cover of the 1889 sheet music for "The Washington Post"
- Composed: 1889

Audio sample
- The United States Marine Band performs "The Washington Post": file; help

"The Washington Post" (often called "The Washington Post March") is a march composed by John Philip Sousa in 1889. Since then, it has remained as one of his most popular marches throughout the United States and many other countries.

== History ==
In 1888, the recent purchasers of The Washington Post newspaper—Frank Hatton, a former Postmaster General, and Beriah Wilkins, a former Democratic congressman from Ohio—requested that Sousa, the leader of the United States Marine Band, compose a march for the newspaper's essay contest awards ceremony, in conjunction with a campaign to promote the newspaper under new ownership. Sousa obliged; "The Washington Post" was introduced at a ceremony on June 15, 1889, "with President Benjamin Harrison in attendance" before "a huge crowd on the grounds of the Smithsonian Museum". It quickly became quite popular in both the United States and Europe as the standard musical accompaniment to the two-step, a late 19th-century dance craze. This led to a British journalist dubbing Sousa "The March King". Sousa is honored in The Washington Post building for his contribution to the newspaper and his country.

The composition is in the public domain in the US, as its copyright has expired, due to Sousa's death more than 70 years ago and its publication before the early 1920s.

During the award ceremony the young essay-contest winners were presented with gold medals that were hand-crafted by local jewelers Galt & Bro., with each having unique designs and custom engravings.

== Composition ==
Opening (post-introduction) melodic line of The Washington Post March as written nominally in G major for a B-flat transposing instrument (key in concert pitch: F major)

=== Music ===
This recognizable march is written in standard form: IAABBCCDCDC. Written in compound duple meter, it is suited as an accompaniment to the two-step, a new dance introduced at that time.

The opening strain of the march is famous and familiar to many. Typically, the march is played at a tempo of 110 to 120 beats per minute, rarely any faster.

March enthusiasts have argued that the trio sections' mellow and moving phrases are among Sousa's most musical. Six sudden eighth notes move the melody along. Its unusually calm break strain is a simple adaptation of the trio melody. It then moves on to the first trio repeat, where the low brass begins an even more mellow countermelody.

=== Scoring ===
- Woodwinds: 2 flutes, piccolo, 2 oboes, 2 clarinets, 2 bassoons
- Brass: 4 horns, 2 trumpets, 3 trombones, tuba
- Percussion: timpani, cymbals, bass drum, snare drum, triangle
- Strings: violins I and II, violas, cellos, double basses

== Dance ==
The "two-step" became so strongly identified with Sousa's march that the dance was often called "The Washington Post". In addition, many performance arts groups around the world dance to the famous song.

== Recordings ==
Although many recordings of this march have been made over the years, the original recording of the march played by the United States Marine Band, conducted by Sousa's concertmaster, was made on Graphophone cylinder for the fledgling Columbia Records company in Washington, D.C., in 1890, catalogue Columbia Cylinder Military #8. It has been reissued in the compact disc era in 1999 by Legacy International as March King: John Philip Sousa Conducts His Own Marches, and as the earliest track of its 26-disc compendium of the history of the Columbia label, Sony Music 100 Years: Soundtrack For A Century. In 1893, this march was recorded on North American Phonograph Company cylinder #613 by Foh's 23rd Regiment Band of New York. This acoustical recording, unlike many others, has audible, clear, well-recorded drums.

== In popular culture ==
This march is briefly featured during a vice presidential rally in Miloš Forman's 1981 film Ragtime.

Stephen Sondheim's musical Assassins mixes the tune from this march and also the one from Sousa's operetta El Capitan during the song "How I Saved Roosevelt."

== See also ==
- List of marches by John Philip Sousa
- Chicago Tribune March
