= Ed Huckeby =

American musician

Dr. Ed Huckeby, (b. 1948) is an American composer, musician, conductor, and educator.

== Biography ==
Huckeby's career in music began in 1968, which marked the start of his eight years teaching music to students in public schools throughout Oklahoma. In 1976, Huckeby was appointed a professor at Northwestern Oklahoma State University, where he would later become music department chair, director of educational outreach, and, in 1990, dean of the graduate school. In 1998–99, Huckeby served as the executive director of Tulsa Ballet (Tulsa, Oklahoma) prior to becoming the associate vice president for academic affairs at Northeastern State University (Broken Arrow, Oklahoma) on July 1, 1999. In January 2010, he became the president of Southwestern Christian University, located in Bethany, Oklahoma.

Huckeby's skills as a musician include the mastery of many instruments, including the horn, the trumpet, the bass guitar, the organ, the piano and vocals. He has served in a symphony orchestra, a jazz band, and a Christian quintet.

== Compositions ==
Concert Band

- Academic Processional & Recessional
- Acclamations
- Accolada
- American Folk Fantasia
- And We Proceeded On
- Annandale Chronicles
- Antecedium
- El Arco De Los Cabos
- Ascentium
- Bridgeview Overture
- By the Rivers of Babylon
- Canticle of the Saints
- Celebrations
- Concertante for Winds
- Declaration, Ballade & Finale
- Explorations
- Eye of the Falcon
- Fanfare and Toccata
- Fanfare, Hymn and Dedication
- Fiera Winds
- For thy Courts Above
- From Whom All Blessings Flow
- Glorioso
- God Rest You Merry, Gentleman
- The Golden Circle
- Good Tidings To All
- Heroic Sketches
- In a Japanese Garden
- Innova
- Intrada and Festival
- Intrada, Recitative and Rondo
- Jubiloso
- Legend of the Ida Glenn
- Let There Be Peace On Earth
- Lexicon
- The Magic of Mozart
- March of the Roughnecks
- Mind Sets
- Of A Distant Star
- On Angel Wings
- On Wings of Eagles
- Ouverture Internationale
- Overtura
- Overture to a New Millennium
- Pastorale
- Pine River Trilogy
- Prelude and Primal Danse
- Prelude, Opus 28, No.4
- Prima Rock
- Proclamation & Symphonic Decree
- Prologue and Festiva
- Ring the Bells on Christmas Day
- The Road To Damascus
- Septagon
- Silent Noon
- Still, Still, Still
- The Spirit of Christmas
- Spirit of the Heartland
- Spirit of Unity
- Symphonium
- Three Southern Vignettes
- Vignettes De La Vie
- West Salem Winds
- What Child is This?
- When The Tears Fell

Young Band

- Abington Ridge
- Addison Way
- American Folk Dance
- American Patrol
- American Volunteers
- Ancient Echoes
- Angel Flight
- Angela's Song
- Animoso
- Antigua Bay
- Ashland Park
- Away In A Manger
- Beyond the Stars
- Blue Lake Reflections
- Bolero Africana
- Brandon Bay
- Cambrian Overture
- Celebrata
- Chant and Celebration
- Christmas Cheer
- Concentra
- Contempra
- Covenant
- Crystal Medallion Overture
- Danza Espanol
- Deck the Halls With Chips and Salsa
- Dreamscape
- Drummin' Surf-ari
- Equinox
- Erika's Dream
- Evening Portrait
- Exclamations
- Faces of the World
- Falcon Ridge
- Fernando's Fandango
- The First Breath Of Spring
- Follow the Star
- Foxfire
- Heartland Legacy
- Horn-A-Plenty
- Introduction and Rondo
- Journey to Centaurus
- Joyant Winds
- Joyful and Triumphant
- Kidz' Klassix
- The King's Court
- King's Mountain Adventure
- Kitty Hawk
- Knights of the Round Table
- Knock Before You Rock
- Leader of the Class
- Let Freedom Ring!
- Lost Creek Adventure
- Loonie Cartoonie
- March Britannia
- March of the Kangaroos
- Marching Down Main Street
- Matrix March
- Modal Episode
- My Favorite Time of the Year
- Mystic Visions
- Themes From the Nutcracker
- Northwest Territory
- Of Courage And Valor
- One Christmas Night
- One O'Clock Rock
- Oxford Pointe
- The Phantom Train
- Rising Star
- Royal Empire
- Sagebrush Saga
- Santa Loves To Cha-Cha
- Santa's Sleigh Ride
- Saxsational!
- The Secrets of McDougal's Cave
- Shades of Gold
- Shawnee Creek Legend
- Slide Show
- Slippery Slide Rag
- Smokey Mountain Rhapsody
- Spirit of the Sphinx
- Starwatcher
- Stone Creek Episode
- Stone Mountain Fantasy
- Super Mom Symphony
- Taco Time
- Tool Time Tango
- Uncle Buck's Truck
- Woodland Hills*

Jazz Ensemble

- Struttin'

Marching Band

- Bravio!
- Charges, Cheers! And Other Fun Stuff
- Energize!
- Fight Song
- Gettin' Busy
- Have You Got That Spirit?
- Hot Shot!
- Impact Zone!
- Journey of the Cosmic Centurions
- Kick Start
- Let Freedom Ring!
- Power Station
- Ragtime Rockin' Roll
- Rock It!
- Rollin' In My Sweet Baby's Arms
- 7th Street Swing
- Struttin'
- Talkin' Back
- Trailblazer
- Turbo Rock
- Whiz Kids

== See also ==
- James Swearingen
- Robert W. Smith
