= George Rosenkrans =

- Born: January 17, 1881; Penfield, Pennsylvania
- Died: August 18, 1955 (aged 74)
- Occupation: Composer

George Rosenkrans (January 17, 1881 – August 18, 1955) was an American composer of concert band music born in Penfield, Pennsylvania on January 17, 1881.

Rosenkrans' father served as a schoolteacher and later as choir director for the local Methodist church, where George sang and learned to play the organ. He attended Penfield High School and in 1898, became the first of his family to graduate.

At age 17, he was paid $50 to professionally arrange his first march, "American Soldier March." From then on, he began arranging his own work. His composition of "Triumphant Battalions," published in 1903, was later played by the lead American band entering Paris following its liberation in World War II. In 1904, he published "My Lady Lindy."

By his early twenties, he composed six to eight fully orchestrated band numbers and patriotic marches annually. His dirge, "Immortal Heros," was performed at a number of funerals including Franklin D. Roosevelt and Winston Churchill. In later life, he composed many works, including the "Grampian March", for the Grampian Band in nearby Grampian, Pennsylvania.

George Rosenkrans died on August 18, 1955.
