= Charles Lloyd Barnhouse =

American music publisher

Charles Lloyd Barnhouse (March 20, 1865 – November 18, 1929) was a 19th-century American music publisher. Barnhouse started a music publishing firm in 1886 that exists today as the C. L. Barnhouse Company, selling band music around the world.

Barnhouse was born and raised in Grafton, West Virginia where he became an expert cornet player and went upon the road with a theatrical company, later taking charge of a band at Mount Pleasant, Iowa, for three years and at Burlington, Iowa, for one year. In 1891 he moved to Oskaloosa, Iowa and took charge of the Iowa Brigade Band, of which he was leader for fifteen years.

In 1888, he had begun publishing music for bands, orchestras and miscellaneous musical organizations. He entered upon this work at Mount Pleasant and continued in the business in Burlington and Oskaloosa. He had a well-equipped printing plant and conducted a successful business. He also sold his own compositions and arrangements of music for bands and orchestras.

In 1886, he was married to Miss Josephine B. Scott, who was born in Pennsylvania in 1868 and was a daughter of J. H. and Mary E. (Hare) Scott. They had four children: Jamie M., Lloyd, Dorothy, and Irene.

== List of Works ==
- Red, White and "Blues" (1916)
- Favors for All (1927)
- Tripoli Temple March (1928)
- Our Flag Unfurled (1929)
- The Regulars (1929)
