= Russell Alexander =

American entertainer and composer

"Belford's Carnival"
"Belford's Carnival", published in 1897 and played here by the U.S. Navy Band in 2006.

"The Storming of El Caney" played by the Bensenville Municipal Band conducted by Fred Lewis. Recorded in concert May 17, 1986.

Russell Alexander (February 26, 1877 – October 1, 1915) was an entertainer and composer, active primarily with vaudeville shows and musical comedy organizations.

Alexander was born in Nevada, Missouri, and became a euphonium virtuoso who joined the circus band of Belford's Carnival at the age of 18. At 20, he became arranger and euphonium soloist with the Barnum & Bailey Circus Band and toured Europe from 1897 to 1902. Following his tour with Barnum & Bailey, Alexander worked in a novelty musical vaudeville act with his brothers. Although his compositional output was relatively small, he is considered a great composer of marches. He wrote 33 marches, 6 galops, and several overtures, novelties, and other works. For part of his career he worked in acts with his brothers, Newton and Woodruff.

On July 20, 2015, a memorial plaque honoring Alexander was unveiled on the Main Street Stage in Liberty, New York, just a short distance from the Old Town Cemetery in which Alexander is buried. The ceremony included a performance of seven Alexander works.

== Works ==
Unless noted, his works were published by C. L. Barnhouse Co., to whom Alexander's widow sold the rights to his music shortly after his death.

- Across the Atlantic March (1899)
- Americans Before Havana Overture (unpublished)
- Baltimore's Boast March (1899)
- Bastinado Galop (1908)
- Belford's Carnival (1897)
- Burr's Triumphal (1897)
- The Butterfly Dance (unpublished)
- The Cantonians March (1908)
- Charioteers of Semiramis Galop (unpublished)
- Colossus of Columbia (1901)
- The Comedy Club March (1907) White Publishing
- Congressional Limited Galop (unpublished)
- The Conquest March (1913) Fillmore Bros. Music House
- Conway's Cantata March (unpublished)
- The Crimson Flush March (1897)
- The Darlington March (1896)
- Decatur at Tripoli Overture (unpublished)
- Embossing the Emblem March (1902)
- The Exposition Four March (1903)
- The Four Gladiators (1899) (unpublished)
- From Tropic To Tropic March (1898)
- Hampton Roads March (1919) Fillmore Bros. Music House
- International Vaudeville (1897)
- Memphis the Majestic (1900)
- Olympia Hippodrome March (1898)
- Pall Mall Famous March (1909) Star Music Co
- Paramour of Panama March (1904) McMillin
- Patriots of the Potomac March (1903)
- La Reine March (1907)
- Rival Rovers March (1899)
- Round Up The (1916)
- Salute to Seattle March (1905)
- Shoot the Chutes Galop (1901)
- Song of the South (1905) [Solo with Band Acc.]
- The Southerner March (1908)
- The Southerners Galop (unpublished)
- Steeplechase Galop (1900)
- The Storming of El Caney (1903)
- Storming El Caney March (unpublished)
- Vicksburg the Valiant March (unpublished)
- Vienna to Vicksburg (unpublished)
- Yankees in Vienna March (unpublished)
