= 7th New York Militia Regiment =

7th New York Militia Regiment 7th Regiment, New York National Guard
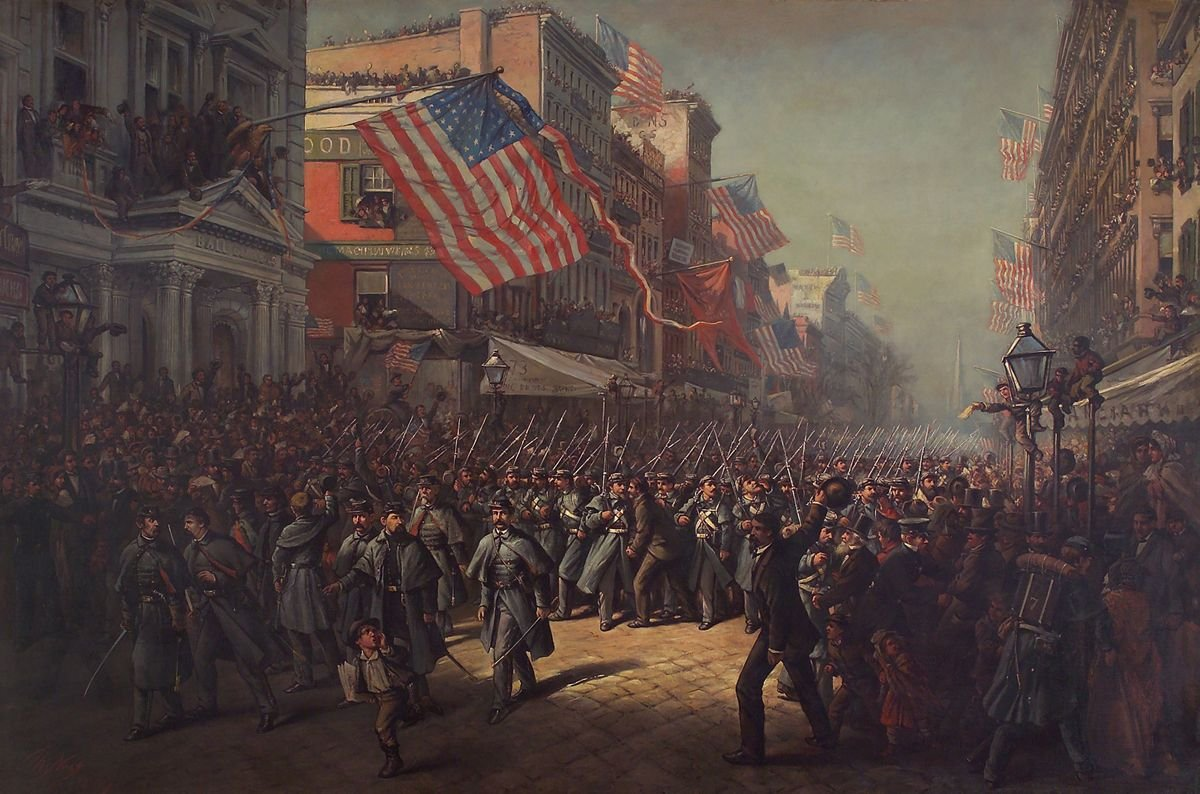
- The artist depicted a patriotic, flag–festooned scene as the regiment passed in review on Broadway before Major Robert Anderson.
- Active: 1806–1922, 1940–1943
- Country: United States
- Allegiance: State of New York
- Branch: New York State Militia
- Type: Infantry (Militia)
- Size: Battalion
- Headquarters: Seventh Regiment Armory, Manhattan, New York City
- Nicknames: "Silk Stocking" "Blue-Bloods"
- Colors: Grey
- Successor: 107th Support Group
- Engagements: Militia duties; Great New York City Fire of 1845; Astor Place Riot; New York City Police riot; Dead Rabbits riot; New York City draft riots; Orange Riots; Great Railroad Strike of 1877; War Service; American Civil War; First World War

Commanders
- Notable members: Augustus Belknap; Frank Buckles; Sanford Robinson Gifford; Rufus King Jr.; Robert Gould Shaw

The 7th Regiment of the New York Militia, aka the "Silk Stocking" regiment, was an infantry regiment in the Union Army during the American Civil War. Also known as the "Blue-Bloods" due to the disproportionate number of its members who were part of New York City's social elite, the 7th Militia was a pre-war New York Militia unit that was mustered into federal service for the Civil War.

== Creation ==
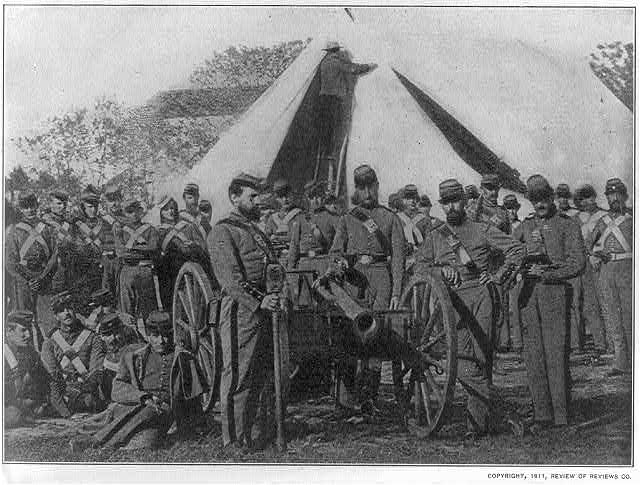
The New York Seventh in Washington, D.C., 1861.

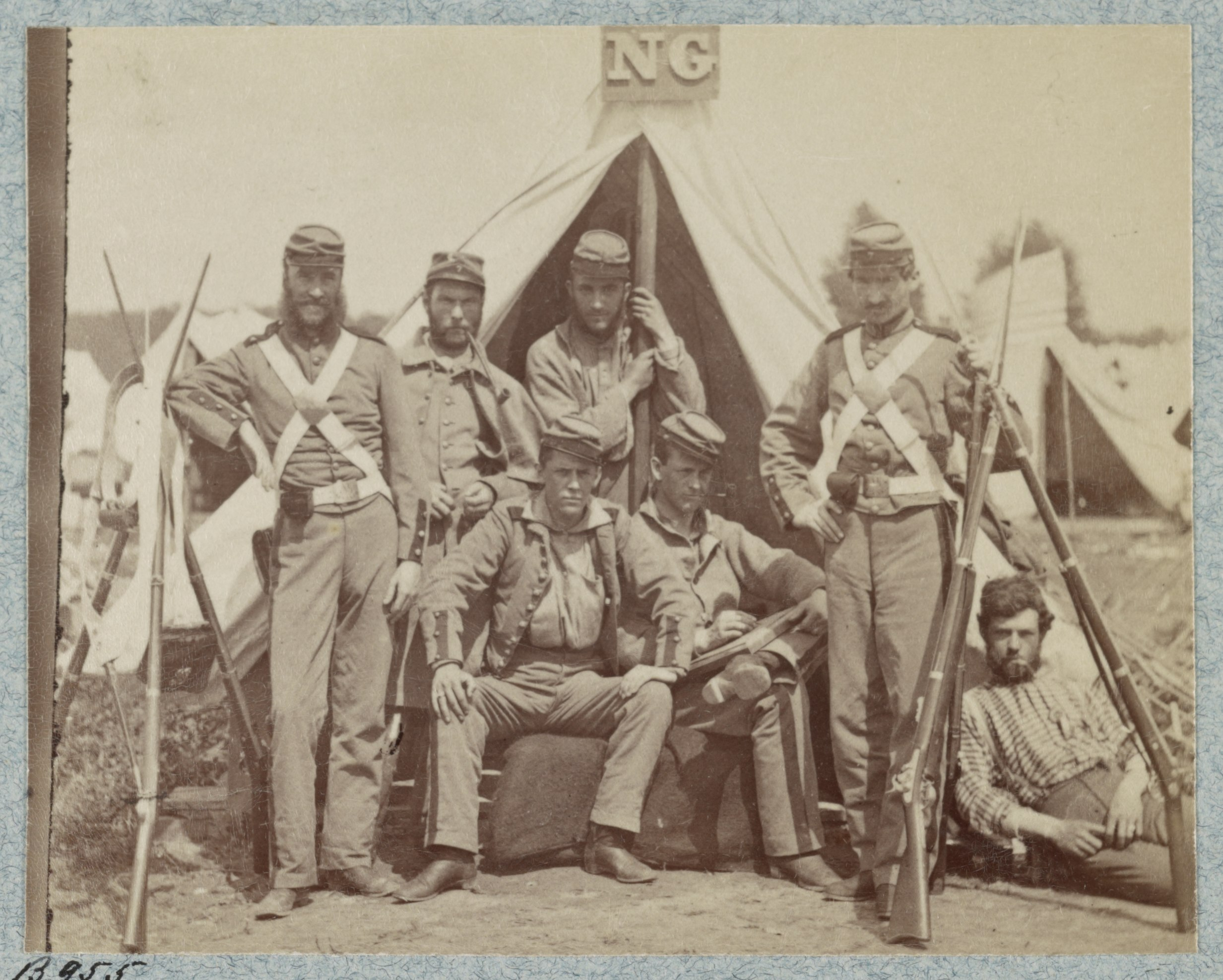
New York 7th Regiment soldiers about 1861

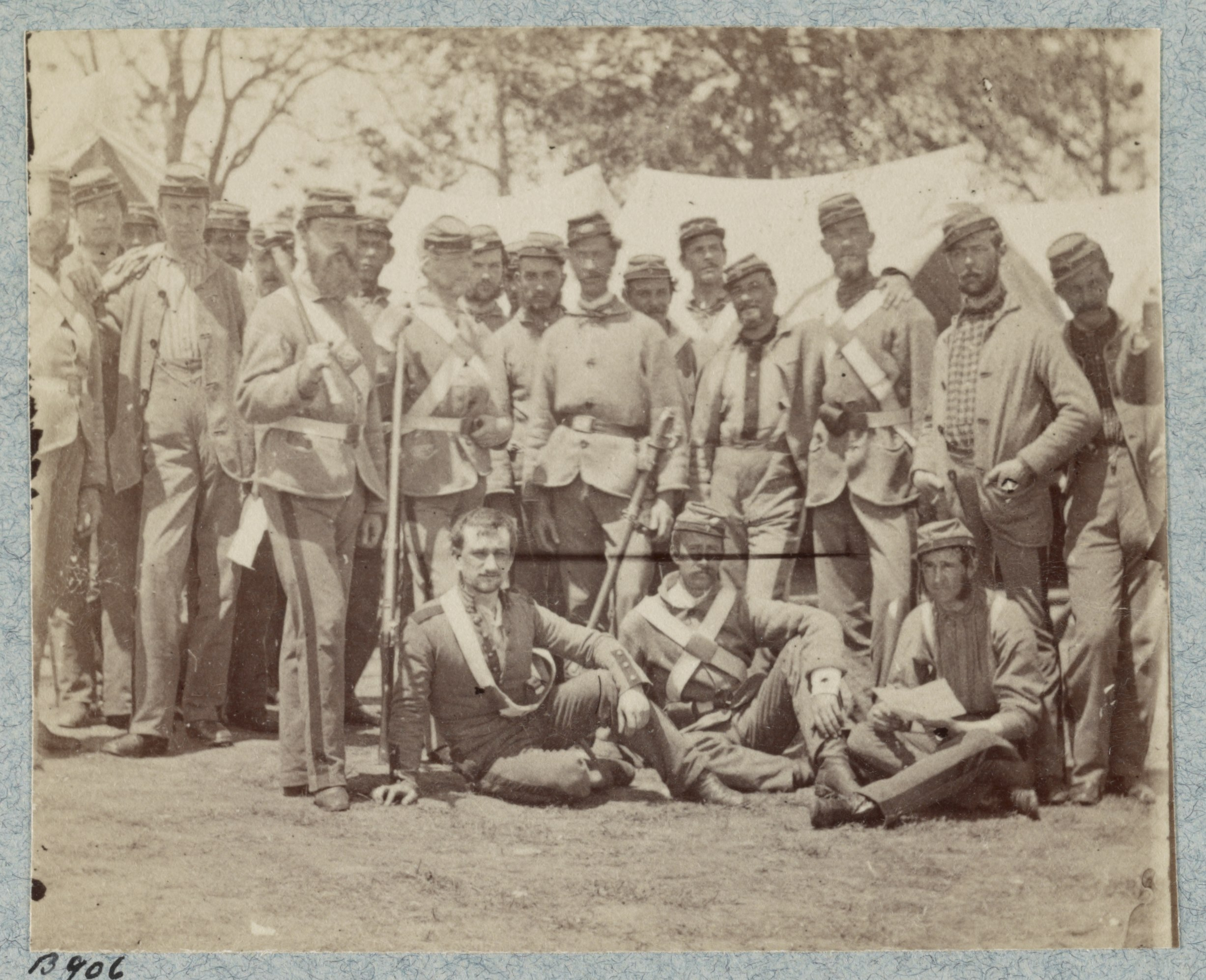
New York 7th Regiment soldiers about 1861

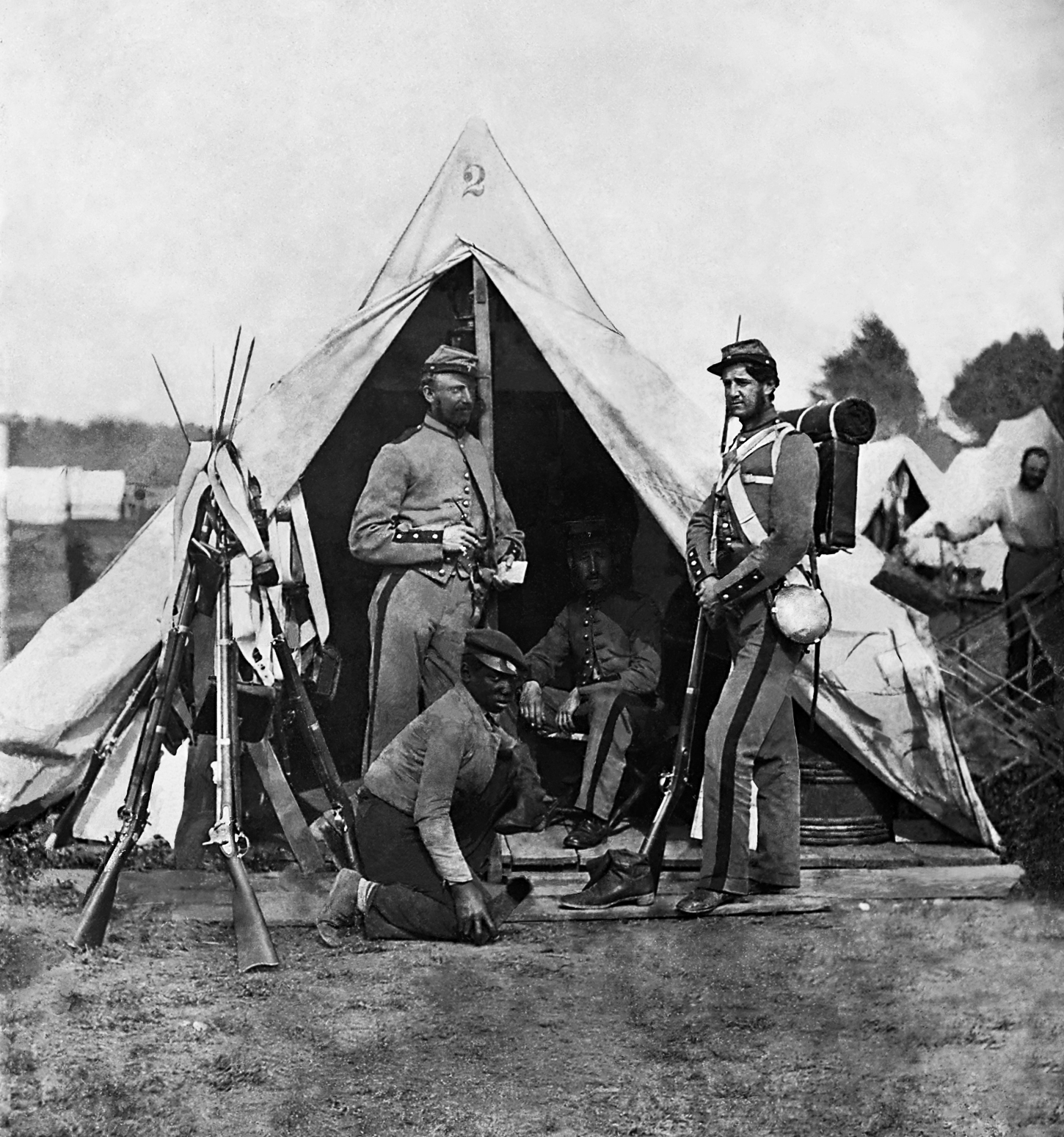
The 7th Infantry in New York during the Civil War (photography by Mathew Brady).

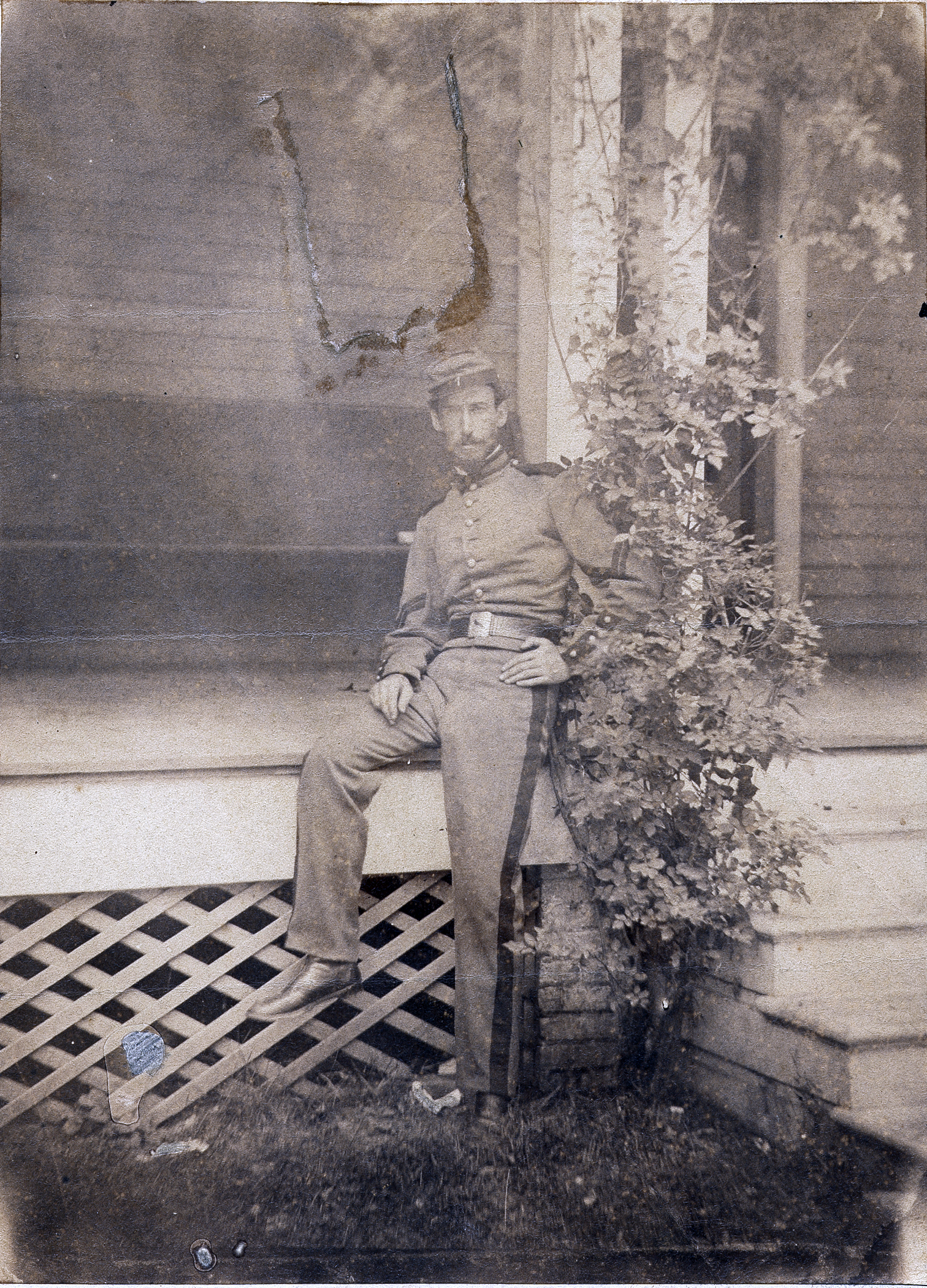
Corporal Sanford Robinson Gifford.

The regiment, located in New York City (companies A, B, C, and D), was organized during the furor created by the firing of British at American vessels off Sandy Hook in April 1806, as the 1st, 2nd, 3rd and 4th companies. On 25 June 1806, they were officially reorganized by the state as part of the uniformed militia of the state, and attached to the First Brigade of the Battalion of Artillery commanded by Maj. Andrew Sitcher.

On 5 April 1807, the battalion became the 2nd Battalion, 3rd Regiment of Artillery, New York State Militia. As tensions with the United Kingdom increased in 1807, these four companies, with other volunteers, were temporarily organized as a regiment, commanded by Col. Peter Curtenius, and remained thus detached until 20 April 1809.

In 1812 the battalion became the 2nd Battalion, 11th Regiment of Artillery, New York State Militia. In 1812-14 the regiment was deployed in the harbor forts of New York.

On 25 August 1824, the battalion was named Battalion of National Guards (its distinctive name until, in 1862, the legislature appropriated it for the uniformed militia) in tribute to the Marquis de Lafayette. Gray uniforms were adopted and the intention to become a regiment was declared. In December 1824, the fifth company was organized, and Captain Stevens' company, of the 11th New York Artillery, transferred to it as the sixth company.

In January 1825, the battalion was transferred to the 2nd New York Artillery.

On 1 October 1825, the battalion was detached and organized as a separate and independent battalion, and during the month the seventh company was organized.

On 4 May 1826, the organization of the eighth company was completed, and 7 May, the battalion was organized into a regiment, the 27th Artillery.

17 April 1838, a troop of cavalry was admitted to the regiment, which, in 1861, became the ninth company.

In 1843, the state furnished the regiment with arms, it having heretofore provided them itself.

On 27 July, the designation of the regiment was changed to 7th Regiment.

In 1847 the regiment was redesignated the 7th Regiment of Infantry (National Guard), New York State Militia (7th New York Militia).

In April 1849, an engineer corps was organized, which was revived and reorganized 1 March 1855.

A tenth company, Company K, was organized 29 March 1860.

== 19th century active service ==
The regiment was frequently ordered to hold itself ready for service, and did active service for the United States, the state and New York City, as follows:

- United States service from 15 September to 15 December 1812
- from 2 September to 2 December 1814
- in support of state or municipal authority: execution of James Reynolds, 19 November 1825
- at the Election Riots, 10 April 1834
- Abolition Riot, 11 to 12 July 1834
- Great Fire of New York, 17 December 1835
- Stevedore Riot, 24 February 1836
- Flour Riots, 6 February and 6 March 1837
- Anti-rent War, 9 to 10 December 1839
- Croton Water Riot, 22 to 23 April 1840;
- Great New York City Fire of 1845, 19 to 21 July 1845
- Astor Place Riot 10, 12 and 14 May 1849
- Police Riot 16 June 1857
- Dead Rabbits Riot 5 July 1857
- Staten Island Quarantine War, 3 September 1858
- preserving order at camp of Spinola Brigade 12 to 19 September 1862
- Draft Riots, July 1863
- Orange Riots, July 1871
- Labor Riots, July 1877
- Motormen's Strike, Brooklyn, January 1895,
- strike at Croton Dam, April 1900
- service in the War of the Rebellion.

== Civil War ==
After organizing and brief training, the regiment, commanded by Colonel Marshall Lefferts, left New York City for Washington, D.C., on special call of President Abraham Lincoln on April 19, 1861, arriving in Annapolis Junction, Maryland, and opening communications with Washington April 24–25. There it was mustered in the service of the United States for thirty days, 26 April 1861; it served at Washington and was mustered out at New York city, 3 June 1861. Among the organization's notable members during the war was Henry W. Hubbell, who enlisted as a private and retired as a brigadier general in 1905.

25 May 1862, the regiment, still commanded by Col. Lefferts, again left the state, and was mustered in the United States service at Camp Hamilton, Va., 29 May 1862, for three months, from 26 May 1862. It served most of this time at Baltimore, Md., and was mustered out of the United States service, 5 September 1862, at New York City.

16 June 1863, it again re-entered the United States service, and was mustered in at New York City, for thirty days. It left the state on the 17th, under the command of Colonel Lefferts, served at Baltimore, and Frederick, Md., in the 2d Separate Brigade, Middle Department, 8th Corps, and was mustered out of the United States service, 20 July 1863, at New York City.

In its service, in 1861, it lost one enlisted man, accidentally killed, and it took part in the advance into Virginia on 24 May 1861.

The regiment was housed in the Capitol Buildings at Washington from April 25–May 2, and was mustered into Federal service on April 26, serving duty at Camp Cameron, Meridian Hill, Georgetown Heights, from May 2–23. After occupation of Arlington Heights, Virginia, May 24–26, it assisted in building Fort Runyon and was mustered out at New York City on June 3, 1861.

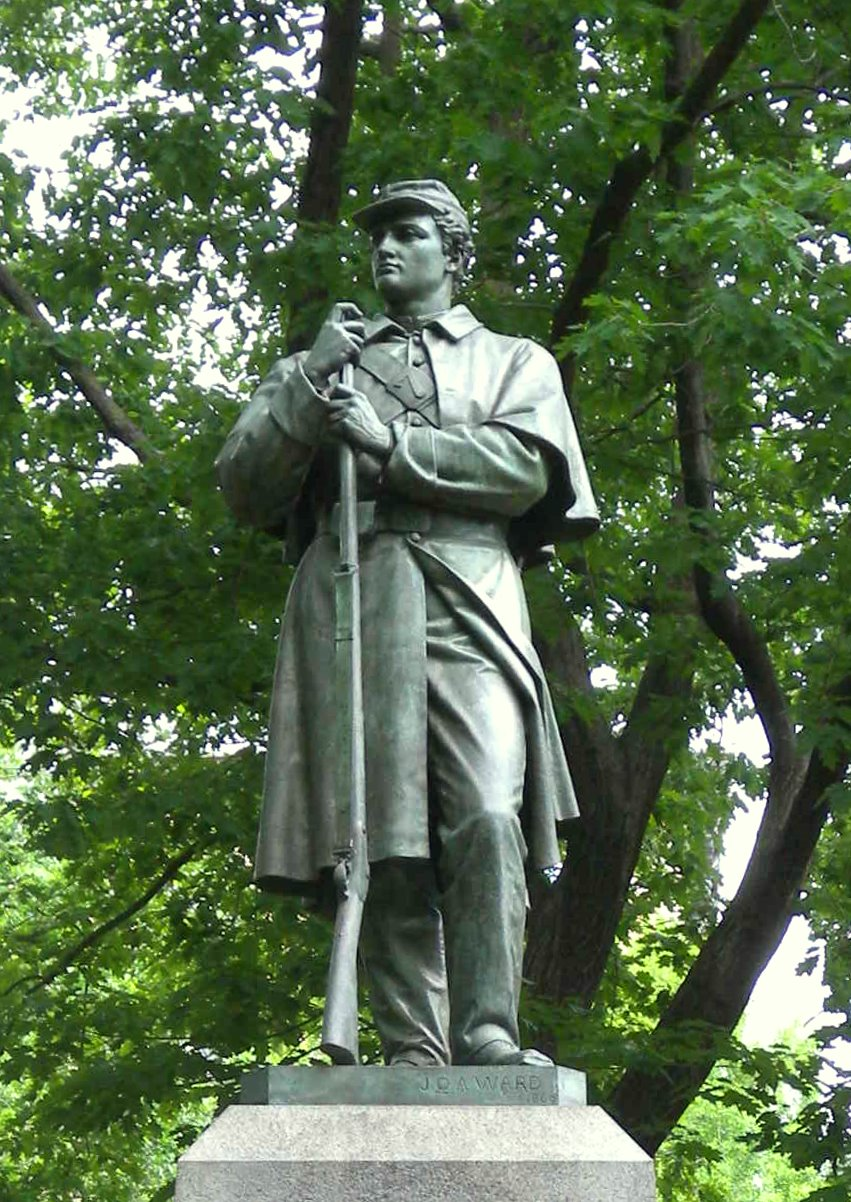
7th Regiment Memorial, Central Park

The regiment was again mustered in for three months' service on May 25, 1862. It left New York City for Baltimore, Maryland, on May 26, and then was attached to Dix's Command, Middle Department, to July 1862. Then, it was assigned to the VIII Corps, Middle Department, to September 1862. It was in camp at Stewart's Hill, Baltimore, from May 28 to June 5, and duty at Fort Federal Hill from June 6 to August 28. The regiment mustered out in New York City on September 5, 1862.

Once again, the regiment was mustered in, this time for thirty days' service starting June 16, 1863, and departed for Baltimore on June 17. It was attached to Morris' Brigade, 8th Army Corps, Middle Department, to July 7, and then to the 3rd Division, III Corps, Army of the Potomac, to July 15. It was on duty at Fort Federal Hill and provost duty in Baltimore from June 18 to July 5 before being ordered to Frederick, Maryland, on July 5, and picket and outpost duty there until July 14. It reached New York City on July 16. The 7th was on duty during the New York Draft Riots from July 16–21.

The regiment mustered out for good on July 21, 1863.

The Headquarters of the 7th during the Civil War was at the Tompkins Market on Third Avenue. In 1879, it was moved uptown to the newly built Seventh Regiment Armory on Park Avenue.

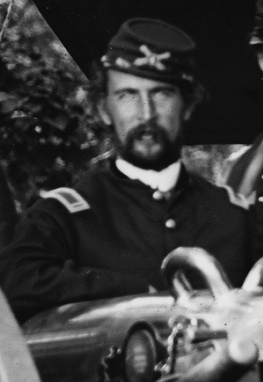
Then First Lieutenant Rufus King, Jr. during the American Civil War

One noteworthy member of the regiment, who left a body of paintings of the regiment's service, was Sanford Robinson Gifford; another was Rufus King, Jr. who was awarded the Medal of Honor. Also a member as a private during the spring 1861 deployment to Washington was Robert Gould Shaw, later commander of the 54th Regiment Massachusetts Volunteer Infantry.

== Seventh Regiment Band ==
In 1852, the 7th Regiment Band was organized. A German musical society of the mid-19th century formed the Seventh Regiment Band consisting of forty-two professional German musicians. It was the only exclusively regimental band of the Civil War–era and one of the most popular brass bands of the time; its first bandmaster Joseph Noll - then a prominent violinist in New York musical life, being a member (as well as soloist and occasional concertmaster) of the New York Philharmonic Orchestra and later a conductor of the Brooklyn Philharmonic - used brass and reed instruments in equal proportion.

In 1860, Claudio S. Grafulla became the band-leader and reorganized the band. He added more woodwinds to the band and continued to serve as its director until his death in 1880. The band gained a high reputation under his leadership. He composed and is best remembered for his march, Washington Greys. Grafulla was succeeded as bandmaster by his principal trombonist Carlo Alberto Cappa (1834–1893), and famed cornetist Walter B. Rogers then conducted the band from 1893 to 1898. Rogers was succeeded by George Humphrey from 1898 to at least 1908.

The band was honored in 1922 by John Philip Sousa's The Gallant Seventh march, written while Lieutenant Francis Sutherland was bandmaster. On 18 April 1923, Sousa conducted the band in playing The Star-Spangled Banner at the opening of Yankee Stadium.

== Later service ==
After the Civil War, the 7th Regiment continued as a unit of the New York State National Guard. In 1858 it briefly occupied Staten Island in response to the destruction of the country's largest quarantine facility, an episode known as "The Quarantine War." It was noted for its military efficiency as well as the social status of its members.

Pre-World War I members included August Thayer Iaccaci and his brother Paul Iaccaci

In 1917 the regiment was called into federal service and redesignated the 107th Infantry Regiment. q.v. The 107th Infantry served in combat in France as part of the 27th Division during World War I.

On 6 March 1919, the regiment arrived back in New York City on board the USS Leviathan and demobilized on 2 April 1919 at Camp Upton. On 30 December 1920 the regiment was assigned to the 27th Division and allotted to the state of New York. It was partially reorganized on 1 June 1921 by consolidation with the remaining 7th Infantry Regiment, New York National Guard and became the 107th Infantry Regiment.

Frank Buckles, the last surviving American World War I veteran, may have served with the regiment from 1922 to 1923.

== See also ==
- 7th Regiment Records 1767-1983 New-York Historical Society
- List of New York Civil War regiments
- 7th New York Volunteer Infantry Regiment
