= Joyce's 71st New York Regiment March =

American military march from 1881

Joyce's 71st New York Regiment March
Mayhew Lake's arrangement as performed by the United States Army Band.

Joyce's 71st New York Regiment March
Boyer's original arrangement performed by the United States Marine Band on October 5, 1922.

Joyce's 71st N.Y. Regiment March is an American march composed by band director, arranger, and composer Thornton Barnes Boyer (1856–1936) in 1881. Boyer's "most famous" composition, it is a classic of the American parade and concert band march repertoire, and is regularly performed by U.S. military bands today in tours and concerts.

== History ==
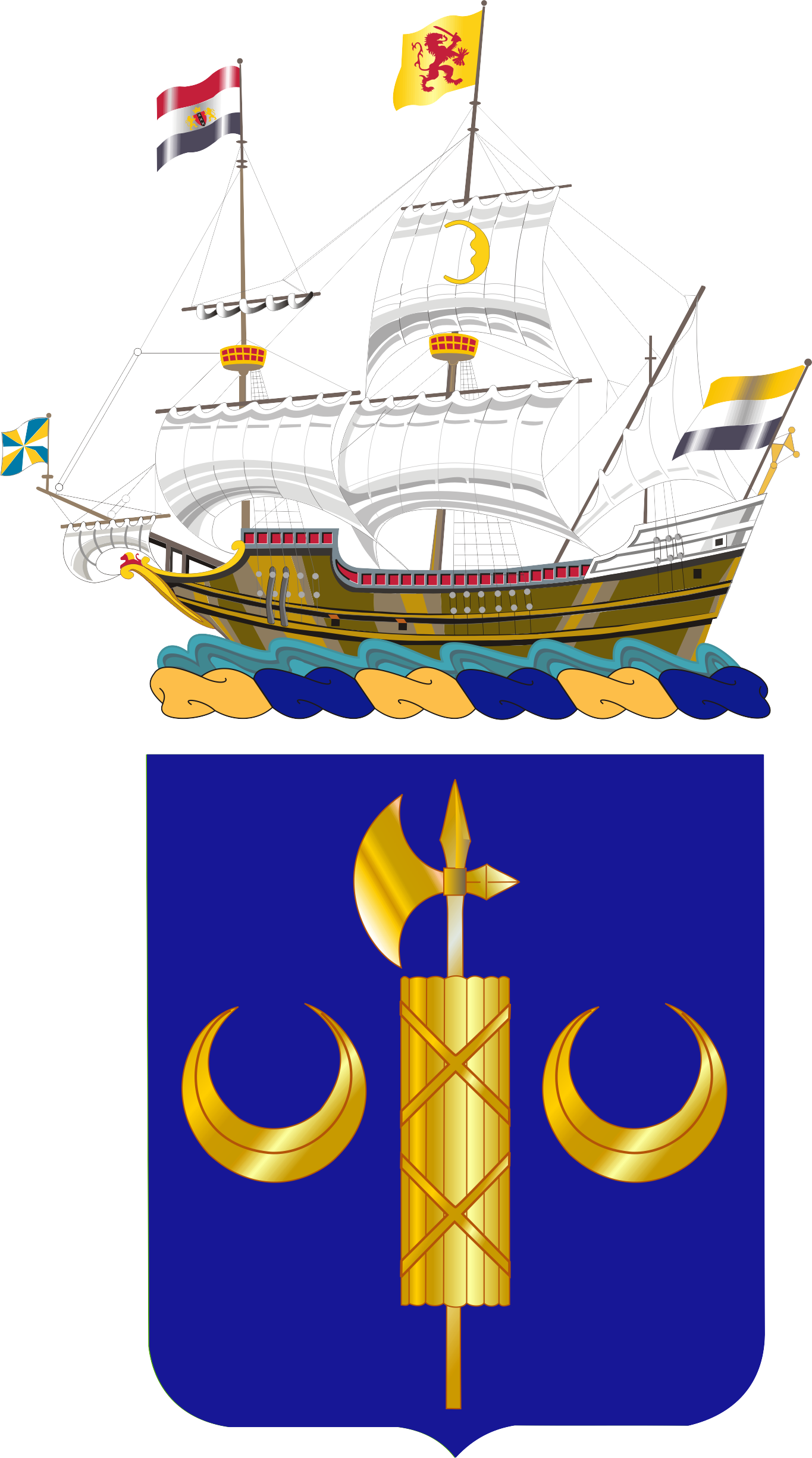
The coat of arms of the 71st N.Y. Infantry

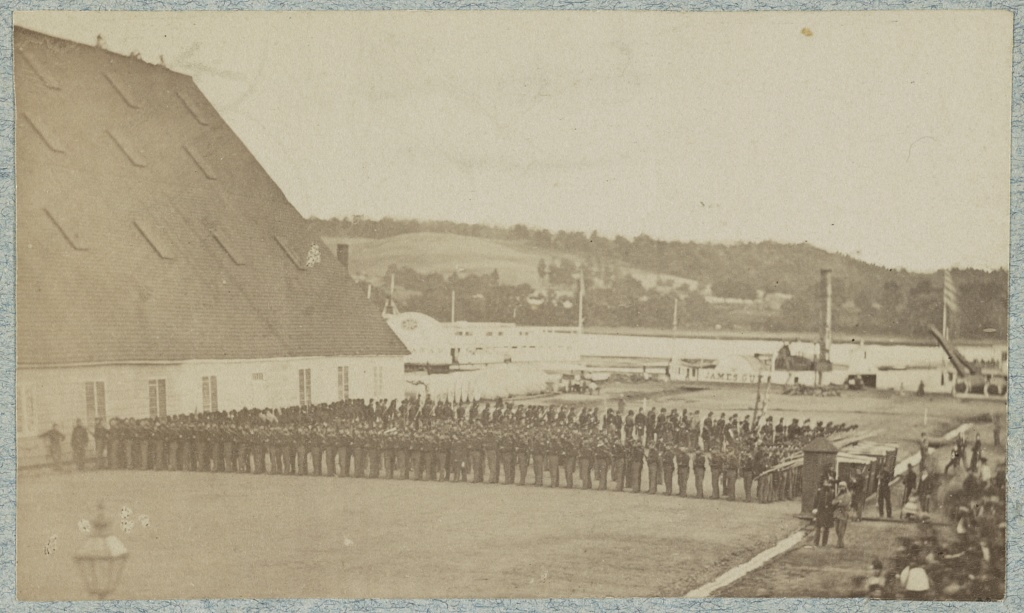
The 71st in Washington during the Civil War

Dedicated to the regimental band of the 71st New York Infantry Regiment, "one of the most well-known military bands of the 19th century," Boyer composed the march while living in Philadelphia, Pennsylvania, and employed by the J. W. Pepper Music Company, which "quickly published" the march after receiving it. The "Joyce" referenced in the march's title is Thomas Joyce, who founded the 71st Regiment's wind band after the unit became part of the New York National Guard in the aftermath of the Civil War. Known as "The American Guard" beginning in 1853, when their Ogden long rifles were replaced with bayonet-carrying muskets, the 71st New York Regiment was founded on October 23, 1850, and took part in the First Battle of Bull Run, the Battle of Chancellorsville, the occupation of Alexandria, Virginia, and the Battle of Gettysburg.

Boyer had a long experience with military music throughout his life, and "after having written music for the 225th anniversary of Philadelphia in 1907, [he]...was music director for the 6th Illinois Regiment band, and then [moved] to Keokuk, IA, where he occupied a similar position with the 50th Iowa Volunteer regiment band."

== Arrangements ==
In 1937, Mayhew Lake created a well-known arrangement of the march, adding "a euphonium countermelody and some of the rhythmic patterns." Lake's arrangement also "altered the repeats, added many fills, and changed the trio key from G-flat major (relative to E-flat minor) to the parallel E-flat major."

== See also ==
- Washington Greys (song)
- The Stars and Stripes Forever
- American march music
- U.S. Military bands
- 71st New York Infantry Regiment
