= Scream Machine =

Scream Machine is a jazz band piece written by Mark Taylor for the Army Blues Jazz Ensemble in 1985. It is also known as "Brass Machine", a simpler arrangement in a lower key for younger bands by the same composer.

== History ==
Mark Taylor was an arranger for the United States Army Band from 1977 until his retirement in 2001. In 1985, he wrote Scream Machine as a trumpet feature. The work was part of the jazz fusion movement, fusing together elements of jazz and rock. It was released as the title track on an album by the US Army Blues in 1985. On the original recording, the trumpet soloists were Steve Jones and Dave Detwiler.

It was recorded by the Dave Stahl Band in 1987, on their album Anaconda.

The easier arrangement "Brass Machine" has become popular in school jazz bands.
