= Tompkinsville, Staten Island =

Neighborhood in New York City

Coordinates: 40°38′02″N 74°05′09″W

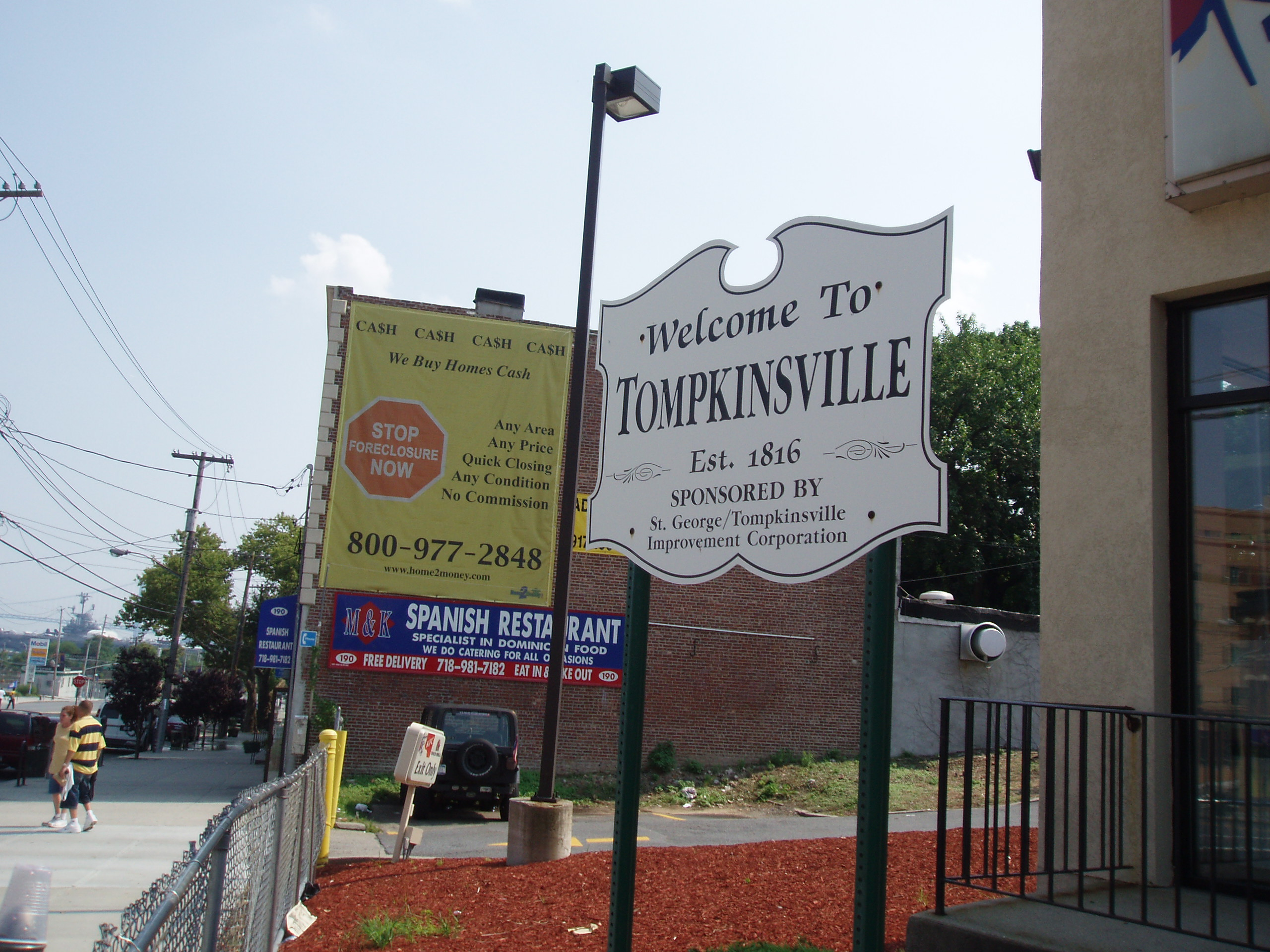
Tompkinsville Welcome Sign

Tompkinsville is a neighborhood in northeastern Staten Island in New York City. Named for Daniel D. Tompkins, sixth Vice President of the United States (1817–1825), the neighborhood sits on the island's eastern shore, along the waterfront facing Upper New York Bay, between St. George on the north and Stapleton on the south; however, it is considered part of the North Shore by the island's residents.

== History ==
=== Early history ===
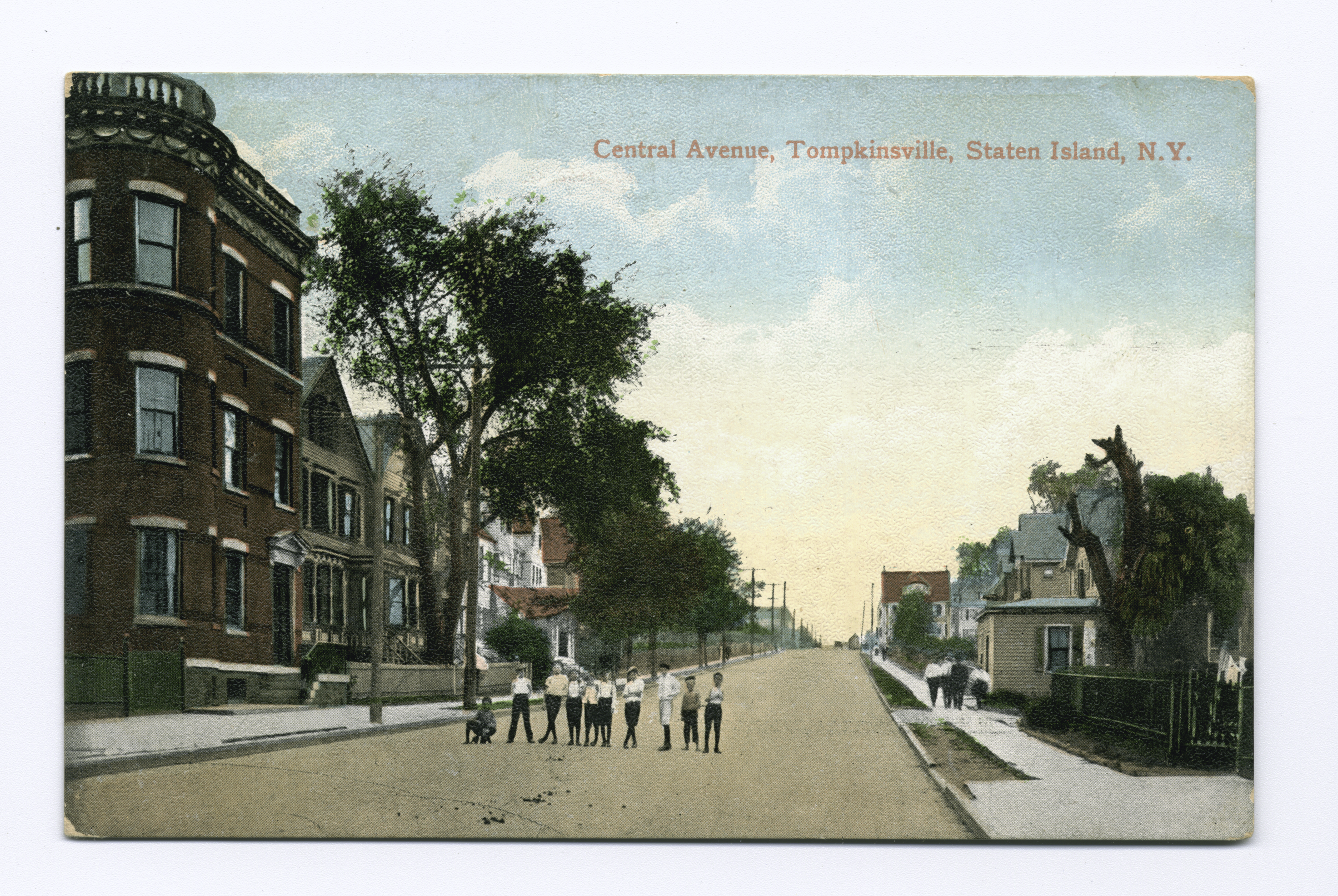
Central Avenue, early 20th century

Tompkinsville, located in the Town of Castleton, was the site where early European explorers replenished their fresh water supplies and was known in colonial times as the "Watering Place". It was opposite the Watering Place that the then largest British expeditionary force, with 450 ships and 32,000 soldiers, arrived in Upper New York Bay and landed in advance of the American Revolutionary War. In 1799, the New York state government took 30 acres (12 ha) along the waterfront, upon which it established the New York Marine Hospital (also "The Quarantine"), a contagious disease hospital and quarantine station.

In 1815, a settlement was established by New York state governor, Daniel D. Tompkins, in the neighborhood next to the hospital. He was elected Vice President the following year. In 1817 Tompkins built a dock at the foot of present-day Victory Boulevard and began offering steam ferry service to Manhattan. Angry residents burned down the Quarantine in 1858 in a series of attacks known as the Staten Island Quarantine War. Although there were no deaths as a result of the attack, the arsonists completely destroyed the hospital compound.

=== 20th century ===
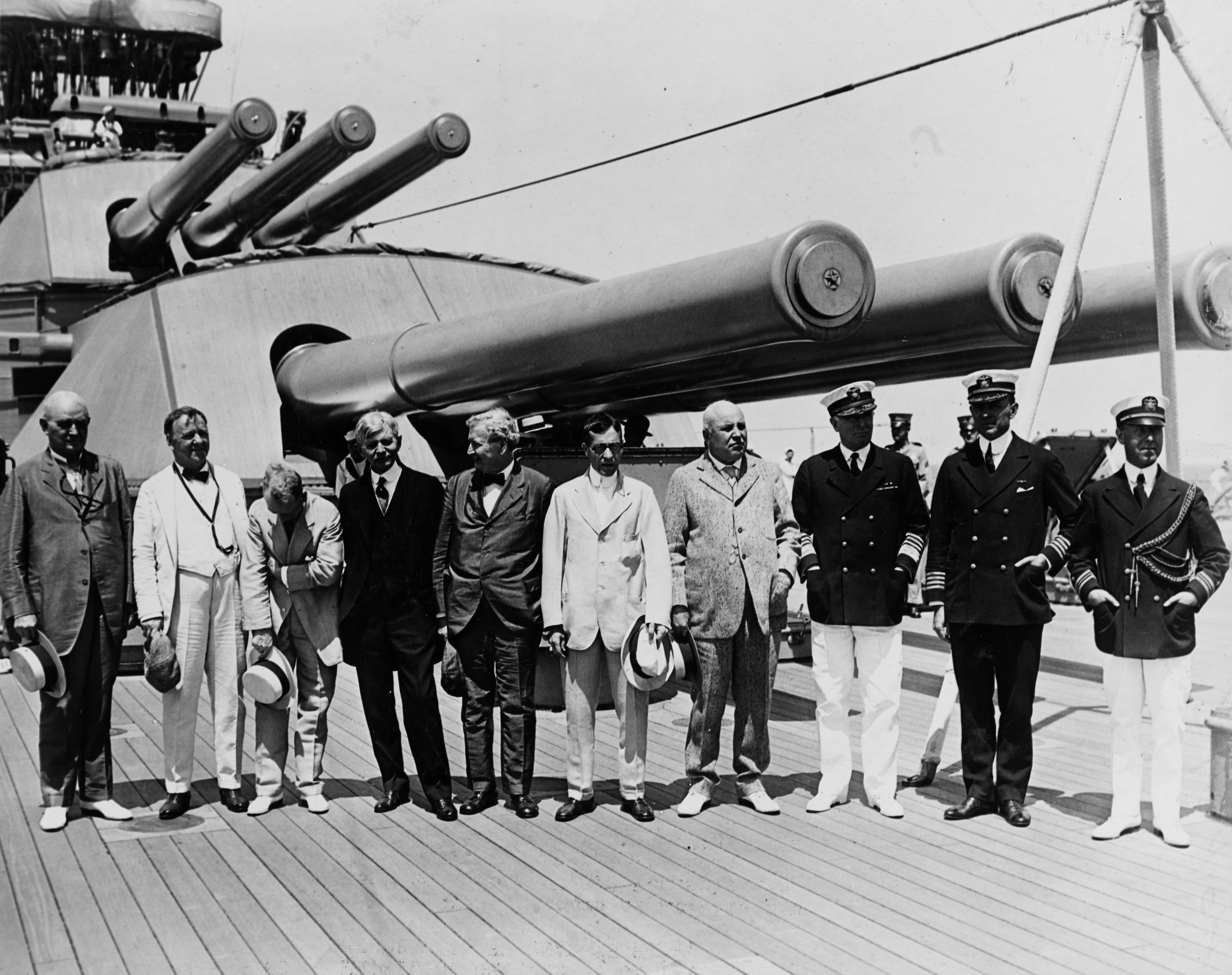
Members of President Wilson's cabinet who went out on the USS Pennsylvania to welcome him home from the Versailles Peace Conference

In the early 1900s, the telephone exchange that served Staten Island's eastern North Shore was named after the neighborhood; the name of this exchange was changed to "Saint George" in the mid-1920s, and to "Saint George 7" when New York Telephone upgraded telephone service throughout New York City in December 1930. Converted for All-Number Calling, "727" still exists on the island today. It is the sole surviving number of the designations of the 1920s.

Tompkinsville was the site of a US Navy Naval Frontier Base for many years. The base was particularly active during the US engagement with World War I. On July 8, 1919, a delegation consisting of President Woodrow Wilson, Vice President Thomas R. Marshall; Secretary of the Navy Josephus Daniels; Secretary of the Treasury Carter Glass; Secretary of Labor William B. Wilson; Secretary of War Newton D. Baker; Secretary of the Interior Franklin K. Lane; and Senator Champ Clark went aboard USS Pennsylvania for a cruise back to Manhattan.

The Lyons Pool Recreation Center, one of several public swimming pools built as part of a Works Progress Administration project, opened in Tompkinsville in 1936. During World War II, it was designated Tompkinsville, SI, New York.

=== 21st century ===
In the 21st century, Tompkinsville became a racially mixed area, and a little Sri Lanka had developed. There is also a large population of Italian-Americans, African Americans and Mexicans. In 2014, black Staten Island resident Eric Garner was killed by police in Tompkinsville, in an incident that received widespread media coverage.

In 2019, the section of Bay Street in Tompkinsville was rezoned to allow for a higher concentration of residential, commercial, and office space along the street. The plan was controversial, as the vast majority of Staten Island Community Board 1 members had rejected the plan, as did many residents of Tompkinsville, and the commissioners of the New York City Planning Commission had mixed opinions. The city government announced the North Shore Action Plan in 2023, which included various improvements in St. George, Tompkinsville, and Stapleton. In Tompkinsville, these would include a promenade, the reconstruction of Pier 1, the completion of Lighthouse Point and the Mary Cali Dalton Recreation Center, and new or repurposed housing developments, scheduled to open in Spring 2026. Lighthouse Point was completed in 2025.

== Culture ==
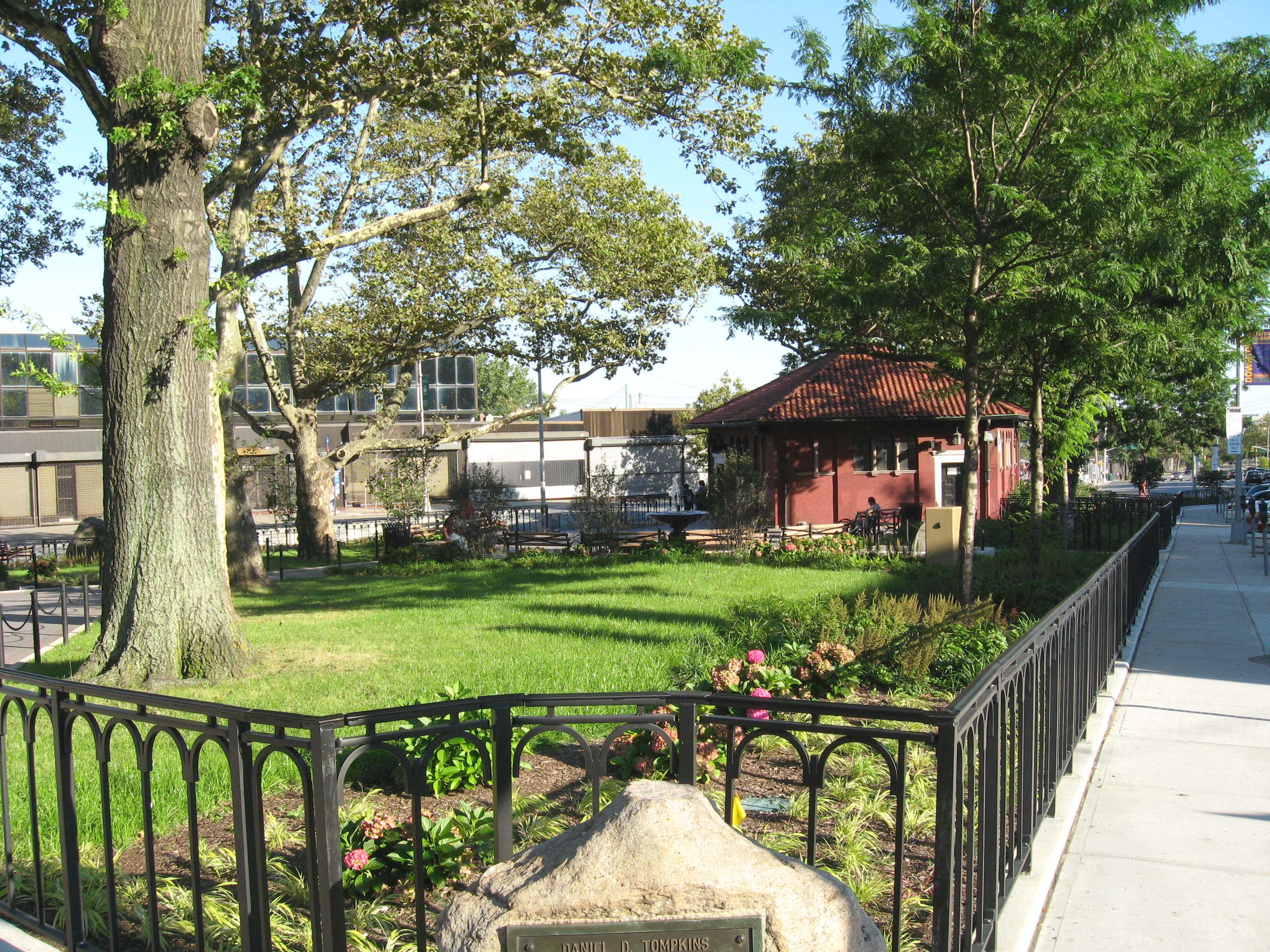
Tompkinsville Park

Tompkinsville contains an enclave of Sri Lankans. The neighborhood also hosts a number of live music and art venues, including Everything Goes Book Café, Deep Tanks Studio, Coyle Cavern, Ink Chyx Tattoo & Art Gallery, and the Staten Island LGBT Community Center, all of which take part in the north shore's monthly Second Saturday art walk. As with much of the north shore, the area is decidedly more urban than is typical of Staten Island, evinced in the architecture (predominantly tall brick buildings) and numerous retail stores and eateries. Unlike many other North Shore communities (and like Port Richmond), the neighborhood has no public housing projects. Its housing stock is dominated by single-family homes built in the first few decades of the 20th century.

== Demographics ==
For census purposes, the New York City Department of City Planning classifies Tompkinsville as part of a larger Neighborhood Tabulation Area called Tompkinsville-Stapleton-Clifton-Fox Hills SI0102. This designated neighborhood had 19,027 inhabitants based on data from the 2020 United States Census. This was an increase of 2,835 persons (17.5%) from the 16,192 counted in 2010. The neighborhood had a population density of 34.2 inhabitants per acre (14,500/sq mi; 5,600/km^{2}).

The racial makeup of the neighborhood was 15.8% (3,006) White (Non-Hispanic), 31.7% (6,031) Black (Non-Hispanic), 9.6% (1,828) Asian, and 4.2% (799) from two or more races. Hispanic or Latino of any race were 38.7% (7,363) of the population.

According to the 2020 United States Census, this area has many cultural communities of over 1,000 inhabitants. This include residents who identify as Mexican, Puerto Rican, African-American, and Chinese.

The largest age group was people 10-34 years old, which made up 37% of the residents. 65.0% of the households had at least one family present. Out of the 13,141 households, 30.5% had a married couple (14.0% with a child under 18), 6.7% had a cohabiting couple (3.1% with a child under 18), 24.8% had a single male (2.4% with a child under 18), and 38.0% had a single female (12.0% with a child under 18). 37.7% of households had children under 18. In this neighborhood, 71.2% of non-vacant housing units are renter-occupied.

The entirety of Community District 1, which comprises Tompkinsville and other neighborhoods on the North Shore, had 181,484 inhabitants as of NYC Health's 2018 Community Health Profile, with an average life expectancy of 79.0 years. This is lower than the median life expectancy of 81.2 for all New York City neighborhoods. Most inhabitants are youth and middle-aged adults: 24% are between the ages of between 0–17, 27% between 25 and 44, and 26% between 45 and 64. The ratio of college-aged and elderly residents was lower, at 10% and 13% respectively.

As of 2017, the median household income in Community District 1 was $48,018. In 2018, an estimated 21% of Tompkinsville and the North Shore residents lived in poverty, compared to 17% in all of Staten Island and 20% in all of New York City. One in fourteen residents (7%) were unemployed, compared to 6% in Staten Island and 9% in New York City. Rent burden, or the percentage of residents who have difficulty paying their rent, is 51% in Tompkinsville and the North Shore, compared to the boroughwide and citywide rates of 49% and 51% respectively. Based on this calculation, as of 2018, Stapleton and the North Shore are considered high-income relative to the rest of the city and not gentrifying.

The neighborhood is mixed commercial and residential. Like many areas of the northeastern part of the island, it suffered a decline following the construction of the Verrazzano–Narrows Bridge in 1964, which shifted the commercial activity of the island towards its interior. Recent plans have called for the redevelopment of the harbor front area.

== Transportation ==
The Tompkinsville station of the Staten Island Railway is one stop south of the terminus at St. George. Unlike at the majority of the railway's stations, a MetroCard or OMNY must be used to enter or exit at Tompkinsville. Faregates were installed at the station in 2009 to deter fare avoiders who would exit at the station to avoid paying the fare at St. George.
