= United States Army Band =

The United States Army Band
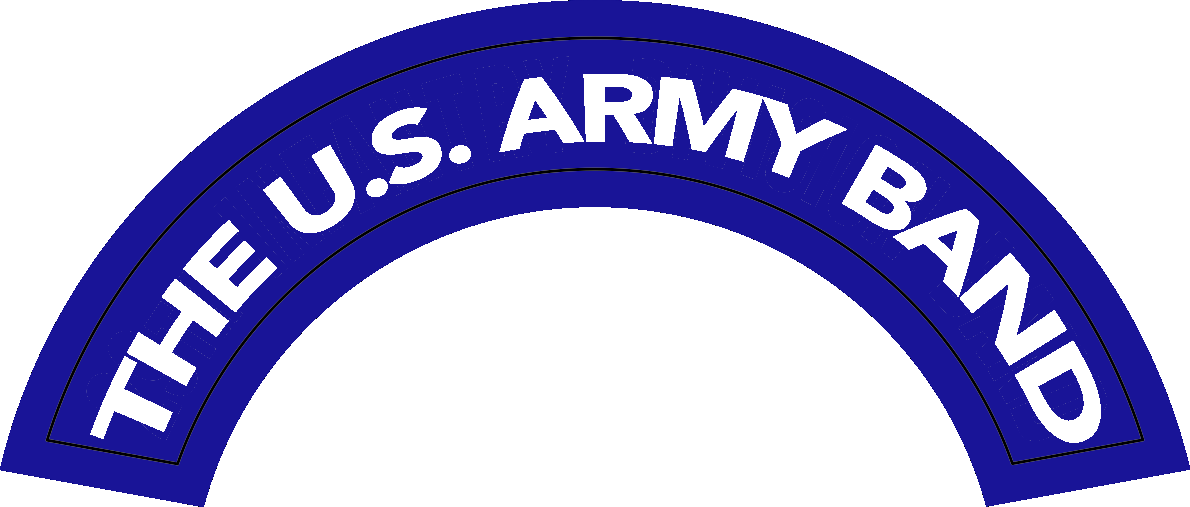
- The U.S. Army Band Shoulder Sleeve Insignia
- Active: 25 January 1922 – present
- Country: United States of America
- Branch: United States Army
- Garrison/HQ: Fort Myer
- Nickname: "Pershing's Own"
- March: "The Army Goes Rolling Along"
- Decorations: Superior Unit Award with Oak Leaf
- Website: www.USArmyBand.com

Commanders
- Current commander: COL Scott McKenzie
- Deputy Commander: MAJ Richard Viglucci
- Executive Officer: Vacant
- Associate Conductor: 1LT Bernardo Miethe
- Associate Conductor: 1LT Michael Hong
- Command Sergeant Major: CSM Marlisa del Cid Woods

Insignia
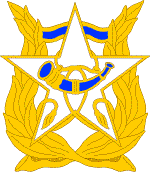
- Distinctive unit insignia

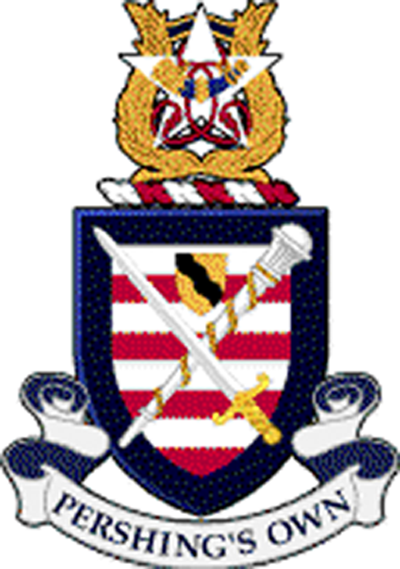
- Coat of arms

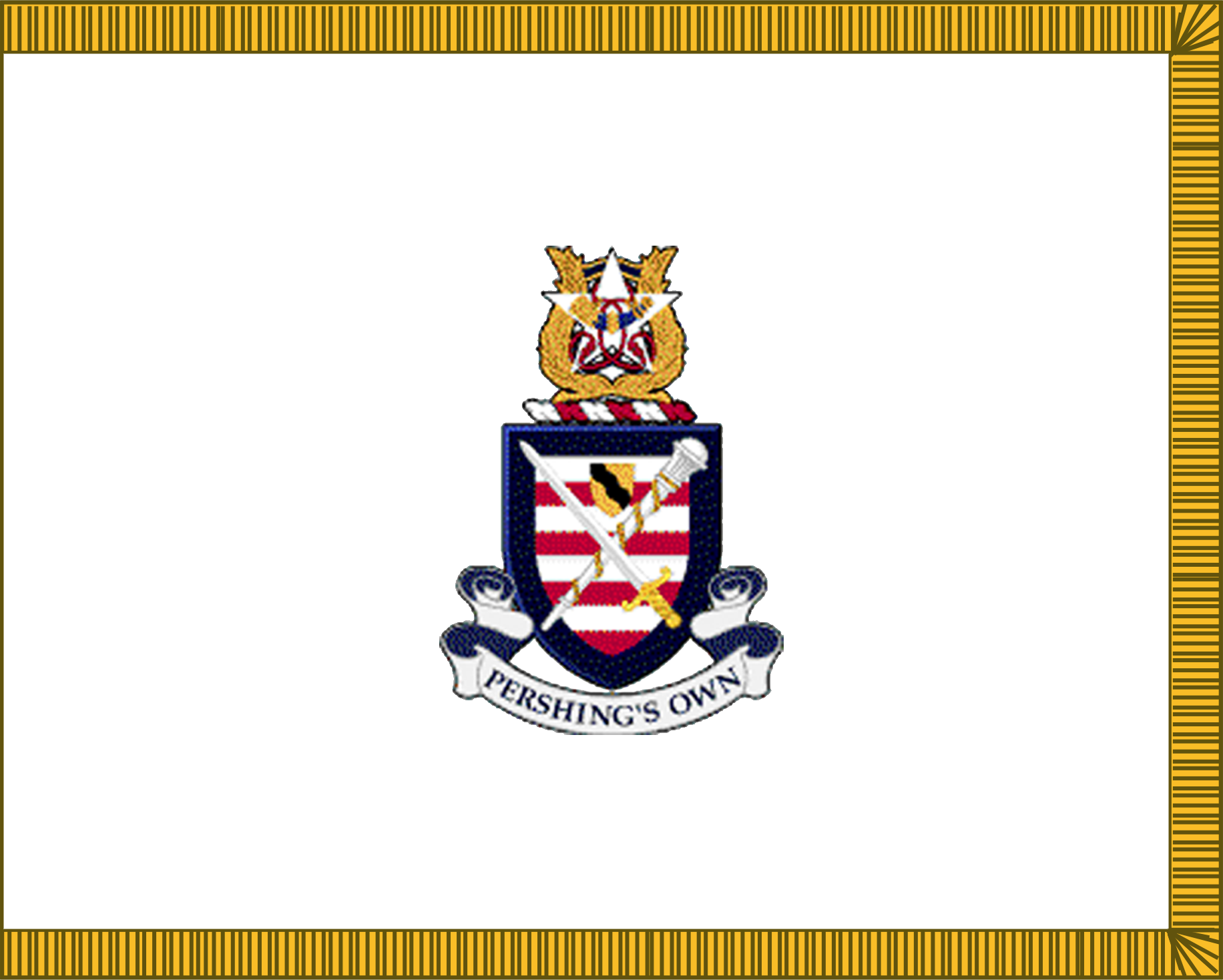
- US Army Band Flag

The United States Army Band, also known as "Pershing's Own", is the premier musical organization of the United States Army, founded in 1922. There are currently seven official performing ensembles in the unit: The U.S. Army Concert Band, The U.S. Army Ceremonial Band, The U.S. Army Chorus, The U.S. Army Blues, The U.S. Army Band Downrange, The U.S. Army Herald Trumpets, and The U.S. Army Strings.

== History ==
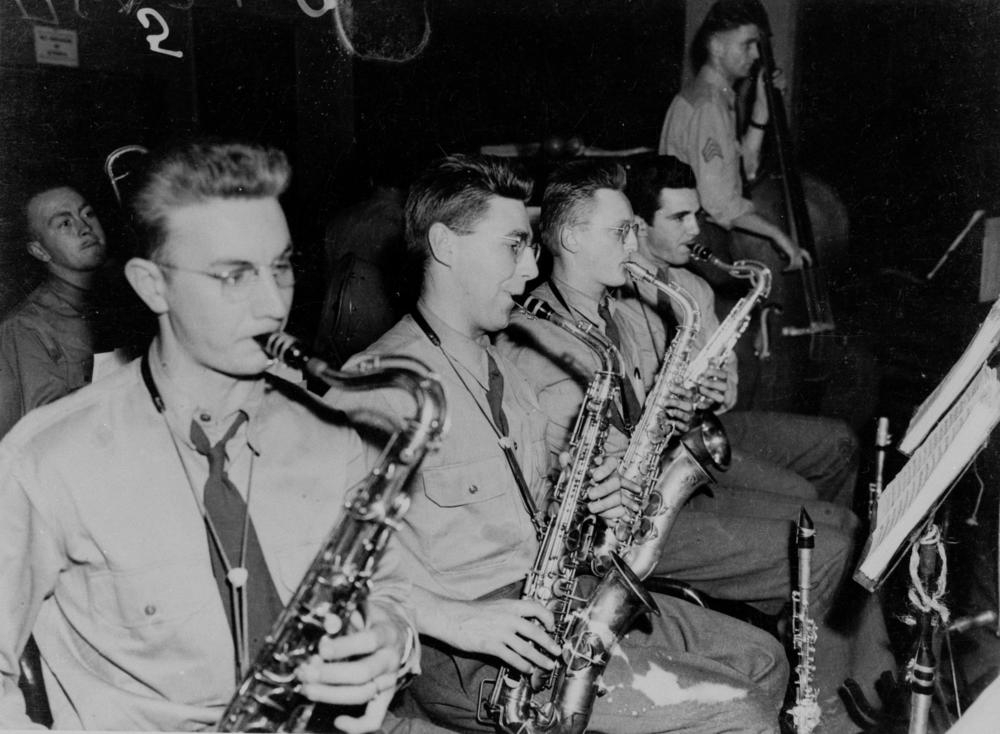
The United States Army Band saxophonists playing in Brisbane, Australia, ca. 1942

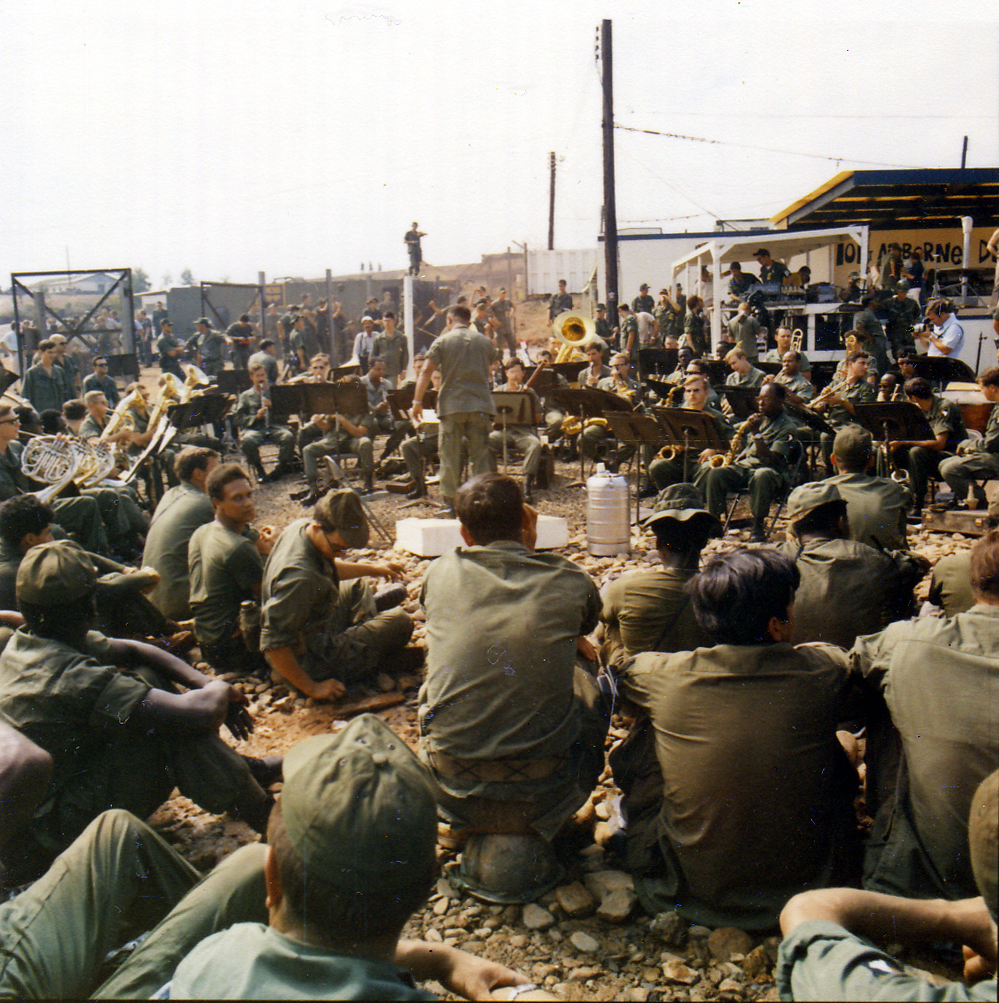
The United States Army Band plays Christmas music at the Tan Son Nhut Air Base in Vietnam during the holiday season in late December 1970

The United States Army Band was established on 25 January 1922 by General of the Armies John J. Pershing, Army Chief of Staff in emulation of European military bands he heard during World War I. In its early years, the band was featured on RCA, CBS, the Mutual Broadcasting Network, and other networks. The band also completed four national tours between 1928 and 1931 and was noted for its professionalism during a trip to Spain for the Ibero-American Exposition of 1929.

In June 1943, the United States Army Band was called overseas to perform in North Africa and in Europe during World War II. The band received a campaign streamer for their efforts during the Rhineland Campaign. This period also saw the band perform with numerous well-known artists and composers, many as part of the very successful Freedom Sings concert series that started in 1950 and continued for several years. Notable musicians included Metropolitan Opera bass Jerome Hines, composers Paul Hindemith and Percy Grainger, and the pianist duo Whittmore and Lowe. Similarly, several well-known entertainers and recording artists were band members during this period. Eddie Fisher, Robert Dini, and Steve Lawrence were very popular during the 1950s, as were harpist Lloyd Lindroth, future Metropolitan Opera tenor George Shirley, and announcer Charles Osgood.

Throughout the 1960s, 1970s and 1980s, the United States Army Band continued to perform and serve with distinction. In 1963, the band participated in the state funeral of John F. Kennedy with Army Band Bugler Keith Clark performing "Taps" during final interment at Arlington National Cemetery. Brucker Hall, the band's training and performance facility, was constructed in the mid-1970s. Also during this era, the Army Blues, the Army Brass Quintet, the Army Chorale (now operating as 'Downrange'), and the Army Brass Band were officially established as regular performing ensembles. An official Coat of Arms and distinctive uniforms were approved to reflect the band's increasing visibility at events of national significance, including the visit of Emperor Hirohito to Alaska with President Richard Nixon, the United States Bicentennial in 1976, the Lake Placid Winter Olympics 1980, the return of hostages during the Iran Hostage Crisis, the 1982 World's Fair in Knoxville, Tennessee, and the 1984 Olympic Games in Los Angeles.

The United States Army Band has performed in Canada, Japan, and Australia as well as in several of the nation's prominent concert halls, such as Carnegie Hall, Radio City Music Hall, and the Guggenheim Band Shell at Lincoln Center in New York City, the Hollywood Bowl in Los Angeles, and the Hatch Shell in Boston. In 1984, the band recorded and participated in the filming of Francis Ford Coppola's movie Gardens of Stone.

Under the leadership of Colonel L. Bryan Shelburne, leader and commander (1990–2000), the band continued with performances at the 1990 Economic Summit in Houston, the Desert Storm Victory Parade in New York City, and Reba McEntire's Christmas Special in Nashville. Col. Shelburne also led the band in performances in Sweden, the Netherlands, Turkey, Nova Scotia, Scotland, and a concert of International Goodwill with the Soviet Union's Navy Band in Stockholm.

In November 1997, the United States Army Band put on a grand concert at Carnegie Hall in New York City. Guest artists included Walter Cronkite, Charles Osgood, and Metropolitan Opera stars Roberta Peters and John Cheek.

In December 2002, a ten-piece pop group from the band, dubbed "Downrange", accompanied country musician Darryl Worley, comedian Kathy Griffin, actress Karri Turner, pro wrestler Bradshaw, and two cheerleaders from the Jacksonville Jaguars to Uzbekistan, Kuwait, and Afghanistan as part of a pre-Christmas USO tour in support of Operation Enduring Freedom. This was the first time since 1945 that members of the band performed in a theater of foreign operations. Since the commencement of Operation Iraqi Freedom in 2003, the tour has been repeated annually under the title "Hope and Freedom", with a larger ensemble and additional stops at military positions in Iraq. Other celebrities that have accompanied recent tours include country singer Mark Wills, comedian Al Franken, and cheerleaders from the Washington Redskins.

Colonel Lamb retired in June 2005 and was succeeded by Colonel Thomas Rotondi Jr., whose previous assignment was Commander/Conductor of the United States Military Academy Band in West Point, New York.

The United States Army Band is headquartered at Fort Myer in Arlington, Virginia, and annually hosts The United States Army Band Tuba-Euphonium Conference in January and Eastern Trombone Workshop in March.

== Leaders ==
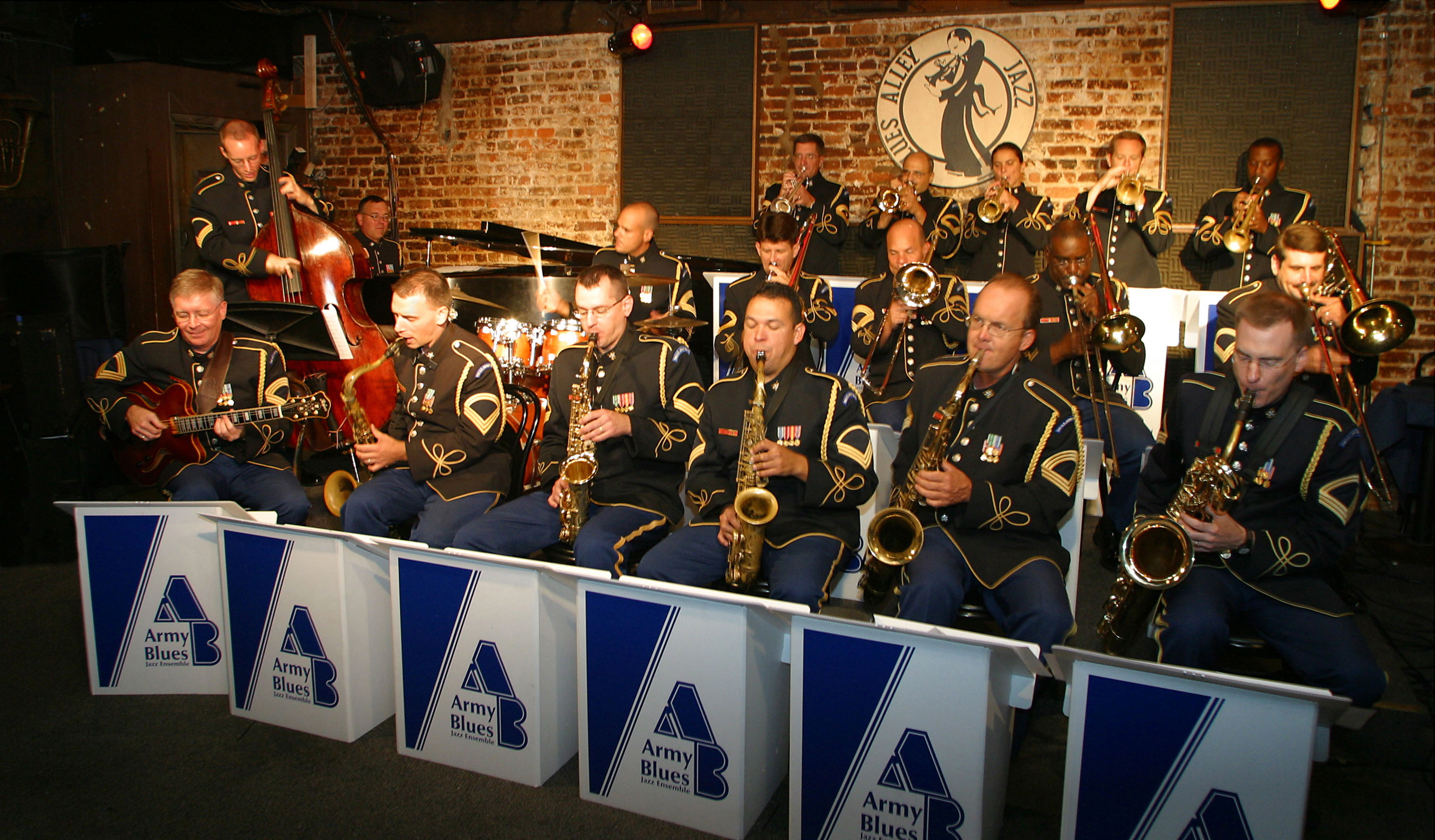
The Army Blues during a sit down performance in 2008

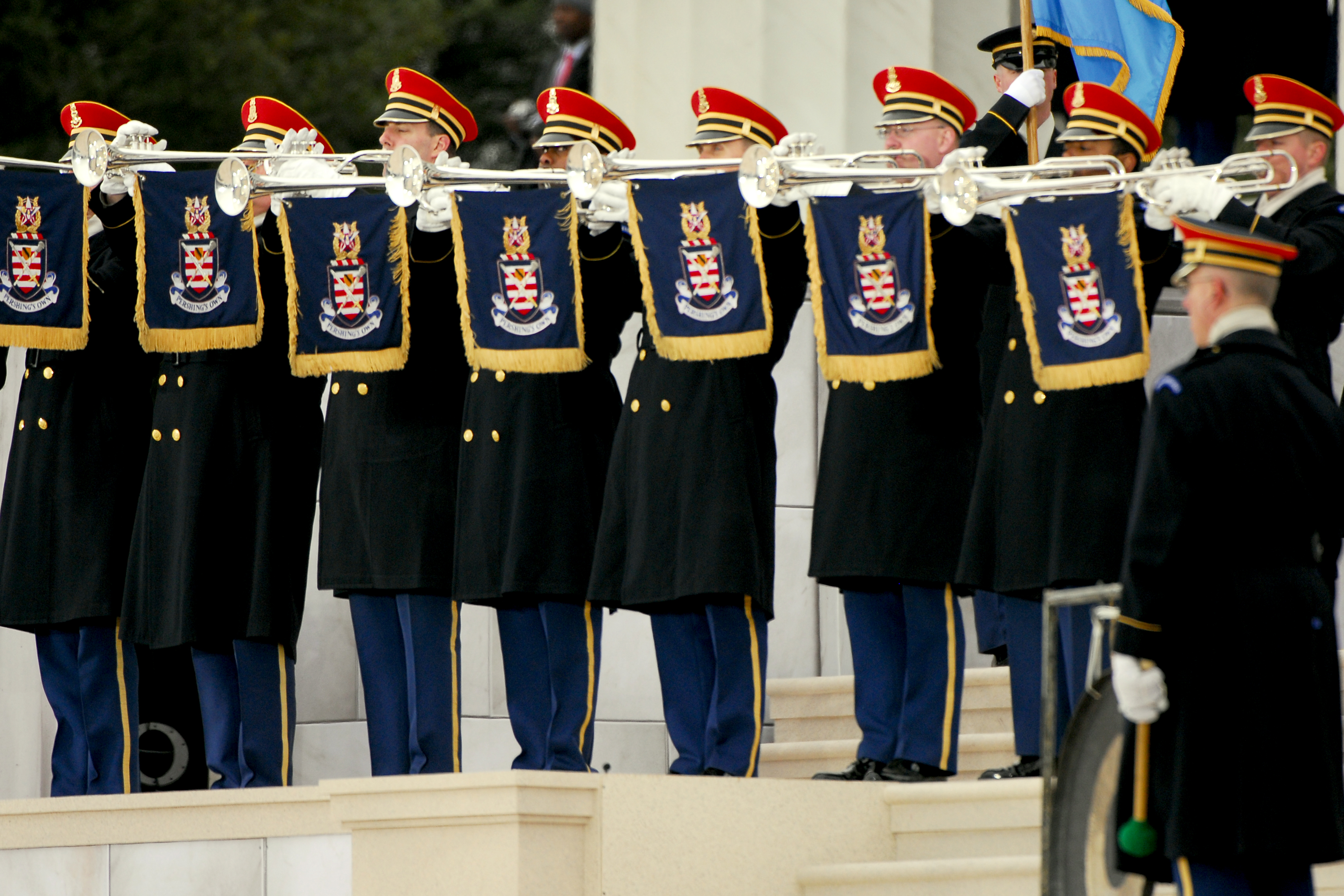
The Army Herald Trumpets, the official fanfare ensemble for the President of the United States, in 2009

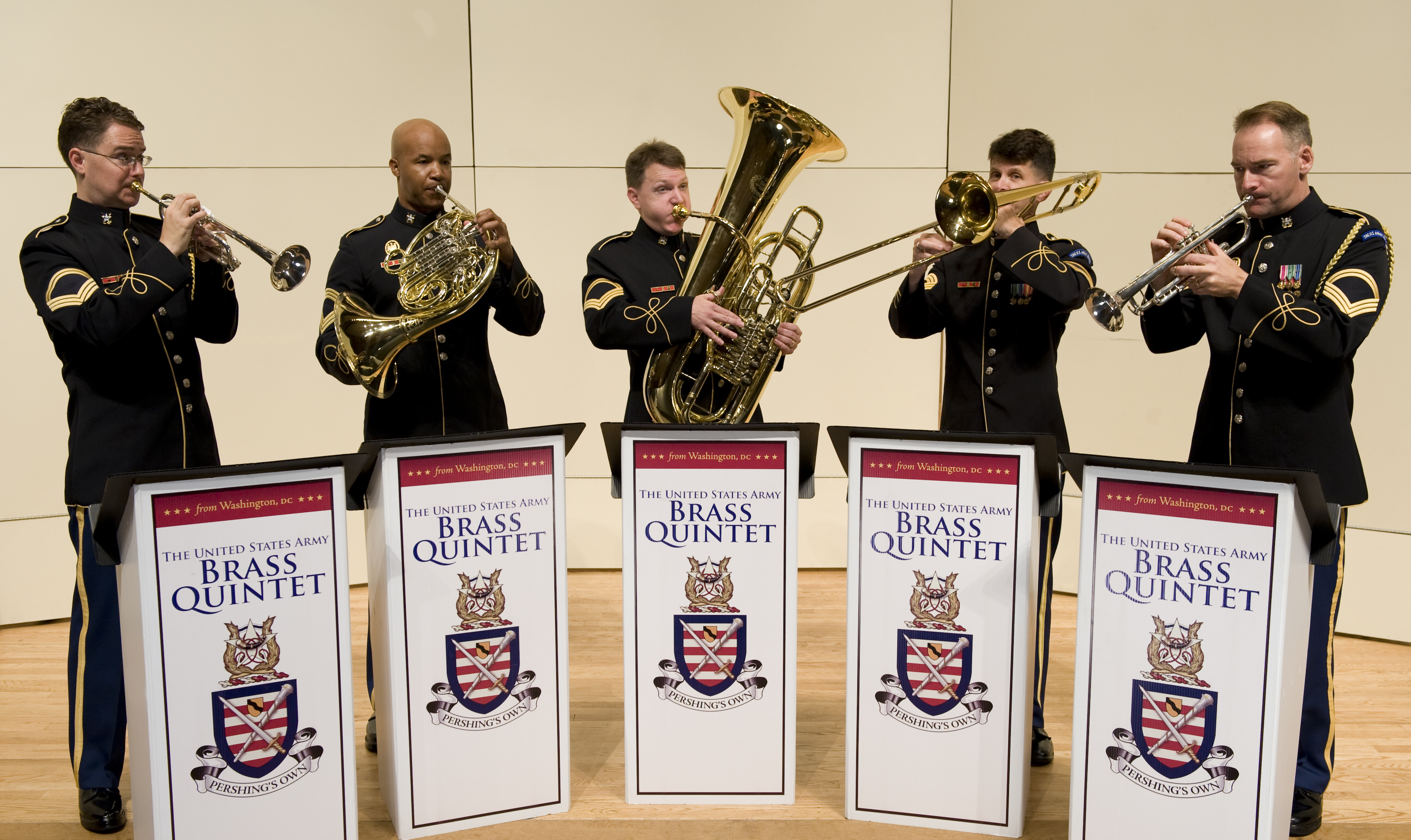
The Army Brass Quintet during a performance in 2010

Date	Portrait	Name
1922		Warrant Officer Francis Leigh
1923–1935		Warrant Officer William J. Stannard
1935–1946		Captain Thomas F. Darcy Jr.
1946–1964		Lieutenant Hugh J. Curry
1964–1976		Colonel Samuel R. Loboda
1976–1990		Colonel Eugene W. Allen
1990–2000		Colonel L. Bryan Shelburne Jr.
2000–2005		Colonel Gary F. Lamb
2005–2011		Colonel Thomas Rotondi Jr.
2011–2014		Colonel Thomas H. Palmatier
2014-2017		Colonel Timothy J. Holtan
2017–2022		Colonel Andrew J. Esch
2022–2026		Colonel Bruce R. Pulver
2026-		Colonel Scott McKenzie

== Lineage ==
- Organized 22 January 1922 at Fort Hunt, Virginia, as The Army Band
- Discontinued 31 January 1948 at Fort Myer, Virginia
- Re-constituted 17 August 1949 in the Regular Army; concurrently consolidated with the United States Army Band (active) (constituted 8 January 1948 in the Regular Army; activated 31 January 1948 at Fort Myer, Virginia) and consolidated unit designated as The United States Army Band.

== Honors ==
=== Campaign participation credit ===
- World War II:
1. Rhineland Campaign

=== Decorations ===
1. Meritorious Unit Commendation (Army) for WASHINGTON, DC 1969–1971
2. Meritorious Unit Commendation (Army) for WASHINGTON, DC 1971–1973
3. Army Superior Unit Award for 1987
4. Army Superior Unit Award for 1992–1993

== Media ==
=== Video ===
"Hail to the Chief", the official fanfare for the President of the United States, performed by the Army Herald Trumpets

Pyotr Ilyich Tchaikovsky's 1812 Overture performed by the Army Concert Band and Army Chorus, led by Colonel Thomas Rotondi Jr.

=== Audio ===
The Army Goes Rolling Along
Edmund L. Gruber's "The Army Goes Rolling Along", official hymn of the United States Army, performed by the U.S. Army Ceremonial Band

Army Blue
Performed by the U.S. Army Ceremonial Band

National Emblem
Edwin Eugene Bagley's "National Emblem", performed by the U.S. Army Ceremonial Band.

The British Grenadiers
"The British Grenadiers", performed by the U.S. Army Strings

Four ruffles and flourishes; and Hail to the Chief (long version)
Four ruffles and flourishes, followed by James Sanderson's "Hail to the Chief", performed by the U.S. Army Herald Trumpets

Flight of the Bumblebee
Nikolai Rimsky-Korsakov's orchestral interlude "Flight of the Bumblebee", performed by the U.S. Army Strings

America the Beautiful
Samuel A. Ward's "America the Beautiful", performed by the U.S. Army Brass Quintet

Overture to The Marriage of Figaro
Mozart's overture to The Marriage of Figaro, performed by the U.S. Army Brass Quintet

The Invincible Eagle
John Philip Sousa's "The Invincible Eagle", performed by the U.S. Army Ceremonial Band

The Rifle Regiment
Sousa's "The Rifle Regiment", performed by the U.S. Army Concert Band

Es ist ein Ros entsprungen
"Es ist ein Ros entsprungen", also known as "Lo, How a Rose E'er Blooming", performed by the U.S. Army Chorus

National Spirit March
Silas Erly Hummel's "National Spirit March", performed by the U.S. Army Ceremonial Band

Washington Grays
Claudio S. Grafulla's "Washington Grays", performed by the U.S. Army Ceremonial Band

1812 Overture
Tchaikovsky's "1812 Overture", performed by the U.S. Army Concert Band

Souvenir de Florence
Tchaikovsky's "Souvenir de Florence", third movement, performed by the U.S. Army Strings

== See also ==
- United States military bands
