= Eastern Trombone Workshop =

The ETW logo

The Eastern Trombone Workshop (ETW) has become one of the largest annual events for trombone in the world. The workshop's mission is to give students, performers, and educators an opportunity to meet and share ideas, talents, and opinions about the world of trombone. ETW regularly hosts participants throughout the nation and abroad. The workshop is held at Brucker Hall—The U.S. Army Band's state-of-the-art performance center—located on historic Fort Myer, Virginia, just across the Potomac River from Washington, D.C.

ETW is the only professionally organized and staffed trombone workshop or conference in the United States. Soloists, educators, and students, as well as university and college trombone ensembles from around the world, attend the workshop annually.

The workshop hosts a number of solo and ensemble competitions for performers of all ages. Over 1,000 students and professional trombonists have submitted audition tapes for the various competitions sponsored by ETW since 1993. Competitions include the National Solo Competition, the National Jazz Solo Competition, the National Jazz Ensemble Competition, and the National Trombone Quartet Competition.

Soloists have the opportunity to perform with the music ensembles from the U.S. Army Band to include the U.S. Army Orchestra, Concert Band, and Blues Jazz Ensemble.

All events are open and free to the public. Activities include concerts, master classes, recitals, lectures and clinics by the leading artists of the day. The workshop annually features premier performances of new works and arrangements for tenor and bass trombone.

There are no registration fees.

== History ==
In 1978, John Marcellus, former principal trombonist with the National Symphony Orchestra, along with John Melick, former trombone instructor at Towson State University, founded the Eastern Trombone Workshop at Towson State University in Baltimore, Maryland. In 1981 the workshop moved to Florida State University, under the direction of trombone instructor William Cramer. The U.S. Navy Band took control of the workshop in 1986, thus bringing the event to the Washington area.

In 1993, U.S. Army Band solo trombonist Scott Shelsea, with support of Colonel Bryan Shelburn, commander of the U.S. Army Band, took hold of the reins of ETW.
