= Thomas F. Darcy Jr. =

Thomas Francis Darcy Jr. (May 7, 1895 – May 19, 1968) was a composer and leader of the United States Army Band in Washington, D. C. from 1935 to 1946.

== Life ==
Darcy was born at Vancouver Barracks, Washington, where his father was on duty as an Army Band Leader.

He first enlisted in the Army, at Vancouver Barracks, on May 18, 1912, and served at various posts in this country and in foreign garrisons until he sailed for France with his regiment in June 1917.

He received his music training at the U.S. Army Bandmasters School in Chaumont, France, the Army Music School in Washington, D.C., and the Juilliard School of Music. He was associate conductor and cornet soloist with the official U.S. Army Band from 1924 to 1935 at which time he was promoted to leader of that organization. While living in Washington, D.C., Darcy became an authority on official ceremonies and music protocol; in 1940 he was appointed by the Secretary of War as "advisor on all band matters." In 1941 he became dean of the Army Bandmasters School, and two years later the band was transferred to General Eisenhower's Allied Expeditionary Force in Europe. During that duty tour Darcy conducted over 500 concerts in eight countries before he returned to the United States in 1945.

Darcy appeared in Jean Negulesco's short The United States Army Band (1943) as himself.

He died in Somerset, Pennsylvania.

== Works ==
=== Compositions ===
- Festival Overture
- Flashing Sabres
- Marche Fantastique
- March of the Free Peoples
- The National Geographic March
- Nocturne
- La Princesita
- Trio for trumpets
- Tripoli, cornet or trumpet trio with band
- The United States Army, march
- Vanguard of Victory
- Youth on Parade

=== Arrangements ===
- National anthem of Chile
- National anthem of Ecuador
- National anthem of Egypt
- National anthem of France
- National anthem of Paraguay
- National anthem of Peru
- National anthem of Syria
- National anthem of Uruguay
- National anthem of Venezuela
