= National Lighthouse Museum (New York City) =

Museum in Staten Island, New York

Coordinates: 40.64071°N 74.07499°W

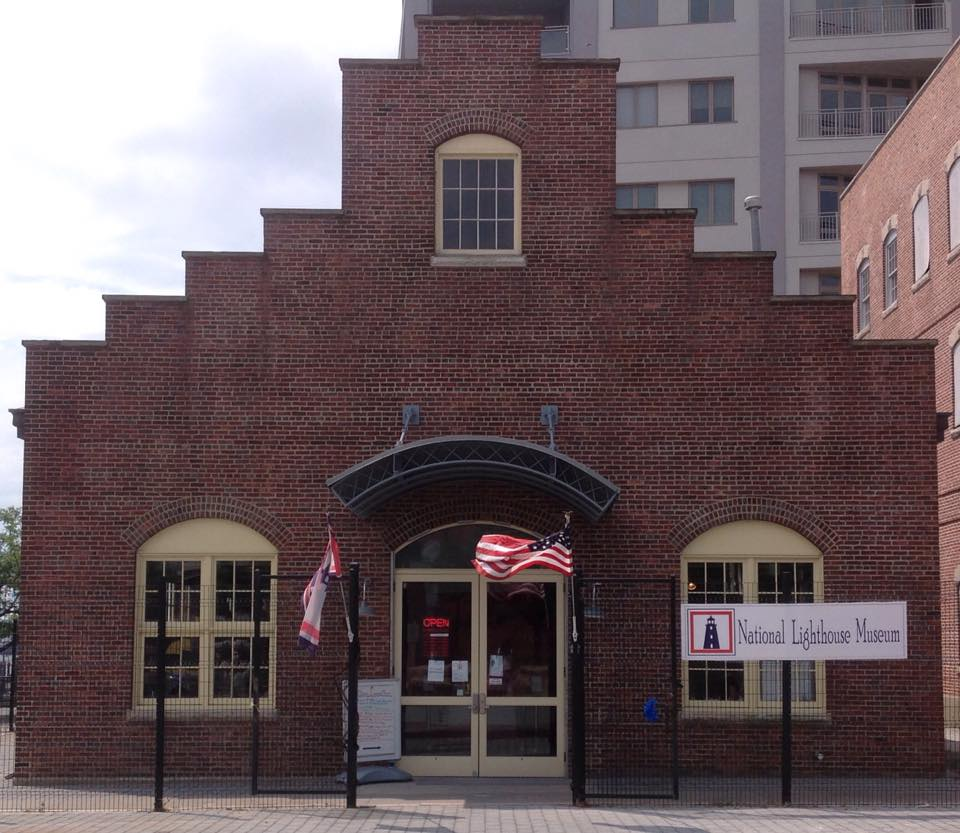
The Educational Resource Center at the National Lighthouse Museum.

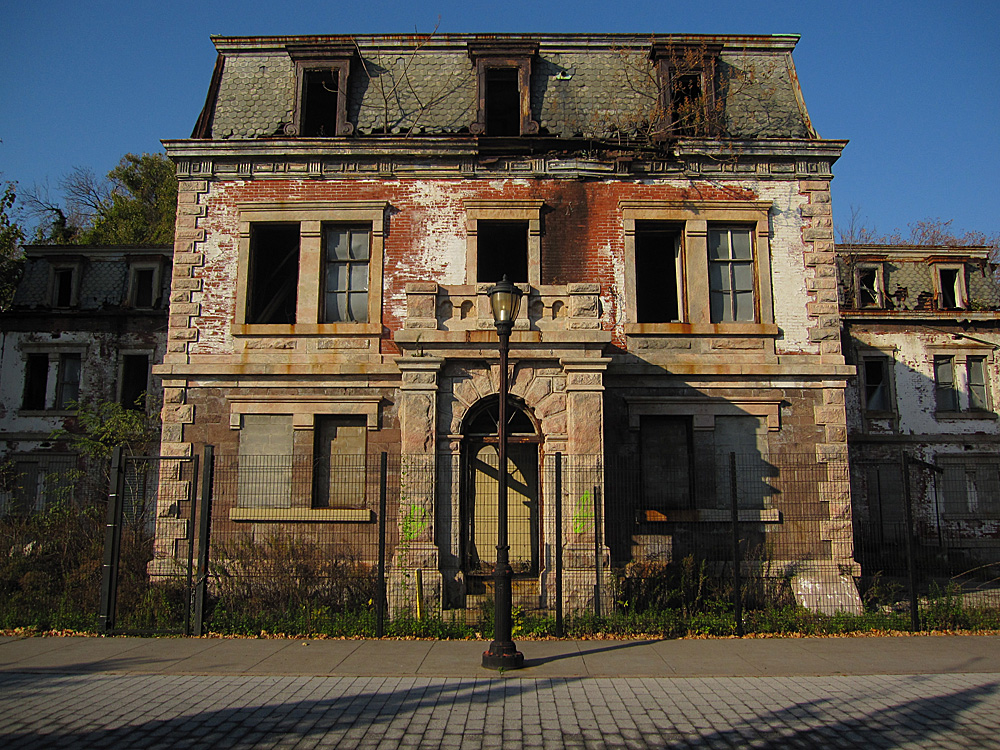
U.S. Lighthouse Service, Third District, Staten Island Depot Office Building

The National Lighthouse Museum is a museum in the St. George neighborhood of Staten Island, New York City, United States. Dedicated to the history of lighthouses and their keepers, it officially opened in 2015. The museum is located within the former Foundry Building of the United States Lighthouse Service General Depot, later the Staten Island Coast Guard Station.

== Site selection and opening ==
The American Lighthouse Coordinating Committee (ALCC) issued a nationwide Request for Proposals (RFP) for a National Lighthouse Center and Museum in 1998. The site selected was the St. George Coast Guard Station, a National Register of Historic Places listing and a city landmark, and the former location of the New York Marine Hospital and the Staten Island Quarantine War.

On November 9, 2001, the New York State Board of Regents issued a charter to the National Lighthouse Center and Museum. However, the museum had trouble raising funds: by 2000, it had raised only 2% of the $5 million necessary to start operations, despite being in the second year of a five-year fundraising drive. As a result, the museum opening was subsequently postponed from 2001 to 2003. The museum board was dissolved in 2009, with officials citing slow fundraising activity following the September 11 attacks in 2001, as well as the budget rising to $15 million. By that time, the New York City Economic Development Corporation (EDC) had spent $8 million on stabilizing the structures at the Coast Guard Station. In 2013, John Catsimatidis donated $105,000 toward the museum. The same year, the museum board was reconvened, and the EDC asked the board to procure $350,000 in exchange for the EDC renting out the foundry for the museum's use for $1 per year. The museum was finally opened in 2015 within the former foundry.
