= St. George Coast Guard Station =

Buildings in Staten Island, New York

- Office Building and U.S. Light-House Depot Complex
- U.S. National Register of Historic Places
- New York City Landmark
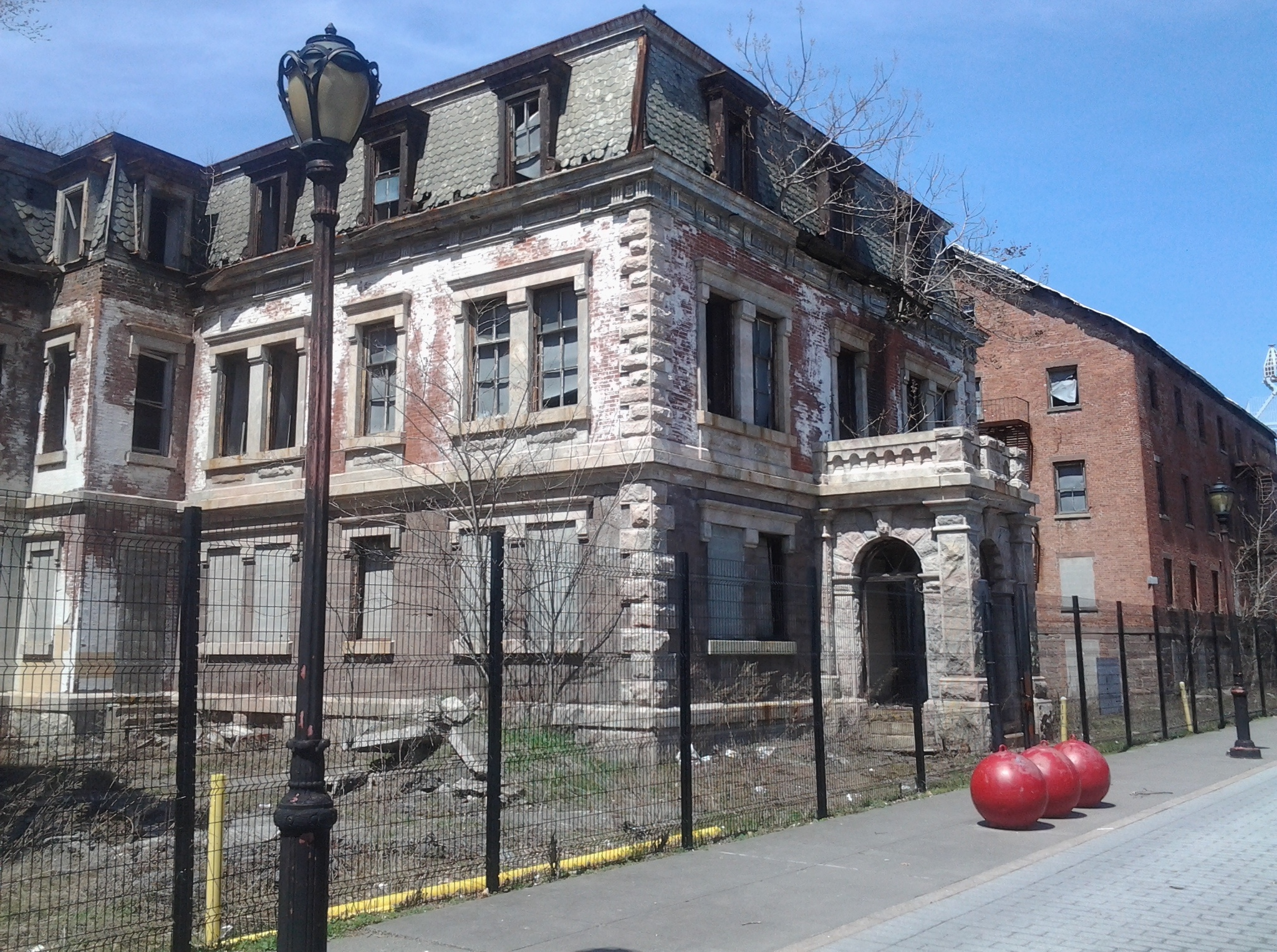
- 1869 Second Empire office building designed by Alfred B. Mullett as it appeared in 2014

- Location within New York City Location within New York Location within the United States
- Location: 1 Bay St., Staten Island, New York
- Coordinates: 40°38′28″N 74°4′30″W
- Area: 1.5 acres (0.61 ha)
- Built: 1840
- Architect: Alfred B. Mullett
- Architectural style: Greek Revival, Second Empire
- NRHP reference No.: 83001785

Significant dates
- Added to NRHP: September 15, 1983
- Designated NYCL: November 25, 1980

St. George Coast Guard Station (or the Staten Island Coast Guard Station) is a complex of 22 buildings near the St. George Terminal in Staten Island, New York City. It was best known for the invention and manufacturing of lighthouse equipment. The Office Building and U.S. Light-House Depot Complex, designed by Alfred B. Mullet and completed in 1865, are listed on the National Register of Historic Places, and comprise an official New York City Landmark.

In the late 1990s, New York City Economic Development Corporation (EDC) took over the site and created a public plaza; a public fishing pier (Pier 1); a fully functioning building that was supposed to house a gift shop for the National Lighthouse Museum. EDC also stabilized the building adjacent to the gift shop for the purpose of housing the museum's artifacts. In 2015 the National Lighthouse Museum opened within the complex. The Lighthouse Point development is also being constructed next to the historic building complex.

The site has views of the Verrazzano–Narrows Bridge, Brooklyn's Shore Parkway, Governors Island, and Manhattan. During the summer months, concerts and events sponsored by local organizations such as Staten Island Community Board 1 and the Downtown Staten Island Council attract tourists from the ferry as well as local residents.

== Complex ==
The Office Building and U.S. Light-House Depot Complex, also known as the Old Administration Building for the Third District U.S. Coast Guard, is a historic office building and light house repair depot complex. The complex consists of four buildings: the three-story brick and sandstone office building in the Second Empire style; two brick warehouses; and a small one-story brick building formerly used as a laboratory. The office building was designed by the Office of the Supervising Architect under Alfred B. Mullett in 1869. The warehouses were built about 1845 and in 1868. The older warehouse is in the Greek Revival style.

== United States Lighthouse Board ==
The office building was constructed during the time that U.S. lighthouses were administered by the United States Lighthouse Board, which had been founded in 1851 to improve lighthouse technology and management practices. The board divided the nation into 12 districts, each served by a depot where supplies for the district's lighthouses were stored, particularly the flammable fuels in use at that time, which required specialized handling. The depot in St. George, Staten Island served the Third Lighthouse District, which stretched from Maine to Delaware and thus included many of the best known and historic lights on the Eastern Seaboard, including Sandy Hook Light, Montauk Light, and Barnegat Light. Vaults for fuel storage remain on the depot property, and other supplies were stored in the warehouses. The laboratory building was used to research improved materials and techniques for use in U.S. lighthouses.

The functions of the Lighthouse Board were transferred to other U.S. government agencies starting in 1903, and ultimately to the U.S. Coast Guard in 1939.

== History ==
=== Site ===
The present site of the St. George Coast Guard Station was the location of the New York Marine Hospital, also known as the Quarantine, which opened in 1799 or 1800. Long before the construction of the immigrant processing center on the Battery, and later Ellis Island, immigrants found to be in poor or questionable health were segregated from other immigrants and from the local population in the hospital. The Quarantine was New York City’s first line of defense against immigrant-borne infectious diseases like Smallpox, Cholera, Typhus and Yellow fever. As many as 1,500 individuals could have been accommodated there at one time. After a series of epidemics in the 1850s, a riotous mob of locals burned the twenty buildings of the hospital complex to the ground in the Staten Island Quarantine War of 1858.

=== Founding and heyday ===
The Staten Island Lighthouse Depot was constructed on the former hospital site in 1862 by the United States Lighthouse Service (USLHS). It was the key manufacturing, storage, supply and maintenance center for the USLHS’s 3rd District.

Growing steadily in both size and capability during the late 19th and early 20th century, the Staten Island Depot reached its peak size during and after World War I. Two shops were constructed to handle the construction and maintenance of lightship lenses, most of which weighed thousands of pounds and were several feet tall. Subterranean storage areas, called "The Vaults", were built to store fuels and other combustible materials for lighthouses, and an entire machine shop and foundry where anchors, sinkers, chains, buoys, and lighthouse structural members were fabricated were all in full operation by the 1920s.

Advancing technology saw many lighthouses automated during the 1920s and 1930s and replaced with more reliable electronic beacons, something which heavily altered the scope of the Depot's mission as much of the upkeep, maintenance and lighthouse keeper supply work it performed was severely curtailed. This tail-off of work was checked by the massive increase in the use of Floating Aids-to-Navigation, or buoys. The Staten Island Depot's foundry became one of the key manufacturing and maintenance point for many of the buoys used along the East Coast of the United States, its quayside spaces became a forest of ocean buoys, channel markers, ice buoys, day-marks and their chains, anchors and sinkers.

=== Decline ===
With the USLHS's merger into the US Coast Guard in 1939, the Staten Island Depot continued its work, but during World War II it became more of a ship repair and outfitting space as many USCG Cutters, buoy tenders and harbor patrol craft called the Depot for wartime repainting, arming and voyage repairs. Following the war, the depot continued this work in addition to its maintenance and fabrication work and by 1950 it was one of the US Coast Guard's major supply depots in the Northeast.

Advancing technology again caught up with the Depot by the 1960s as all lighthouses had been automated with low-maintenance beacons, only two lightships were in service, and the amount of Buoy Tenders in USCG service began to drop as each ship became more operationally capable. Budget cuts and Consolidation in the late 1960s saw much of the Staten Island Depot's workload sent to the USCG Yard at Curtis Bay, Baltimore, Maryland. In 1966 the Coast Guard moved its remaining operations to Governors Island, and the site became surplus property.

It appears that little was done to safeguard the site from vandalism and the elements and it began to decay. The decline continued even after the Office Building was designated as a New York City landmark in 1980, and the entire site was listed on the National Register of Historic Places in 1983.

=== Redevelopment ===
In the late 1990s the New York City Economic Development Corporation (NYCEDC) acquired the property, and in 1998 the site was selected to be the site of the National Lighthouse Museum. By this time the buildings, having been abandoned for over thirty years, were in serious need of restoration. The museum resumed fundraising in 2010 and by early 2014 had raised over $400,000, enough to secure a short-term lease on the site's building 11, a 1912 machine shop on the boundary of the site. Fundraising for the museum continues. The museum originally planned to open in building 11 in August 2014, but ultimately its opening was delayed until the next year.

As of 2014, the other historic structures, including the office building, were fenced off and in near-ruined condition. In April 2014, the NYCEDC and developer Triangle Equities jointly announced a plan to build a complex, to be completed in 2019 and to be known as Lighthouse Point, that would incorporate the existing historic structures and would include hotel, residential, and retail uses. Work started in 2016 and Lighthouse Point's opening was subsequently pushed back to 2020. However, the developer filed for bankruptcy in September 2019, delaying the complex's opening, and the COVID-19 pandemic pushed back work further. Work on Lighthouse Point resumed in 2022. A housing lottery for Lighthouse Point was launched in November 2024, and rentals of apartments there began in April 2025. The building opened June 5, 2025.

The remaining buildings in the St. George Coast Guard Station complex remained unused and dilapidated as of December 2025. Although the NYCEDC and Triangle Equities were negotiating to find a use for the remaining buildings, the redevelopment plans had been hampered by the pandemic and increasing costs.

== See also ==
- National Register of Historic Places listings in Staten Island
- List of New York City Designated Landmarks in Staten Island
