= Washington Grays (song) =

American military march from 1861

Washington Grays
Performed by the United States Air Force Concert Band in 1998.

Washington Grays is an American march composed by Claudio S. Grafulla in 1861. It is a mainstay of both the parade and concert band march repertoire.

Grafulla's most popular piece was composed for the 8th Regiment, a New York state militia based at the Kingsbridge Armory in the Bronx. The term "Grays" in the title refers to the color of the regimental uniforms. The band books of the American Civil War (including the Port Royal Band Books arranged by Grafulla) included many charts of the prolific composer's music, including this composition.

There are elements of the Italian and German march in Washington Grays, with running sixteenth notes and responding bass voices creating a counterpoint. Washington Grays breaks the march formula by containing no introduction, break strain, or stinger. Frederick Fennell wrote of this march: "Masterfully simple, effectively contrasting, its incessant flow of musical ideas is overwhelmingly convincing. It is a march of great passion – no introduction, no break strain, no stinger. A real indoor rouser from 1861." This march represents technical difficulties for band members (it is graded a "5" in a system of "1" being the easiest and "6" the most difficult). The music for the clarinet and E♭ cornet players is particularly challenging.

The popularity of Washington Grays is due in considerable part to its early arranger. The Canadian Louis-Philippe Laurendeau (1861–1916) (using the pseudonym G. H. Reeves) made a modern concert band arrangement for Carl Fischer from brass band parts in 1905. Others who have made arrangements and editions include Frederick Fennell and Loras John Schissel. The duration of the march is between three and a half minutes to four minutes.

== First Recording ==
Washington Grays was likely first recorded by Arthur Pryor's Band by the Victor Talking Machine Company in Camden, New Jersey, recorded on March 30, 1909 (Encyclopedic Discography of Victor Recordings).

== Washington Grays or Washington Greys ==
The march is titled both ways (just as the color can be spelled "gray" or "grey"). The Library of Congress' Catalogue of Copyright Entries uses both "Grays" and "Greys" for different arrangements of the march. Music publishers use both titles. Carl Fischer uses "Grays" and Barnhouse uses "Greys", while Kalmus uses both spellings. "Grays" is used for this article because it is used much more frequently in cataloging the scores and recordings of the march. (Note: Note, however, that the name of the regiment was spelled the "Washington Greys" by the New York Times (August 10, 1859) – "The Washington Greys, of New York, in Boston." The Washington Grays Monument also represents a regiment in Philadelphia.)

== See also ==
- Joyce's 71st New York Regiment March
