= Claudio S. Grafulla =

Spanish-American composer

- Born: Claudio Simón Grafulla Morales; October 31, 1812; Mahón, Balearic Islands, Spain
- Died: December 5, 1880 (aged 68) Manhattan, New York City, U.S.
- Genres: Band music, classical music
- Occupations: Composer, conductor

Washington Grays (1861)
Washington Grays, performed by the United States Air Force Concert Band in 1998.

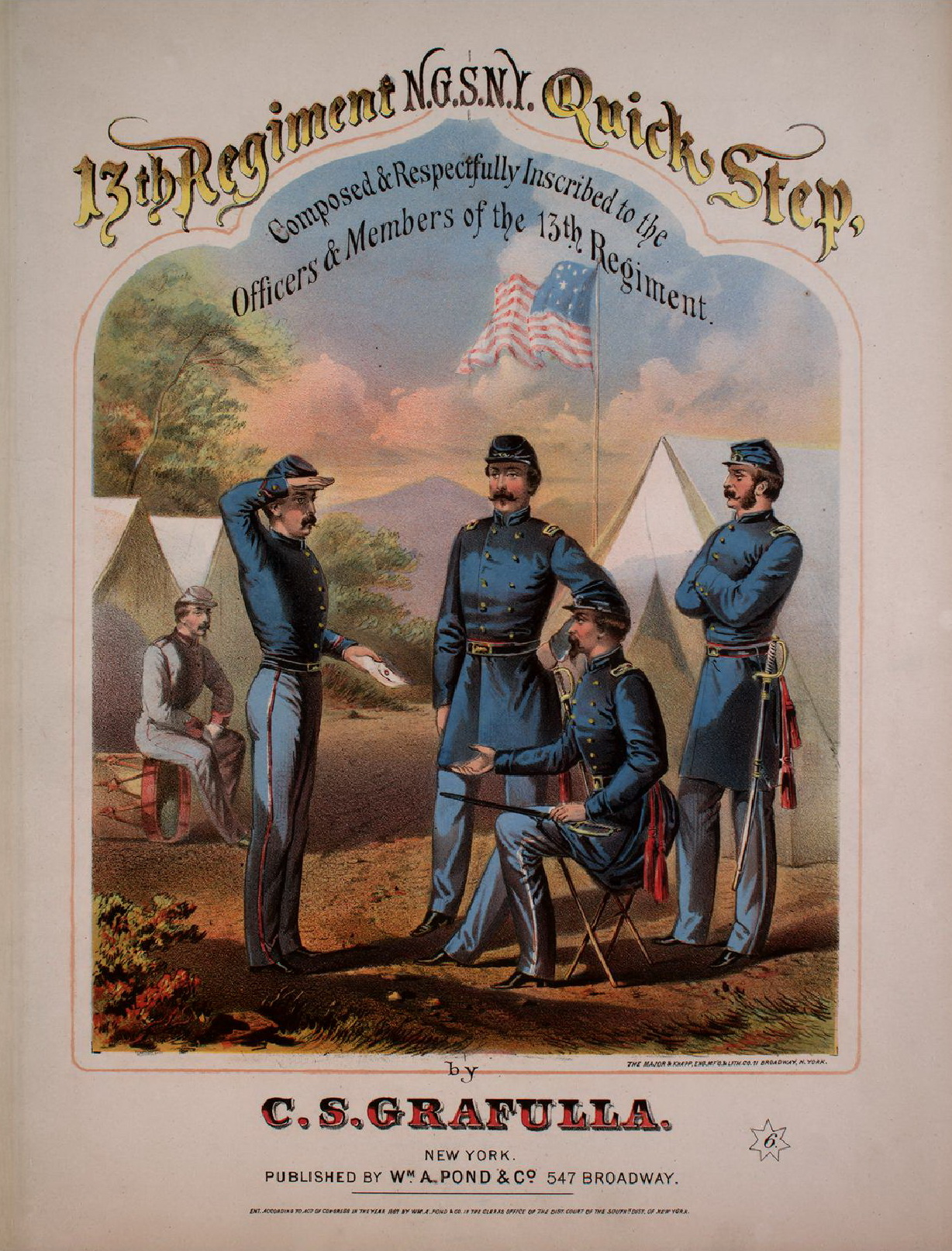
Cover Sheet of the 13th Regiment Quick Step (1867)

Claudio S. Grafulla (1812–1880) was a composer in the United States during the 19th Century, most noted for martial music for regimental bands during the early days of the American Civil War.

== Biography ==
Grafulla was born on October 31, 1812 on Menorca, an island off the coast of Spain that was occupied by the British after the Napoleonic Wars. At the age of 28, he emigrated to the United States, where he became a French horn player in Napier Lothian's New York Brass Band in New York City. This band was attached to the 7th Regiment of the New York National Guard, which was honored in 1922 by John Philip Sousa's The Gallant Seventh march. In 1860, he added woodwinds to a reorganized band and continued to serve as its director until his death at New York on December 2, 1880.

Grafulla was a quiet, unassuming man who never married; his whole life centered on his music. His remarkable technical and musical skills allowed him to become well known as a composer, often writing music to order, and as an arranger. As a director of the 7th Regiment Band, his fame spread widely.

Grafulla was a member of William Magear "Boss" Tweed's exclusive Americus Club. He performed regularly at Americus Club events, and his close relationship with Tweed is expressed on the cover of his sheet music for "Solid Men to the Front," which features a portrait of Tweed with the legend "composed and dedicated to Hon. William M. Tweed."

Grafulla composed Washington Grays in 1861 for the 8th Regiment, New York State Militia. This work has been called a march masterpiece, a band classic, and the prototype of the concert march. Showing the stylistic influence of both German and Italian marches, the march has a marvelous balance of technique and melody in a continuous flow of musical ideas. It dared to break the old formulas, however, because it has no introduction, no break strain, and no stinger.

Curiously, long after Grafulla's death, during the presidential contest of 1896, while McKinley and Bryan were debating the burning issue of a silver vs. gold monetary standard, his publishers issued a Solid Money March under the palindrome, "C.S.Allufarg".

Some of Grafulla's works, including "Parade" and "Freischutz Quickstep", were heard in the 1990 Ken Burns PBS miniseries, The Civil War.
