= Cornell 1964 =

Live album by Charles Mingus Sextet with Eric Dolphy
- Released: 2007
- Recorded: March 18, 1964
- Venues: Cornell University, Ithaca, NY
- Genres: Jazz, Post-bop
- Label: Blue Note
- Producers: Michael Cuscuna, Sue Mingus

Charles Mingus chronology
Reincarnation of a Lovebird (1987)	Cornell 1964 (2007)

Professional ratings
Review scores
Source	Rating
AllMusic	5/5 stars
The Penguin Guide to Jazz Recordings	3.5/4 stars
Pitchfork	8.9/10

Cornell 1964 is a live album by jazz bassist and composer Charles Mingus, featuring multi-instrumentalist Eric Dolphy. It was recorded at Cornell University in Ithaca, New York, on March 18, 1964.

The recordings of this concert were thought to be lost for many years, until they were re-discovered by Mingus' widow Sue, and were subsequently released for the first time in 2007 on the Blue Note label, initially as a 2-CD set.

== Track listing ==
All pieces composed by Charles Mingus, except where noted.

CD 1

1. "Opening" – 0:16
2. "ATFW You" (Byard) – 4:26
3. "Sophisticated Lady" (Duke Ellington, Irving Mills, Mitchell Parish) – 4:23
4. "Fables of Faubus" – 29:41
5. "Orange Was the Colour of Her Dress, Then Blue Silk" – 15:05
6. "Take the 'A' Train" (Billy Strayhorn) – 17:26

CD 2

1. "Meditations" – 31:23
2. "So Long Eric" – 15:33
3. "When Irish Eyes Are Smiling" (Chauncey Olcott, George Graff Jr., Ernest Ball) – 6:06
4. "Jitterbug Waltz" (Fats Waller) – 9:58

== Personnel ==
- Charles Mingus – double bass
- Eric Dolphy – alto saxophone, bass clarinet, flute
- Johnny Coles – trumpet
- Clifford Jordan – tenor saxophone
- Jaki Byard – piano
- Dannie Richmond – drums
