= Running Out of Time =

Running Out of Time may refer to:

== Film ==
- Running Out of Time (1994 film) or Días contados, a Spanish thriller directed by Imanol Uribe
- Running Out of Time (1999 film), a Hong Kong film directed by Johnnie To

== Literature ==
- Running Out of Time (novel), a 1996 novel by Margaret Peterson Haddix
- Running Out of Time, a 1993 novel by Betsy Struthers

== Music ==
- Running Out of Time, an album by the Daniel Band, 1987

=== Songs ===
- "Running Out of Time" (song), by Paramore, 2023
- "Running Out of Time", by Bucks Fizz from Hand Cut, 1983
- "Running Out of Time", by Dead Moon
- "Running Out of Time", by Hot Hot Heat from Elevator, 2005
- "Running Out of Time", by Lil Yachty from Let's Start Here, 2023
- "Running Out of Time", by Lin-Manuel Miranda from the Vivo film soundtrack, 2021
- "Running Out of Time", by MxPx from Let's Rock, 2006
- "Running Out of Time", by Ozzy Osbourne from Down to Earth, 2001
- "Running Out of Time", by Sean Paul from Imperial Blaze, 2009
- "Running Out of Time", by Simple Plan from Simple Plan, 2008
- "Running Out of Time", by Status Quo from Backbone, 2019
- "Running Out of Time", by Toto from Toto XIV, 2015
- "Running Out of Time", by Tyler, the Creator from Igor, 2019
- "Runnin Outta Time", by Future and Metro Boomin from We Don't Trust You, 2024

== Other uses ==
- Running Out of Time (relay), a 2022 relay event used to promote discussion about climate change
- "Running Out of Time" (Sonic X), a 2004 television episode

== See also ==
- Out of Time (disambiguation)
- Time Is Running Out (disambiguation)
