= There's a Red-Bordered Flag in the Window =

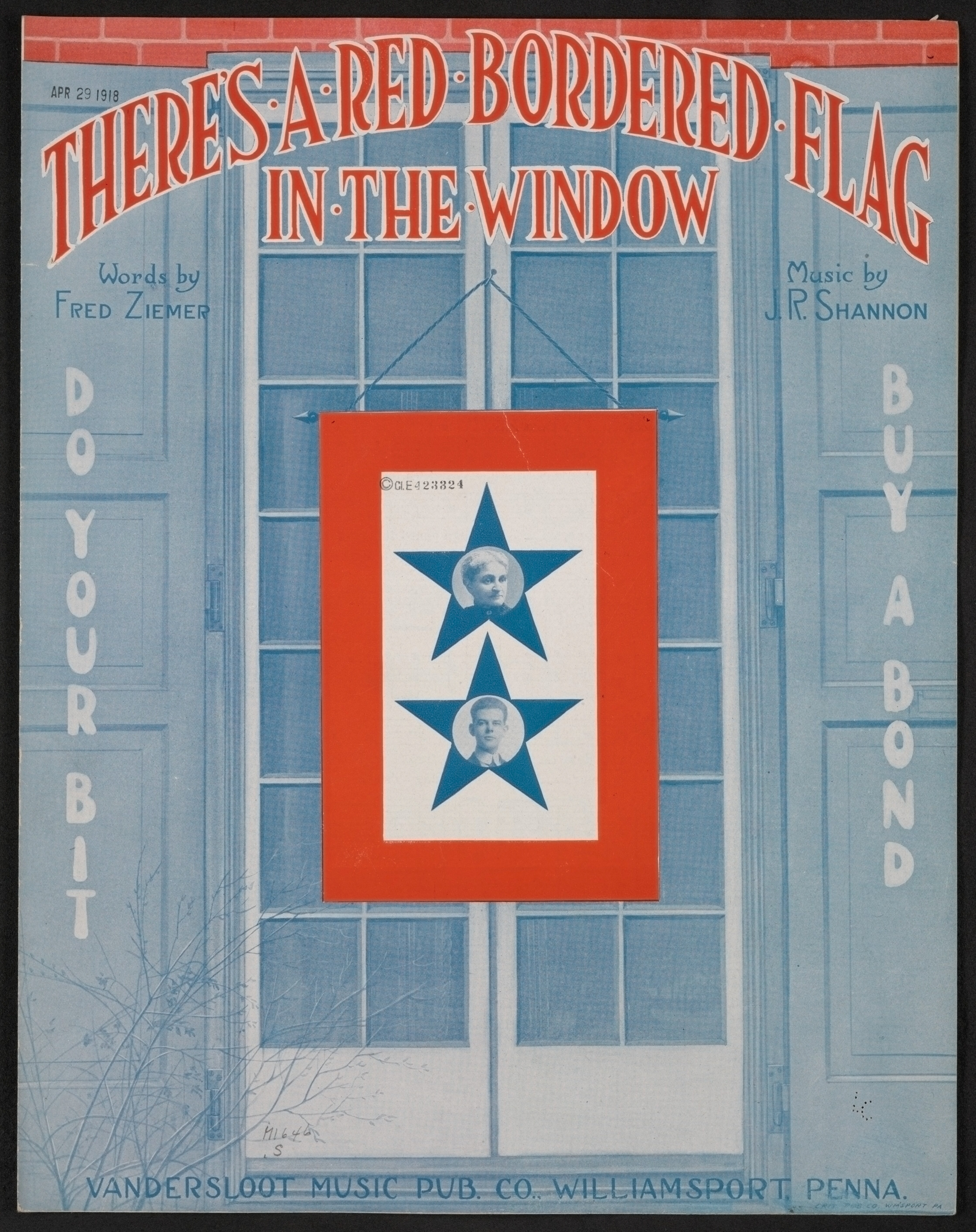

Song
- Released: 1918
- Label: Vandersloot Music Publishing Company
- Composer(s): James Royce Shannon
- Lyricist(s): Fred Ziemer

There's a Red-Bordered Flag in the Window is a World War I era song released in 1918. Fred Ziemer wrote the lyrics. J.R. Shannon composed the music. The song was published by Vandersloot Music Publishing Company of Williamsport, Pennsylvania. On the cover, there is a red-bordered service flag with two blue stars. It hangs in front of a window. On each of the two stars is a picture of a mother and her son. The piece was written for both voice and piano. The song is directed at a mother of a soldier. It begins with, "Why are you sad little mother? Why do your eyes fill with tears?" Later the narrator encourages the mother to keep hope. The flag is seen as a symbol of pride and love, as evidenced by the chorus:

"There's a red bordered flag in our window"
"Hung with tear and a prayer"
"Telling of love and devotion"
"For the boy who is now over there"
"He is fighting for our Uncle Sammy"
"He is safeguarding you and me"
"Tis the emblem of a mother's love"
"For the Land of Liberty"
