= Trial Marriage =

1929 American drama film directed by Erle C. Kenton

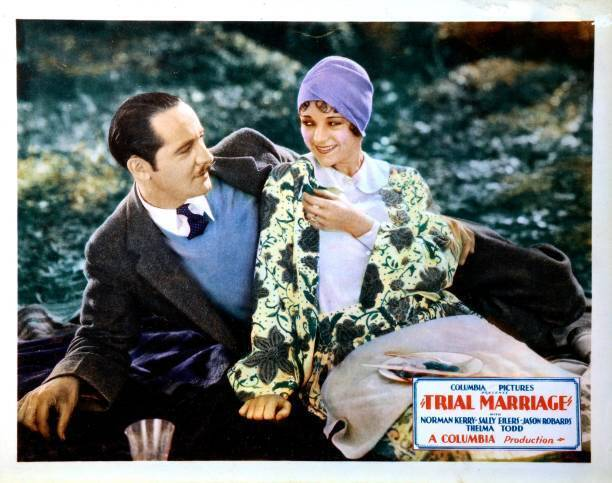
- Directed by: Erle C. Kenton
- Written by: Sonya Levien
- Produced by: Harry Cohn
- Starring: Norman Kerry; Sally Eilers
- Cinematography: Joseph Walker
- Edited by: Pandro S. Berman; William Hamilton
- Production company: Columbia Pictures Corporation
- Release date: March 10, 1929
- Running time: 7 reels
- Country: United States
- Languages: Sound (Synchronized); English intertitles

Trial Marriage is a 1929 American Synchronized sound pre-Code drama film directed by Erle C. Kenton from a story by Sonya Levien. While the film has no audible dialog, it was released with a synchronized musical score with sound effects using both the sound-on-disc and sound-on-film process. Produced by Harry Cohn for Columbia Pictures Corporation, the film was released on March 10, 1929. Charles C. Coleman was assistant director. As was the case for the majority of films during the early sound era, a silent version was prepared for theatres who had not yet converted to sound.

== Plot ==
Wealthy, oft-married George Bannister has two daughters from different wives — the lively, flirtatious Constance Bannister, daughter of his first wife, Mrs. George Bannister, and the beautiful but calculating Grace Bannister, daughter of his fourth wife.

Grace, used to winning men easily, is stung when a young admirer prefers the sparkling Constance. Matters escalate when Constance becomes engaged to Oliver Mowbray, a polished man about town. Neither takes the engagement very seriously, and Grace takes little comfort, especially after the arrival of Dr. Thorvald Ware, an aloof, handsome young physician hailed as the “catch of the season.”

Grace’s attempts to charm Thor meet with polite disinterest. His comment that the woman he loves must have “something more than a pair of pretty legs” makes her determined to conquer him. She invites him to a party announcing Constance and Oliver’s engagement, warning her sister not to “vamp” him. But when Thor pointedly refrains from the customary reception kiss, Constance’s curiosity is piqued.

During the party, Thor is called away to save the gardener’s child from choking on a coin. Constance goes along, watching him work with calm skill and realizing he is unlike any man she has known. Grace accuses Constance of trying to steal Thor as she once stole Oliver, but Constance airily replies that Grace may have Oliver back — she is already enjoying the challenge of awakening the reserved doctor’s interest.

At a moonlit midnight bathing party at a fashionable Long Island club, Constance fails to draw Thor out. Bored, she slips away to drive home, only for Thor to join her in the car. In a secluded spot, the austere physician becomes a passionate lover, confessing his feelings and proposing marriage. Constance, knowing her own fickle nature, suggests a six-month trial marriage instead. Thor agrees, and they are wed.

Grace is furious when she hears, refusing Oliver’s renewed attentions. Six happy months pass for Constance and Thor, though his long absences begin to chafe. Constance discovers she is pregnant but keeps it secret until the “trial” is over.

At the end of the contract, Oliver organizes a lavish charity bazaar to benefit a hospital. He asks Constance and Prudence to perform a daring specialty dance. Thor forbids it, and professionals are substituted — but the act flops. Grace, seizing the chance to undermine her sister, persuades Constance to go on after all. She then brings Thor to see her in revealing costume, and the enraged doctor storms home. Constance follows, but Thor insists on separation, believing the marriage childless.

A year later in France, Constance, now a mother, travels with her mother. Oliver has followed, still in love. When Constance reads in a New York paper that Thor is to marry Grace, she resolves he will never know the child is his. She agrees to marry Oliver if he will let the boy be known as his own.

Back on Long Island, Thor nearly runs over the child while returning from a call. He befriends the boy, unaware of the truth, and soon realizes his own marriage to Grace is a mistake. Eventually, he and Constance meet again at a dinner with Grace and Oliver, masking their emotions in brittle politeness.

Thor and the boy continue to meet in secret until the child falls into a pool. Thor rescues him with Constance’s help in a scene echoing their first meeting. In the urgency of saving the child, Constance blurts out the truth of his parentage — just as the boy revives.

Grace, bored with life as a physician’s wife, flirts openly with Oliver, who jokingly writes her a prescription for “a trip to Paris; a divorce; good times; no tragedies.” Taking it to Thor, she declares Oliver will accompany her. Thor, recognizing the inevitable, agrees.

With Grace gone, Thor and Constance reconcile, and this time, when Thor proposes, Constance accepts — on the condition there will be no more trial marriages. Thor enthusiastically agrees.

== Cast ==
- Norman Kerry as Oliver Mowbray
- Sally Eilers as Constance Bannister
- Jason Robards as Dr. Thorvald Ware
- Thelma Todd as Grace
- Charles Clary as George Bannister
- Naomi Childers as Mrs. George Bannister, 1st wife
- Rosemary Theby as Mrs. George Bannister, 4th wife
- Gertrude Short as Prudence
- Billy Layman (uncredited)
- Kane Richmond Party Guest (uncredited)
- Ronald R. Rondell Party Guest (uncredited)

== Music ==
The film featured a theme song entitled "I'll Never Forget" by Gus Kahn and Spike Hamilton. The song is sung by Frank Munn on the soundtrack. The song entitled "Dear Little Boy of Mine," composed by Ernest Ball and J. Keirn Brennan, was also featured on the soundtrack.

== Production ==
The June 29, 1928 issue of The Film Daily announced that Millard Webb was originally selected to direct, however he was ultimately not involved in the final film.

== Reception ==
A negative review from Variety on April 17, 1929 wrote: "An uninteresting story given a trite, long-winded, complicated treatment, with no redeeming features in the picturization."

Trial Marriage was the first film shown when the State Theater in Lexington, Kentucky, opened on April 20, 1929.

== See also ==
- List of early sound feature films (1926–1929)
