= Heaven's Artillery: March Two Step =

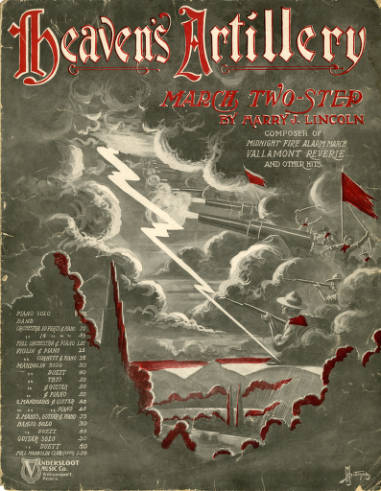

Song
- Published: 1904
- Songwriter(s): Harry J. Lincoln

Heaven's Artillery: March Two Step is a war song composed by Harry J. Lincoln. The song was produced by Vandersloot Music Publishing Company in 1904.

The sheet music can be found at the Pritzker Military Museum & Library.

== Copyrights ==
Heaven's Artillery: March Two Step was entered into the Canadian Patent Office Records on May 19, 1904.
