= General Pershing: One Step =

"General Pershing: (one – step, march or two – step)"
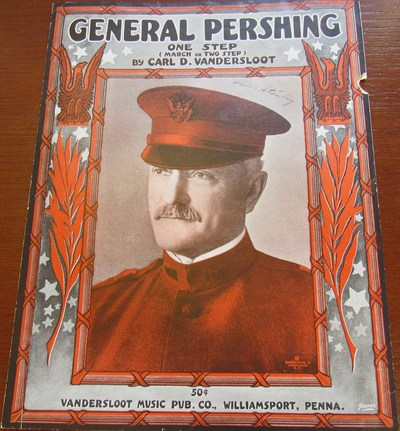

Song
- Published: 1918
- Songwriter(s): Carl D. Vandersloot

General Pershing: (one – step, march or two – step) is a march composed in 1918 by Carl D. Vandersloot and published by Vandersloot Music Publishing Company.

The song honors John J. Pershing, who led the American Expeditionary Forces to victory over Germany in World War I, 1917–18.
