= Dear Little Boy of Mine =

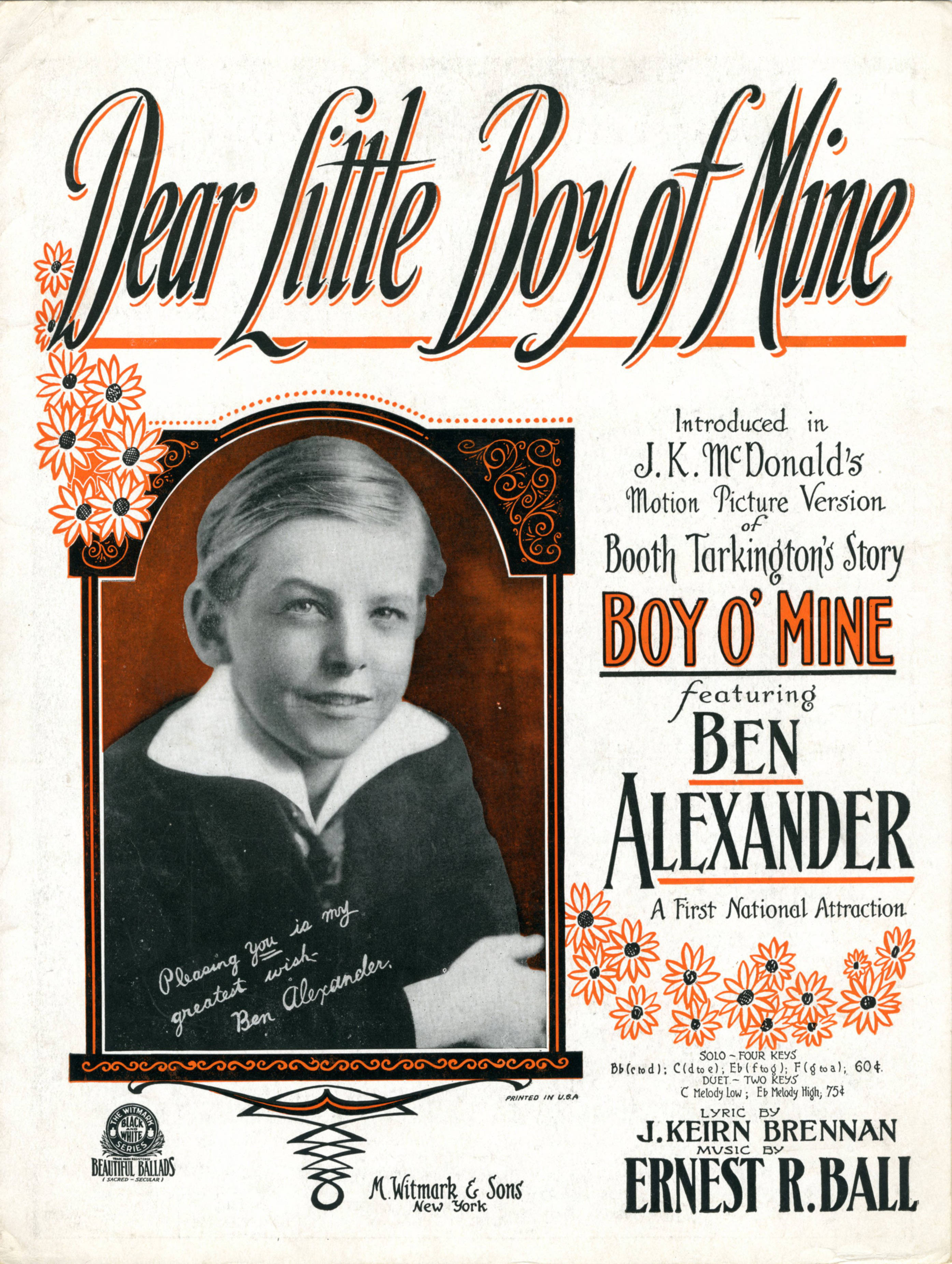
- Sheet music cover, 1923

Song by Ernest Ball
- Released: 1918
- Genre: Ballad
- Label: Columbia
- Composer: Ernest R. Ball
- Lyricist: J. Keirn Brennan

Dear Little Boy of Mine is a World War I song published in 1918. Ernest R. Ball composed the music, and J. Keirn Brennan wrote the lyrics. Vocalist Charles Harrison performed the song. The piece was written for both voice and piano. M. Witmark & Sons was the original publisher of the song.

In December 1918, the Charles Harrison version reached the number six spot on the US song charts. Another version by Will Oakland was popular in 1919.

== Analysis ==
The song is written in first person from the point of view of a parent, who longs for her son. The narrator recounts moments of her son's childhood that she thinks of, often when she is lonely. It is not made clear whether the son has simply grown up and left home, gone to war, or has died. The lyrics can be interpreted various ways. Below is a sample of the lyrics:

Boy of mine, boy of mine
Altho' my heart was aching,
I seemed to know you wanted to go,
Pride in your manhood waking.
I'll be here, waiting, dear
Till at a glad dawn's breaking,
I'll hear you say you're home to stay,
Dear little boy of mine.

== Other notable recordings ==
- 1941 Bing Crosby - recorded July 5, 1941 for Decca Records with John Scott Trotter and His Orchestra.
- 1950 Frank Sinatra - recorded June 28, 1950 for Columbia Records with the Mitch Miller Singers.

== Film appearance ==
- 1929 Trial Marriage - a sound film with a synchronized musical score and sound effects but no audible dialog includes the song
- 1944 Irish Eyes Are Smiling - the film chronicles the life of the song's composer Ernest R. Ball. In the film, the song is performed by Dick Haymes (playing Ernest R. Ball). It is also performed by Blanche Thebom in the finale.
