= Winter's Bone (soundtrack) =

Soundtracks to the 2010 film

Winter's Bone (Music from the Motion Picture)

Soundtrack album by various artists
- Released: October 26, 2010
- Genre: Bluegrass; country folk
- Length: 49:11
- Label: Cinewax

Winter's Bone (Original Score)

Film score by Dickon Hinchliffe
- Released: January 4, 2011
- Recorded: 2010
- Genre: Film score
- Length: 24:23
- Label: Cinewax
- Producer: Dickon Hinchliffe

Dickon Hinchliffe chronology
Red Riding: The Year of Our Lord 1980 (2009)	Winter's Bone (2010)	Lennon Naked (2010)

Two soundtracks were released for the coming-of-age drama film Winter's Bone: an original soundtrack and an original score. The first album featured a compilation of songs heard in the film released on October 26, 2010, and the second album featured music composed by Dickon Hinchliffe released on January 4, 2011. Both albums were distributed by Cinewax and released several months after the film.

== Background ==
Hinchliffe had associated with the editor Affonso Gonçalves whom he had worked with on Forty Shades of Blue (2005) and Married Life (2007), who recommended him to director Debra Granik and screenwriter-producer Anne Rosellini as a possible composer. Hinchliffe read the script and saw the early edit of the film which he liked and discussed with Granik and Rosellini about the musical approach. During their initial conversations, Granik felt the film to have no score at all, which Hinchliffe respected as "she wasn’t trying to hide anything with music or get music to function as an artifice", but later changed her mind and wanted a "raw and stark score". He sketched some musical ideas that he developed during their conversations and composed the themes at his studio in New York City.

His first reaction to the score being the music he wrote should use instruments common to the region—violin, guitar, fiddle, banjo, mandolin. However, he did not want the music to be a pastiche of the Ozark style and from the offset he wanted the score to be played in a different way. The fiddle is applied as an electric violin which he played using harmonics and dissonant tones and distorted the amplifier. Hinchliffe manipulated the sounds of guitar to be heard as distorted ebows and feedback. He was initially resistant on using the banjo but as most of the instrumentation provided distorted music, he felt that the banjo being important and quite different from the other sounds heard, which he played using slow motifs. He did not utilize sampled or digital sounds throughout the score.

The film featured songs interpreted and performed by Marideth Sisco and her band Blackberry Winter amongst other artists, which influenced the score in a big way. He wanted the score to sit alongside the songs and the two work together "not by being overtly similar, but by being complimentary".

== Reception ==
Writing for AllMusic, Thom Jurek in his review for the film's soundtrack summarized "Winter's Bone is perfectly balanced, played, and sequenced; every one of these 15 songs helps make this a contender for soundtrack of the year."

Ed Gonzalez of Slant Magazine described the score as "sinister". Anthony Quinn of The Independent described "Dickon Hinchliffe's sinister keening music, a beautiful and eerie evocation of otherness." Sukhdev Sandhu and Marc Lee of The Daily Telegraph summarized that Hinchliffe "contributes a wonderful, keening score". A review from Santa Barbara Independent summarized "Composer Dickon Hinchliffe cooks up the perfect blend of mountain music earthiness and sonic enigma to coat the tale". Charles Ealy of The Atlanta Journal-Constitution described it as "a brilliant score by Dickon Hinchliffe, highlighting the folk songs of the region."

== Track listing ==
=== Winter's Bone (Music from the Motion Picture) ===
No.	Title	Artist(s)	Length
1.	"Missouri Waltz"	Marideth Sisco	1:56
2.	"High on a Mountain"	Sisco; Blackberry Winter	2:42
3.	"Fair and Tender Ladies"	Sisco; Winter	3:52
4.	"On a Hill Lone and Gray"	Van Colbert; Winter	2:24
5.	"Out of Sight"	White River Music Co.	3:49
6.	"Man on the Run"	Billy Ward	3:20
7.	"In the Palm of His Hand"	Dirt Road Delight	3:46
8.	"Farther Along"	Sisco; Winter	4:25
9.	"Hardscrabble Elegy"	Dickon Hinchliffe	2:50
10.	"Bred and Buttered"	John Hawkes	3:43
11.	"Missing You"	White River	3:07
12.	"Ballad of Jessup Dolly (The Wind and Rain)"	Sisco; Winter	2:51
13.	"Sleepy Desert"	Lee Ann Sours; Brandon Wooden	3:20
14.	"Farther Along (Piano)"	Sisco; Craig Klein	4:18
15.	"Angel Band"	Sisco; Hinchliffe	2:48
Total length:			49:11

Bonus tracks (digital release)
No.	Title	Artist(s)	Length
16.	"Bury Me Beneath the Willow"	Linda Stoffel; Winter	2:53
17.	"June Apple"	[Bo Brown]; Dennis Crider	1:32
18.	"Honky Tonk Days"	White River	3:55
Total length:			57:31

=== Winter's Bone (Original Score) ===
No.	Title	Length
1.	"I'll Find Him"	1:18
2.	"Hardscrabble Elegy"	3:03
3.	"The Search for Thump"	1:04
4.	"Is This Our Time"	2:15
5.	"Down the Road"	1:43
6.	"Ree's Dream"	1:18
7.	"Jessup Dolly"	1:01
8.	"Ten Year Jolt"	1:42
9.	"Uncle Teardrop"	1:38
10.	"The Trees"	2:27
11.	"The Auction"	2:47
12.	"The Lake"	4:07
Total length:		24:23
