= Bert L. Rule =

American composer (1891-1978)

Bert L. Rule (né Albert Lyman Rule; 12 August 1891 Brooklyn; – 17 August 1978 East Patchogue, New York) was an American composer, arranger, singer, and pianist of popular songs of Tin Pan Alley and the vaudeville genre. Rule composed and published his music, some of which became national hits, from 1913 to 1934. He worked in publishing houses, namely M. Witmark & Sons and performed in vaudeville theaters throughout the country roughly during the same period.

== Career highlights ==
Brennan & Rule (circa 1918–1920)

In 1918 and 1919, while under contract with M. Witmark & Sons, Rule performed vaudeville shows with lyricist J. Keirn Brennan, both signing compositions they wrote together, with Rule accompanying on piano. Their biggest nationwide hit at the time was Have a Smile for Everyone You Meet and Gates of Gladness.

O'Brien & Rule (circa 1923–1925)

In 1924, Rule performed as a singing composer, with John O'Brien, as singing comedian, in a vaudeville show at the Lyceum in Canton, Ohio. There is an article and advertisement in an October 1924 Toronto newspaper stating that Rule and O'Brien was to perform at Shea's Hippodrome in Toronto. There are also advertisements in 1924 issues of The Plain Dealer showing Rule and O'Brien performing at B. F. Keith's Palace in Cleveland. There is a 1926 article in a 1926 issue of The Times, Batavia, New York stating that Rule and O'Brien was performing at Shea's in Buffalo.

== Selected compositions ==
Various publishers

- Way Down East, Sailors Don't Care, words & music by H. Wallis & G. Feist, Bert Rule (publisher unknown) (1923) OCLC 497250665

Published by A. J. Stasny Music Co.

- Down Where the Tennessee Flows, words by Ray Sherwood, music by Bert L. Rule (1913) OCLC 165088879
- I Did It All For You, words by Ray Sherwood, music by Bert L. Rule (1914) OCLC 665047875
- I'm Goin Back to Old Nebraska, words by Ray Sherwood, music by Bert L. Rule, cover artist Edward Henry Pfeiffer (1868–1932) (1914) OCLC 48497850
- There's a Girl That's Meant for Me: in the Heart of Tennessee, words by Ray Sherwood, music by Burt L. Rule (1914) OCLC 20120844
- Why Shouldn't I Love You, words by Ray Sherwood, music by Bert L. Rule (1915) OCLC 657982062
- Sweetheart - Time, one step, by Milbury Ryder & Bert Rule (1915) OCLC 271531699 (arr. for band) OCLC 70287199

Published by Allan & Co., Melbourne

- Shadows will fade away, words by J. Keirn Brennan, music by Bert Rule (1919) OCLC 221538171 OCLC 271310994
- The Gates of Gladness (On the Road To Sunshine Land), by J. Keirn Brennan, Paul Cunningham & Bert Rule (1919) OCLC 221854815 OCLC 456301542
- Sligo (just to hear my mother sing), Irish waltz ballad, words by J. Keirn Brennan, music by Bert Rule (1920) OCLC 498929154
- That's How I Believe in You, waltz ballad, words by Al Dubin & Paul Cunningham, music by Bert Rule (1921) OCLC 220957830

Published by M. Witmark & Sons

- I want to see my Ida Hoe in Idaho, words by Alex Sullivan, music by Bert Rule (1918) OCLC 224047101
- Have a Smile for Everyone You Meet, and They Will Have a Smile for You, words by J. Keirn Brennan & Paul Cunningham, music by Bert Rule (1918) OCLC 20120419 OCLC 449992715 OCLC 726919222
- If You Don't Stop Making Eyes at Me, I'm Goin' to Make Eyes at You, words and music by J. Keirn Brennan, Paul Cunningham, & Bert Rule (1919) OCLC 20266851 OCLC 498601440
- Shadows Will Fade Away, ballad fox trot, words by J. Keirn Brennan, music by Bert Rule (1919) OCLC 43869595 OCLC 456555712
- My Sampan Man, words by J. Keirn Brennan, music by Bert Rule (1919) OCLC 499128174
- The Gates of Gladness (on the Road to Sunshine Land), by J. Keirn Brennan, Paul Cunningham & Bert Rule (1919) OCLC 10445483 OCLC 456301542 OCLC 726897966
- Ain't It Grand in New Orleans, words by J. Keirn Brennan, music by Bert Rule (1919) OCLC 499196969
- Why must we say goodbye? by Sam Ash, J. Keirn Brennan & Bert Rule (1920) OCLC 750251473
- She's the Heart of Dixieland, words by Ray Sherwood, music by Burt L. Rule (1920) OCLC 26004178
- Just a week from to-day, novelty fox trot song, words by Paul Cunningham & Al Dubin, music by Bert Rule (1920) OCLC 60586589
- On a Far Alone Isle, novelty fox trot ballad, words by J. Keirn Brennan, music by Bert Rule (1921) OCLC 265450436
- I Want To Rock-a-Bye My Mammy, Like She Used To Rock-a-Bye Me, by Al Dubin, Paul Cunningham & Bert Rule (1921) OCLC 224767777
- That's How I Believe in You, waltz ballad, words by Al Dubin & Paul Cunningham, music by Bert Rule (1921) OCLC 20410406
- Ireland Must Be a Garden, If You Are a Wild Irish Rose, fox trot song, words by George Graff, music by Bert Rule (1923) OCLC 20597781

== Selected arrangements ==
Published by Santly Bros.

- I Never Dreamt: You'd Fall in Love With Me, by Donovan Parsons & Vivian Ellis, arr. by Frank Skinner, vocal trio arrangement by Bert L. Rule (1928) OCLC 739703950
- F'r instance, fox trot, by Paul Denniker, arranged by Archie Bleyer, includes a vocal trio arr. by Bert L. Rule (1930) OCLC 41062256
- When the Organ Played at Twilight, waltz, words by Raymond Wallace, music by Jimmy Campbell & Reg Connelly, arr. by William Conrad Polla, vocal trio arr. by Bert Rule (1930) OCLC 11288402
- By my side, fox trot, words by Dorothy Dick & Bert Lown, music by Harry Link & Chauncey Gray, arranged by Frank Skinner, trio arrangement by Bert L. Rule (1931) OCLC 40576844
- My Cradle Sweetheart, waltz, lyrics by Charles Newman, music by Isham Jones, arr. by Bob Haring, includes a vocal trio arrangement by Bert L. Rule (1931) OCLC 42520069
- June Time is Love Time, For Everyone But Me, fox trot, words by Sidney Clare & Charles Tobias, music by Al Sherman, arr. by Frank Skinner, includes a vocal trio arrangement by Bert L. Rule (1931) OCLC 42634630
- Building a home for you, fox-trot, words by Gus Kahn, music by Joseph H. Santly & Joe Bennett, arr. by Fred Loring (1931) OCLC 38851842
- I'm an unemployed sweetheart, looking for somebody to love, fox trot, words by Edgar Leslie & Ned Washington, music by James V. Monaco, arranged by Art McKay, trio arrangement by Bert L. Rule (1931) OCLC 39397534

Santly Bros. WFAA Collection

- Concentratin' (on you), words by Andy Razaf, music by Thomas Waller, trio arr. by Bert L. Rule (1931) OCLC 40530948
- At the Baby Parade, novelty fox-trot, by Jack Little, Dave Oppenheim & Ira Schuster, vocal trio arr. by Bert L. Rule (1932) OCLC 40496713
- When it's Darkness on the Delta, fox-trot, vocal trio, words by Marty Symes & Al J. Neiburg, music by Jerry Levinson, arr. by Bert L. Rule (1932) OCLC 40528450
- It's the talk of the town, vocal trio, words by Marty Symes & Al J. Neiburg, music by Jerry Levinson, arr. by Bert L. Rule (1933) OCLC 40512813
- Under a Blanket of Blue, fox trot, words by Marty Symes & Al J. Neiburg, music by Jerry Levinson, vocal trio arr. by Bert L. Rule (1933) OCLC 40514411
- Out in the Cold Again, vocal trio, words by Ted Koehler, music by Rube Bloom, arr. by Bert L. Rule (1934) OCLC 40509604
- It's All Forgotten Now, vocal trio, words and music by Ray Noble, arr. by Bert L. Rule (1934) OCLC 40509575
- Spellbound, fox trot, vocal trio, words by Stanley Adams, music by Jesse Greer, arr. by Bert L. Rule (1934) OCLC 40571289

== Selected discography ==
Historic recordings

- Have a smile Sterling Trio Victor 18518 (4 December 1918)
- The gates of gladness (on the road to Sunshine Land) Shannon Four, Lewis James, Victor 18590 (28 May 1919)
- That's how I believe in you Henry Burr, Victor 18848 (27 October 1921)

Cylinder recordings

- Just a week from to-day, sung by Aileen Stanley with orchestra, 1219 – Edison Blue Amberol: 4293 (1921)

== Family ==
Albert Lyman Rule was married to Jessie Jack Ellen Laurie (1894-1978). They had a son and a daughter: Donald J. Rule (born 1915–2008) and Edna J. Rule (born 1921-1990).
