= Out of Sight (disambiguation) =

Out of Sight is a 1998 criminal comedy film directed by Steven Soderbergh, based on the Elmore Leonard novel.

Out of Sight or Outta Sight may also refer to:

== Film and television ==
- Out of Sight (1966 film), an American comedy film directed by Lennie Weinrib
- Out of Sight (TV series), a 1996–1998 British children's series
- "Out of Sight" (Charmed), a 1999 TV episode
- "Out of Sight" (Saving Hope), a 2012 TV episode

== Literature ==
- Out of Sight (novel), a 1996 novel by Elmore Leonard
- "Out of Sight", a short story by Isaac Asimov in the 1974 collection Tales of the Black Widowers

== Music ==
- Outasight (born 1983), American rapper
- Outta Sight Records, a British record label

=== Albums ===
- Out of Sight (album), by James Brown, 1964
- Outta Sight, by the Sheepdogs, 2022

=== Songs ===
- "Out of Sight" (song), by James Brown, 1964
- "Out of Sight", by the Bloody Beetroots, featuring Paul McCartney and Youth, 2013
- "Out of Sight", by Emma Muscat, a withdrawn entry to represent Malta in the Eurovision Song Contest 2022
- "Out of Sight", by Logic from Confessions of a Dangerous Mind, 2019
- "Out of Sight", by Midland from On the Rocks, 2017
- "Out of Sight", by Mike Oldfield from Guitars, 1999
- "Out of Sight", by Run the Jewels from RTJ4, 2020
- "Out of Sight", by Smash Mouth from Smash Mouth, 2001
- "Out of Sight", by White River Music Co. from the Winter's Bone film soundtrack, 2010
- "Outta Sight/Dark Lavender Interlude", by DRAM from Big Baby DRAM, 2016

== See also ==
- Out of Mind, Out of Sight (disambiguation)
- Out of Site (disambiguation)
