= Glory of Womanhood =

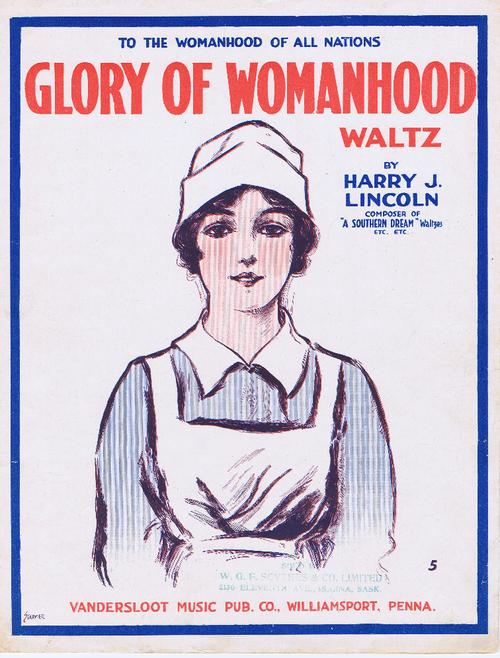
- Sheet Music cover

Song
- Language: English
- Published: 1917
- Songwriter: Harry J. Lincoln

Glory of Womanhood is a World War I song written and composed by Harry J. Lincoln. It was first published in 1917 by Vandersloot Music Publishing Company in Williamsport, PA. The cover features the drawing of a nurse and is dedicated to the womanhood of all nations.

The sheet music can be found at the Pritzker Military Museum & Library.
