= Raymond Sherwood =

American lyricist (1889-1965)

Raymond A. Sherwood (25 November 1889, in Brooklyn – 15 August 1965, in Arcadia, Florida) was an American lyricist of popular music of the Tin Pan Alley genre (circa early 1920s). Sherwood's World War I Draft Registration indicates that in June 1917, he worked as a salesman for Forster Music Publisher, Inc. Forster, based in Chicago, at that time had an office at 116 West 42nd Street in Manhattan.

== Selected compositions ==
Various publishers

- "Down Love's Old Way," words & music by Ray Sherwood, Samuel A. Massell, Brooklyn (pub.) (1915)
- "General Hooligan," words by Ray Sherwood, music by Harry Von Tilzer, Harry Von Tilzer Music Publishing Co. (1915) OCLC 497274564
- "Oh, You Little Tootsie Roll," words by Ray Sherwood, music by Raymond Walker, P. J. Howley Music Co. (Patrick J. Howley; 1870–1918) (1917) OCLC 367888433
- "Honeymoon Waltz," words by Ray Sherwood, music by Victor Arden, Triangle Music Pub. Co. (1919) OCLC 221406803
- "She's the Heart of Dixieland," words by Ray Sherwood, music by Burt L. Rule, M. Witmark & Sons (1920) OCLC 26004178
- "Repasz Band," song, founded on the Melody of the famous march of the same name, words by Ray Sherwood, music by Harry J. Lincoln, Jerry Vogel Music Co. (1920) OCLC 48429676

A. J. Stasny Music Co.

- "Down Where the Tennessee Flows," words by Ray Sherwood, music by Bert L. Rule (1913) OCLC 165088879
- "I Did It All For You," words by Ray Sherwood, music by Bert L. Rule (1914) OCLC 665047875
- "I'm Goin Back to Old Nebraska," words by Ray Sherwood, music by Bert L. Rule, cover artist Edward Henry Pfeiffer (1868–1932) (1914) OCLC 48497850
- "There's a Girl That's Meant for Me: in the Heart of Tennessee," words by Ray Sherwood, music by Bert L. Rule (1914) OCLC 20120844
- "Why Shouldn't I Love You," words by Ray Sherwood, music by Bert L. Rule (1915) OCLC 657982062
- "Mr. Ford You've Got the Right Idea," words by Ray Sherwood, music by J. Fred'k Coots (1916) OCLC 726927577
- "When I Dream Of The Girl Of My Dreams," words by Ray Sherwood, music by J. Fred'k Coots (1916)

F. B. Haviland Pub. Co. Inc. (Frederick Benjamin Haviland; 1867–1932)

- "Are we downhearted? No! No! No!," words by Ray Sherwood, music by Will Donaldson (1917) OCLC 20119277
- "There's a little Bit of Green in Everybody," words by Ray Sherwood, music by William Donaldson (1917) OCLC 498270629
- "Sunshine," words by Ray Sherwood, music by William Donaldson (1918) OCLC 498270618
- "I Haven't Mentioned Mammy," words by Ray Sherwood, music by Marion Schott (1926) OCLC 60316814

Forster Music Publisher, Inc.

- "Oh Johnny, Oh Johnny, Oh," words by Ed Rose, music by Abe Olman, patriotic lyrics by Ray Sherwood (1917) OCLC 741366211
- "Climbing the Ladder of Love," words & music by Abe Olman, Ray Walker & Ray Sherwood (1917) OCLC 64202233

Vandersloot Music Publishing Company

- "General Pershing," words by James Royce Shannon & Ray Sherwood, music by Carl D. Vandersloot (1918) OCLC 82075492
- "Forget Me Not My American Rose," words & music by Ray Sherwood (1918) OCLC 51588214
- "When I dream About That Southern Home of Mine," words & music by Ray Sherwood (1918) OCLC 499182236
- "Sliding Sid," a vocal spasm, words by Ray Sherwood, music by Abe Losch (pseudonym for Harry James Lincoln) (1919) OCLC 62285771
- "The Great American (Theodore Roosevelt)," words by Ray Sherwood, music by Harry J. Lincoln (1919) OCLC 80124575
- "Shadows," song, founded on the melodies of the Shadows Waltz,” words by Ray Sherwood, music by Howard Lutter (1919) OCLC 499086080
- "Let Me Dream," words by Ray Sherwood, music by Curtis Gordon (1919) OCLC 367852359
- "At the Wedding of the Lily and the Rose," words & music by Ray Sherwood (1919) OCLC 499144622
- "In Shadowland," words by J. Stanley Brothers, Jr., & Ray Sherwood, music by J.S. Brothers, Jr. (1919)
- "Hold Me In Your Heart," waltz song, words by Ray Sherwood, music by Charley Straight (1920) OCLC 497571374
- "Midnight," song, words by Ray Sherwood, music by Frank Banta & Carl D. Vandersloot (1920) OCLC 26007123
- "Hawaiian Twilight," words by Ray Sherwood, music by Carl D. Vandersloot (1920) OCLC 137341577
- "Some Little Girl," song - fox trot, words by Ray Sherwood, music by Carl D. Vandersloot, arranged by Frank E. Barry (1929) OCLC 40141074
- "The American Legion," words by Ray Sherwood, music by Carl D. Vandersloot (1920) OCLC 498856189
- "Spanish Moon," words & music by Ray Sherwood (1920)
- "The Waltz of Love," words by Ray Sherwood, music by Milo Rega (pseudonym for Fred Hager, musical director for Okeh Records) (1921) OCLC 38046230
- "Somewhere in Honolulu," words by Raymond Sherwood, music by Carl D. Vandersloot and Harry J. Lincoln (1921)
- "In Tennessee," words by Ray Sherwood, music by Carl D. Vandersloot (1921) OCLC 728285365
- "Dream Kiss," words by Ray Sherwood, music by Alfred J. Rienzo (1921) OCLC 221472054
- "Dreamy Hawaii," words by Raymond Sherwood, music by F. W. Vandersloot (1921) OCLC 19664227
- "Building Love Castles," words & music by Raymond Sherwood (1922) OCLC 51288841
- "Hawaiian Slumbertime," words by Ray Sherwood, music by Carl D. Vandersloot (1922)
- "Sunset Valley," words by Raymond Sherwood, music by John W. Meyer (1922)
- "My Old Hawaiian Home," words by Raymond Sherwood, music by F. W. Vandersloot (1922) OCLC 10367477
- "Lonesome Lips," a fox trot serenade, words by Ray Sherwood, music by Margie Kelly (1922) OCLC 39676374
- "Happy," words by Ray Sherwood, music by Margie Kelly (1923)
- "Hawaiian Love Nest Song," words by Raymond Sherwood, music by F. W. Vandersloot (1924)
- "Hawaiian Sunset," words by Ray Sherwood, music by Carl D. Vandersloot (1925)
- "Dreamy Havana Moon Song," with Ukulele Arrangement, words by Ray Sherwood, music by F. W. Vandersloot (1926) OCLC 77964640

== Family ==
Raymond Sherwood was the son of John A. Sherwood (b. Aug 1844, Ireland; d. 11 June 1915 Brooklyn) and Margaret McHale (b. Nov 1847 Ireland; d. 22 Apr 1916 Carbondale, Pennsylvania), who married in 1863. He was the youngest of 10 children.

He married Mary Josephine Sherwood (née Margaret Josephine Hines; b. 12 May 1901 Brooklyn; d. 6 Aug 1991). Raymond Sherwood died at G. Pierce Wood Memorial Hospital in Arcadia, Florida, on August 15, 1965. At the time of his death, he resided in Wauchula, Florida.
