= Outta Time =

Outta Time may refer to:

- "Outta Time" (Bryson Tiller song), 2020
- "Outta Time" (Natalia Kills song), 2013
- "Outta Time", a 2014 song by Future from the album Future
- Outta Time, a 2002 film featuring George Lopez

== See also ==
- Out of Time (disambiguation)
