= When Irish Eyes Are Smiling =

Song
- Published: 1912
- Songwriters: Lyricists: Chauncey Olcott, George Graff, Jr. Composer: Ernest Ball

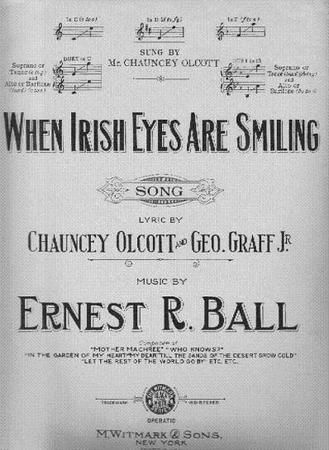
Sheet music cover

"When Irish Eyes Are Smiling" is a lighthearted song in tribute to Ireland. Its lyrics were written by Chauncey Olcott and George Graff, Jr., set to music composed by Ernest Ball, for Olcott's production of The Isle O' Dreams, and Olcott sang the song in the show. It was first published in 1912, at a time when songs in tribute to a romanticised Ireland were very numerous and popular both in Britain and the United States. During the First World War the famous tenor John McCormack recorded the song.

The song continued to be a familiar standard for generations. Decades later it was used as the opening song on the American radio show Duffy's Tavern. The song has been recorded on over 200 singles and albums and by many famous singers, including Bing Crosby, Connie Francis, and Roger Whittaker.

== Lyrics ==
Verse 1:

There's a tear in your eye and I'm wondering why,
For it never should be there at all;
With such pow'r in your smile, sure a stone you'd beguile,
So there's never a tear-drop should fall;
When your sweet lilting laughter's like some fairy song,
And your eyes twinkle bright as can be;
You should laugh all the while and all other times, smile,
And now smile a smile for me.

Chorus:

When Irish eyes are smiling,
Sure it's like a morn in Spring,
In the lilt of Irish laughter
You can hear the angels sing.
When Irish hearts are happy,
All the world seems bright and gay,
And when Irish eyes are smiling,
Sure, they steal your heart away.

Verse 2:

For your smile is a part of the love in your heart,
And it makes even sunshine more bright;
Like the linnet's sweet song, crooning all the day long,
Comes your laughter so tender and light;
For the spring-time of life is the sweetest of all,
There is ne'er a real care or regret;
And while spring-time is ours throughout all of youth's hours,
Let us smile each chance we get.

(Chorus)

== The song in the news ==
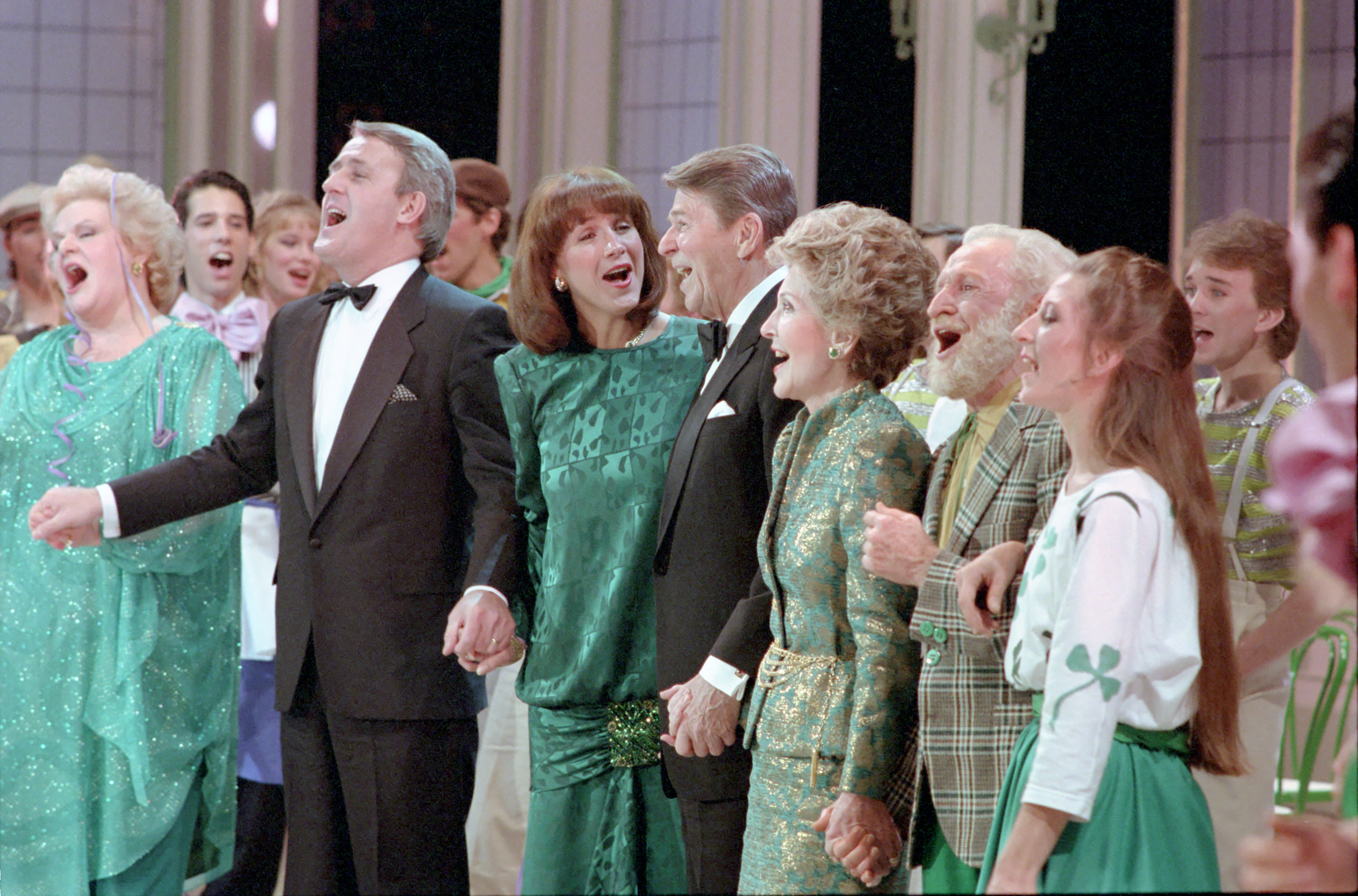
The Mulroneys and Reagans singing "When Irish Eyes Are Smiling" at the Grand Théâtre de Québec in Quebec City, Canada, March 18, 1985.

The song gained notoriety in Canada after the so-called Shamrock Summit between Canadian Prime Minister Brian Mulroney and U.S. President Ronald Reagan held on Saint Patrick's Day, 1985. At the end of the evening, the two leaders and their wives jointly sang "When Irish Eyes Are Smiling", intended to celebrate both leaders' Irish heritage. Mulroney was extensively criticized in the Canadian press for a "cloying performance" said to symbolize his government's excessive closeness to Reagan's.

== In film ==
"When Irish Eyes are Smiling" has been used in the following movies and short subjects, plus numerous quotes in classic Warner Bros. Cartoons:

- "Titanic: Honor and Glory Demo trailer", 2017
- "Older Than Ireland", 2015
- "Return to Me", 2000
- "It's A Great Day For The Irish", 1999
- "The Young Indiana Jones Chronicles (Ireland, April 1916)", 1993
- "Young Guns", 1988 (Anachronistically, as the movie is set in 1877, 35 years before the song was published.)
- "Husbands", 1970
- "Ducking the Devil", 1957 cartoon
- "Canary Row", 1950
- "Top o' the Morning", 1949 (sung by Bing Crosby).
- "The Time of Your Life", 1948
- "My Wild Irish Rose", 1947
- "Trap Happy Porky", 1945
- "Irish Eyes Are Smiling", 1944 (This is an actual movie about Ernest R. Ball)
- "My Favorite Blonde", 1942
- "Notes to You", 1941
- "Aviation Vacation", 1941
- "Always a Bride", 1940
- "The Long Voyage Home", 1940
- "Tear Gas Squad", 1940
- "It All Came True", 1940
- "The Fighting 69th", 1940
- "Let Freedom Ring", 1939
- "The Crowd Roars", 1938
- "North of the Rio Grande", 1937
- "Roof Tops of Manhattan", 1935
- "The Irish in Us", 1935
- "In Caliente", 1935
- "Ireland: 'The Emerald Isle", 1934
- "Stage Mother", 1933

== Copyright dispute ==
Fred Fisher Music Co. v. M. Witmark & Sons concerned the copyright of this song (which is now in public domain.)
