= Harry J. Lincoln =

American composer (1878–1937)

The Fire Master (1914)
Lincoln's 1914 march The Fire Master, played by the U.S. Air Force Band

Harry James Lincoln, also known as Harry Jay Lincoln (April 13, 1878 – April 19, 1937), was a music composer from Williamsport, Pennsylvania. He was born in Shamokin, Pennsylvania.

== Career ==
Aside from running his own publication company, he wrote many marches and rags, such as the Bees Wax Rag (1911), the Lincoln Highway two step march (1921), and quite possibly the Repasz Band March (1901). This last composition, created for the local Repasz Band of Williamsport, Pennsylvania (founded in 1831 and currently the oldest brass band still in existence in the United States), has also been credited to its trombonist Charles C. Sweeley; however, evidence indicates that Sweeley had bought rights to the march from Lincoln. Lincoln also arranged the works of other composers, such as Irene Marschand Ritter.

=== Pseudonyms ===
Lincoln often used several pseudonyms, a common practice for composers who published in their own firm. His pseudonyms included:

1. Thomas Casele
2. Ben E. Crosby
3. James L. Dempsey
4. I. Furman-Mulliner
5. James L. Harlin
6. Frederick M. Holmes
7. Harry Jay
8. Joseph Kiefer
9. Abe Losch ("Losch" was the maiden name of his mother)
10. Carl Loveland
11. Carl L. Loveland
12. Gay A. Rimert
13. Lillian H. Sarver
14. Chas. C. Sweeley
15. Caird M. Vandersloot
16. Carl D. Vandersloot
17. F. W. Vandersloot
18. Jesse Westover
19. Frederick Williams

=== Death ===
Lincoln died on April 19, 1937, at the age of 59.

== Selected compositions ==
- "A Jolly Sailor"
- "Alameda Waltzes" (1908)
- "American Emblem" (1923)
- "Bang Up Two Step" (1913)
- "Bees Wax Rag" (1911) (Audio recording)
- "Belle of the Season" (1924)
- "Blaze of Honour" (1915)
- "Buffalo Flyer"
- "Canonade" (1928)
- "Circus Life" (1914)
- "Dance Of The Fairies" (1912)
- "Dixie A Rag Caprice" (1911)
- "Dreaming at Twilight" (1915)
- "Dreamy Swanee Lullaby" (1917)
  (a collaboration of Lincoln and George C. Pennington)
- "Emblem of Peace" (1923)
- "Empire Express"
- "Excuse Me But Isn't Your Name Johnson?" (1907)
- "Ferns and Flowers"
- "Flowers of the Forest"
- "Garden of Lilies" (1913)
- "Girls of America" (1923)
- Glory of Womanhood (1917)
- Heaven's Artillery: March Two Step (1904)
- "Midnight Fire Alarm" (1900)
- "Midnight Special"
- "Palm Limited
- "Sunset Limited" (1910)
- "Halley's Comet Rag" (1910)
- "The Iron Division" (1919)

== Family ==
Lincoln married Lottie May Bovee (maiden) June 14, 1898, in Elmira, New York. They had two children:

1. Margaret Emily Lincoln Walther (born to their marriage; 1904–1933), and
2. Harry Jay Lincoln Jr. (adopted; 1929–1952)

== See also ==
- Vandersloot Music Publishing Company
