= Too Ra Loo Ra Loo Ral =

Irish-American song

The original sheet music

"Too-Ra-Loo-Ra-Loo-Ral (That's an Irish Lullaby)" is a classic American song that was written in 1913 by composer James Royce Shannon (1881–1946) for the Tin Pan Alley musical Shameen Dhu. The original recording of the song, by Chauncey Olcott, peaked at #1 on the music charts. The song was brought back to prominence by Bing Crosby's performance in 1944's Going My Way. Crosby's single sold over a million copies and peaked at #4 on the Billboard music charts.

== History ==
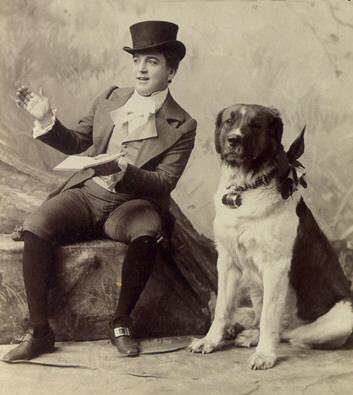
Released in 1913, the song was a #1 hit for Chauncey Olcott.

The song's eponymous hook ("toora-loora-loo") is attested to at least as far back as 1837 in humorist doggerel in The New Monthly Magazine and elsewhere during the 19th century. It likely has roots in the same nonsense word "turelurelu" as that used to indicate the sound of a flute in the French-language Christmas song "Patapan" recorded in 1720.

The 1913 song was written by lyricist and actor Shannon for the play Shameen Dhu ("Black-Haired Jimmy" or "Dark Jimmy"). Prior to the play's debut, singer Chauncey Olcott took it into the studio to record it on July 30, 1913. Popular, his single peaked at #1 on the music charts in December 1913.

In 1944, Bing Crosby released a version of the song which brought it to public attention again. First performed in the film Going My Way, it was subsequently released as a single that sold over a million copies and peaked at #4 on Billboard music charts. His first recording was made on July 7, 1944, but mechanical difficulties with the matrix led to it being recorded again on July 17, 1945. It is this version which appears on subsequent LPs and CDs. In 1945, the Crosby version of the song was also featured in the film Nob Hill. In 2019 it featured in Ray Donovan, season 7, episode 5; "An Irish Lullaby".

== Other versions ==
In 1976, Richard Manuel and Van Morrison sang the song, as "Tura Lura Lural (That's an Irish Lullaby)", during The Band's farewell concert The Last Waltz. "Come On, Eileen", a #1 U.K. chart single from the English band Dexys Midnight Runners, includes a chorus with the lines "Too-Ra-Loo-Ra Too-Ra-Loo-Rye, Ay / And you'll hum this tune forever." The song appeared on their 1982 album titled Too-Rye-Ay. The same line is also repeated in the song "Vagabond of the Western World" by Irish rock band Thin Lizzy from their 1973 album Vagabonds of the Western World. Steve Martin performed the song for comic effect in the film Housesitter. The song also featured memorably in a Season 2, Episode 8 cold open of Cheers, as the denizens of the bar sang the lullaby over the telephone to an infant Tortelli. Ed Asner's character, Lou Grant, also sang the lullaby to Mary Richards on her couch to help her get to sleep without using a sleeping pill in an episode of the final season of The Mary Tyler Moore Show. Damian McGinty's character performs the song in the film Santa Fake to comfort the widow Mrs. Ortega.

Others who have recorded the song include Bobby Darin, Connie Francis, Perry Como, The Ames Brothers, Regis Philbin, Jessi Colter, Slim Whitman, Jerry Lewis and Dean Martin, The Irish Tenors, Rosemary Clooney, Kate Smith, Gene Autry, Frances Faye, John Gary, Kenny Loggins, and The Ennis Sisters.

== Original lyrics ==
These are the original lyrics of the song as published in 1913 by Shannon through M. Witmark & Sons.

[Verse 1]
Over in Killarney, many years ago
Me Mother sang a song to me in tones so sweet and low,
Just a simple little ditty, in her good ould Irish way,
And I'd give the world if she could sing
That song to me this day.

[Refrain]
Too-ra-loo-ra-loo-ral,
Too-ra-loo-ra-li,
Too-ra-loo-ra-loo-ral,
Hush, now, don't you cry!
Too-ra-loo-ra-loo-ral,
Too-ra-loo-ra-li,
Too-ra-loo-ra-loo-ral,
That's an Irish lullaby.

[Verse 2]
Oft, in dreams I wander To that cot again,
I feel her arms a huggin' me As when she held me then.
And I hear her voice a hummin' To me as in days of yore,
When she used to rock me fast asleep Outside the cabin door.

[Repeat refrain]
