= Frank H. Losey =

American musician, composer and arranger (1870-1931)

"Gloria March"
Performed by the United States Air Force Band of the Rockies

"Killarney"
Losey's 1912 waltz, "Killarney"

Frank Hoyt Losey (March 18, 1870 – 3 May 1931) was an American musician, composer, and arranger of band and orchestra music. He is credited with over 400 compositions and 2,500 arrangements including his most recognized composition, "Gloria March".

Losey was born in Rochester, New Jersey and raised in Lawrenceeville. While it has been commonly cited that he was born in 1872 or 1875, his presence as an infant in the 1870 Census shows these references to be incorrect, as well as his correct age of 61 on his death certificate. Frank studied music at an early age, learning to play cornet, violin, and piano. Losey was a cornetist for local and regional bands until he suffered from lip paralysis which forced him to switch to trombone and euphonium and limited him to smaller theater performances.

Starting in 1902, Losey composed and arranged music for Carl Fischer and became editor-in-chief of the Vandersloot Music Publishing Company. In 1919, Thomas Edison selected Losey to be the music adviser for Edison's phonograph company. He was also approached by Henry Ford to arrange music for the Ford Orchestra in Detroit. Losey died in Erie, Pennsylvania in 1931.

The Historic American Sheet Music Project contains nine examples of his work:

- Call of the wild march and two-step (1904);
- Parade of the humming birds (1906);
- Heather bells mazurka (1906);
- The Seventy-Fourth Regiment Band March (1906);
- March of the Nile (1907);
- Loyal knights march (1907);
- Dance of the nightingales; Barn dance (1908);
- The Magic Mirror (1910); and,
- Tangle-foot rag (1910).
