= Irene Marschand Ritter =

Irene Marschand Ritter (active 1913-1960) was a composer, music teacher and organist. Her works for piano and voice number through opus 45. Although her birth and death dates are unknown, she published music and renewed copyrights between 1913 and 1960.

Ritter was born in Philadelphia, Pennsylvania. Her mother, a piano teacher, was Ritter’s first teacher. She also studied with Ida Cosden de Socio and with Dr. Duerner in Denver, Colorado.

In February 1920, The Etude magazine published a short article about Ritter and included the music for her composition Sparkling Fountain in the issue. Her composition Strutting Out was arranged for violin and piano or wind band by William H. Mackie and included in Theodore Presser’s Progressive Music for Orchestra.

Her composition Garden of Roses was widely arranged:

by Edgar Alden Barrell, Jr. with added lyrics for treble duet or two-part chorus

by William M. Felton for violin, cello, and piano and for school chorus

by Harry J. Lincoln for violin and piano or wind band (also included in Progressive Music for Orchestra)

by Rob Roy Peery for violin and piano.

Ritter’s composition Keep Your Chin up in True Yankee Style was published in 1942 by Marschand Music Company. All of Ritter’s other works were published by Theodore Presser. Several works were copyrighted but unpublished. Ritter’s compositions included:

== Piano ==
Air de Ballet

Among the Flowers

Beneath a Weeping Willow

Dance of the Imps, opus 45

Dancing Nymphs

Evening Shadows

Garden of Roses (also arranged for four hand piano)

Let’s Have a Picnic on Sunday (unpublished but copyrighted)

Lonesome and Blue (unpublished but copyrighted)

Meditation

Pnesee d’Amour

Pond Lilies

Reminiscence

Sparkling Fountain

Squadrons of the Air (march; also arranged for four hand piano)

Strutting Out

Summer Breezes

Withered Roses

== Vocal ==
“Keep Your Chin Up in True Yankee Style” (text by Ray Taulbot)

“Someone” (text by Raphael Fleming McGuire; unpublished but copyrighted)

“Sweetheart of the Year” (text by Louise Ayres and Clyde Esnard Malle; unpublished but copyrighted)

“Texas Tommy Tex” (text by Eddie Malle and Louise Ayres)

“That’s Why All God’s Chillun is Born” (text by Louise Ayres; unpublished but copyrighted)

“Troubles, Troubles, and You Think You Got Troubles” (text by Louise Ayres; unpublished but copyrighted)
