= Time Is Running Out =

Time Is Running Out may refer to:

== Music ==
- Time Is Running Out (album), by Brass Fever, 1976
- "Time Is Running Out" (Muse song), 2003
- "Time Is Running Out" (Papa Roach song), 2007
- "Time Is Running Out", a song by Steve Winwood from Steve Winwood, 1977

== Other media ==
- Time Is Running Out (film), a 1970 West German documentary
- Incubation: Time Is Running Out, a 1997 turn-based tactics computer game

== See also ==
- Running Out of Time (disambiguation)
