= J. Keirn Brennan =

American songwriter (1873–1948)

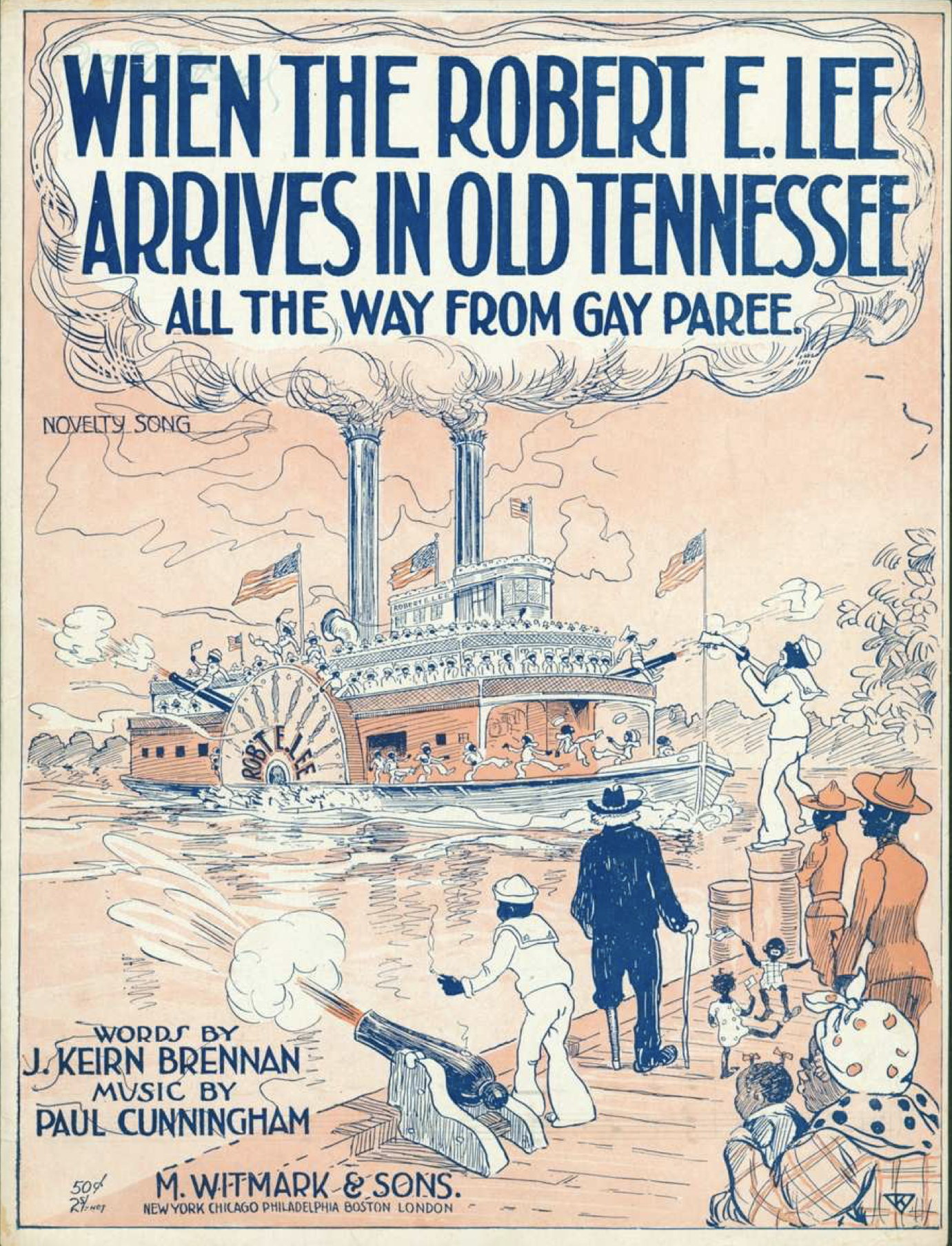
Front cover to 1929 sheet music for "When the Robert E. Lee Arrives in Old Tennessee (All the Way from Gay Paree)" which Brennan wrote with Paul Cunningham.

J. Keirn Brennan (November 24, 1873 – February 4, 1948) was an American lyricist. He joined ASCAP as a charter member in 1914 and collaborated with many notable songwriters. He is probably best known for co-writing the 1929 film The Show of Shows.

Born in San Francisco, California, his musical collaborators included Harry Akst, Ernest Ball, Walter Donaldson, Rudolf Friml, Karl Hajos, Billy Hill, Werner Janssen, Chauncey Olcott, and Maurice Rubens. His song compositions include Sure a Little Bit of Heaven (1914), Dear Little Boy of Mine, Goodbye, Good Luck, God Bless You, Empty Saddles, Turn Back the Universe, When My Boy Comes Home, A Little Bit of Love, My Bird of Paradise, I'll Follow the Trail, You Hold My Heart, Let the Rest of the World Go By and Ireland Is Ireland to Me.

He died in Hollywood, California.

== Other songs ==
- "America Never Took Water and America Never Will" - 1919
- "For Dixie and Uncle Sam" - 1916. m: Ernest R. Ball
- "Goodbye, Mother Machree" - 1918. m: Ernest R. Ball
- "I Wish That He Was Back in Tipperary" - 1915. m: Ernest R. Ball
- "I'm from Ohio" - 1918. m: Ernest R. Ball
- "Never Let Yourself Forget You Are Irish Too" - 1915. m: Ernest R. Ball
- "When the Robert E. Lee Arrives in Old Tennessee All the Way from Gay Paree" - 1918. m: Paul Cunningham
- "You Can't Beat Us for We've Never Lost a War" - 1918. m: Ernest R. Ball
- "You Can't Beat Us If It Takes Ten Million More" - 1918. m: Ernest R. Ball
- "You'll Be There" - 1915. m: Ernest R. Ball

== See also ==
- Bert L. Rule, composer who performed with Brennan in 1918
