= Out of Site =

Out of Site may refer to:

- Out of Site, a 1966 film starring Robert Pine
- "Out of Site", a song by Built to Spill from their 1997 album Perfect from Now On

== See also ==
- Out of Sight (disambiguation)
