= A. J. Stasny Music Co. =

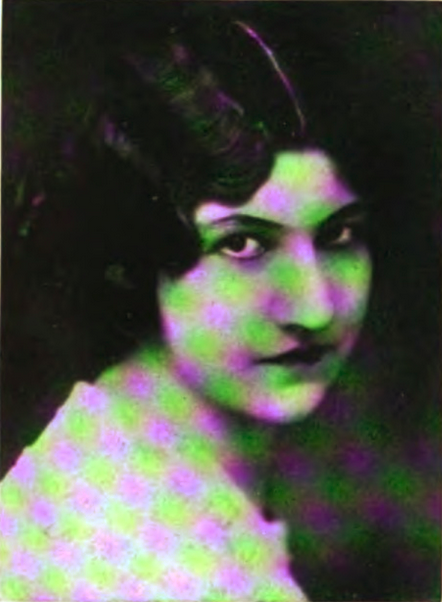
Betty "Bessie" Fisher Stastny (1921)

A. J. Stasny Music Co. was an American publisher of popular sheet music. The firm was chartered as a New York corporation in 1922 by Betty "Bessie" Stastny (née Fisher) (1882–1974) and her husband, Anthony John Stastny (1885–1923), and M. Kerr – although, there was music published from as early as 1908 bearing the name A. J. Stasny Music Co. Cleveland, Ohio. A. J. Stasny and his wife had moved from Cleveland to New York in 1910. The New York firm was based out of the Tin Pan Alley district of Manhattan, New York. By 1920, the firm had grown into one of the largest music publishing companies in the country with branch offices in 18 large cities, including Philadelphia, Chicago, San Francisco, and London – with over 200 employees and grossing over one million dollars a year.

The company is currently privately held by an heir, Eleanor Fisher — 29 Green Grove Avenue, Keyport, New Jersey.

== Selected hits ==
=== Anthony J. Stastny Music Co., Cleveland ===
- "Thurston: March & Two Step," by Anthony J. Stastny (1911) OCLC 435095877
- "That's Some Kiss," words by M. Wolfe, music by E. Wagner (1912) Library of Congress: Historic Sheet Music Collection, 1800–1922
- "If You But Only Loved Me, Dear," words & music by Marion T. Bohannon (1909)

=== A. J. Stasny Music Co., New York ===
- "Down Where the Tennessee Flows," words by Ray Sherwood, music by Bert L. Rule (1913) OCLC 165088879
- "I Did It All For You," words by Ray Sherwood, music by Bert L. Rule (1914) OCLC 665047875
- "I'm Goin Back to Old Nebraska," words by Ray Sherwood, music by Bert L. Rule (1914) OCLC 48497850
- "There's a Girl That's Meant for Me: in the Heart of Tennessee," words by Ray Sherwood, music by Bert L. Rule (1914) OCLC 20120844
- "Why Shouldn't I Love You," words by Ray Sherwood, music by Bert L. Rule (1915) OCLC 657982062
- "I Found You Among the Roses," words and music by George B. Pitman (1915) OCLC 20119431
- "Mr. Ford You've Got the Right Idea," words by Ray Sherwood, music by J. Fred'k Coots (1916) OCLC 726927577
- "When I Dream Of The Girl Of My Dreams," words by Ray Sherwood, music by J. Fred'k Coots (1916)
- "When Yankee Doodle Learns to 'parlez vous Français,'" words by Will. Hart, music by Edward G. Nelson (1917) OCLC 7427244
- "When We Reach That Old Port Somewhere in France," words by Al Selden, music by Sam H. Stept, cover illustration by Strauss, Peyton, Albert Barbelle (1917) OCLC 7430371
- "It's Never Too Late to be Sorry," words by James E. Dempsey, music by Joseph A. Burke (1918) OCLC 26003791
- "A Soldier's Rosary," words by James E. Dempsey, music by Joseph A. Burke (1918) OCLC 5689376
- "Welcome Home," words, by Bud Green, music by Ed. G. Nelson (1918) OCLC 20267232
- "Rose Dreams," poem by J. R. Shannon, music by A. J. Stasny (1918) OCLC 223083620 OCLC 60131033 OCLC 20120554
- "Girl of Mine," words and music by Harold Freeman (previously copyrighted by H. Federoff, 1917) (1919) OCLC 10445517 OCLC 488363585
- "I'm Not Jealous: But I Just Don't Like It," words by Harry Pease, music by Ed. G. Nelson & Fred Mayo (1919) OCLC 2209801
- "Evening: Brings Love Dreams of You," words by Haven Gillespie, music by Earl Burtnett (1919) OCLC 20267210
- "Oh! How I Miss You Mammy," words by Max C. Freedman, music by Harry D. Squires (1920) OCLC 51731620
- "My Day Will Come When Your Day's Gone," by Monte Carlo and Alma Sanders (1924) OCLC 367878339

== Company personnel ==
- Tom Houston – Philadelphia office
- Earl Burtnett – San Francisco office
- Miss M. Kurz
