= Out of Mind, Out of Sight =

Out of Mind, Out of Sight may refer to:

- "Out of Mind, Out of Sight" (Buffy the Vampire Slayer), a 1997 television episode
- "Out of Mind, Out of Sight" (song), a 1985 song by the Australian group Models
- Out of Mind, Out of Sight (album), a 1985 album by the Australian group Models
- Out of Mind, Out of Sight (film), a 2014 Canadian documentary film by John Kastner

== See also ==
- Out of Mind (disambiguation)
- Out of Sight (disambiguation)
- "Out of Sight, Out of Mind", a 1976 episode of the M*A*S*H television series
- Out of Sight, Out of Mind (1990 film), a 1990 film directed by Greydon Clark
- Outta Sight/Outta Mind, 2004 album by The Datsuns
- "Outtasite (Outta Mind)", 1996 song by Wilco
