= Anthony J. Stastny =

Anthony John Stastny
- Born: Anthony John Stastny; June 3, 1885; Cleveland, Ohio, U.S.
- Died: April 17, 1923 (aged 37); Manhattan, New York, U.S.
- Occupations: Composer, publisher
- Height: 5 ft 11 in (180 cm)

Anthony John Stastny (June 3, 1885 – April 17, 1923) was an American composer and founder of one of the largest music publishing firms in North America during the 1920s — A. J. Stasny Music Co. Sometime after 1910, he modified the original Bohemian spelling of his surname to Stasny.

== Biography ==
Anthony was the born in Cleveland, Ohio, to Frank Stastny (1857–1913) and Barbara Stastny (née Barbara Aneska Vlk; 1863–1945), both immigrants from Bohemia. He had a brother, Frank W. Stastny, Jr. (1883–1936), and a sister, Mary M. Stastny (Mrs. Edward Frank Soika) (1882–1967).

Anthony and his publishing company were originally located in Cleveland. In 1910, he relocated to New York City. He composed numerous popular songs and piano solo works. Stasny had also been the musical director for Howard Thurston, magician.

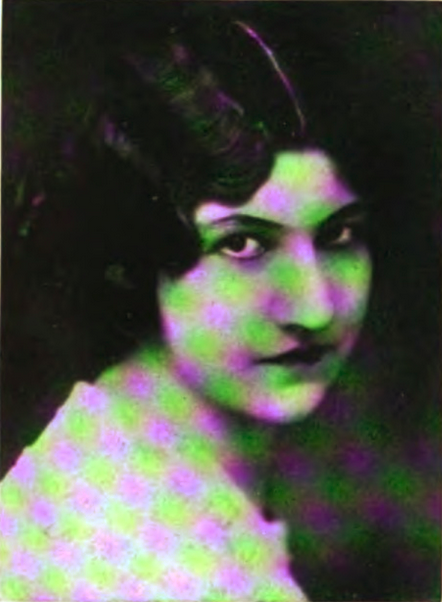
Betty Stastny (1921)

His wife — Betty (Bessie) Stasny (née Fisher; died November 19, 1974), — had served as president of the publishing company after his death. Prior to marrying Anthony, she had been on the stage, playing with Eddy Foy, Al Jolson, and Nora Bayes.

Anthony died in Manhattan, New York, and was buried at Lake View Cemetery, Cleveland. Betty Stastny was interred at Fairview Cemetery Red Bank, New Jersey.

== Selected compositions ==
- Rose dreams, song, founded on the melody of the famous Rose dreams reverie, poem by J.R. Shannon, music by A.J. Stasny (1916)
- The Cactus and the Rose: a Western Idyl, by A.J. Stastny & M.T. Bohannon, A.J. Stastny Music Co. (1918) OCLC 51550225
- Dance Of The Moon Birds, by A. J. Stanstny, A. J. Stastny Music Co., Cleveland (1911) OCLC 25847773
- High Stepper March & Two Step, arr. by A. L. Maresh (1907) OCLC 739098492
- An Arabian Fantasy (1923)
- Don't Waste Your Tears Over Me, words and music by A.J. Stasny (1923) OCLC 20597726
