= A Soldier's Rosary =

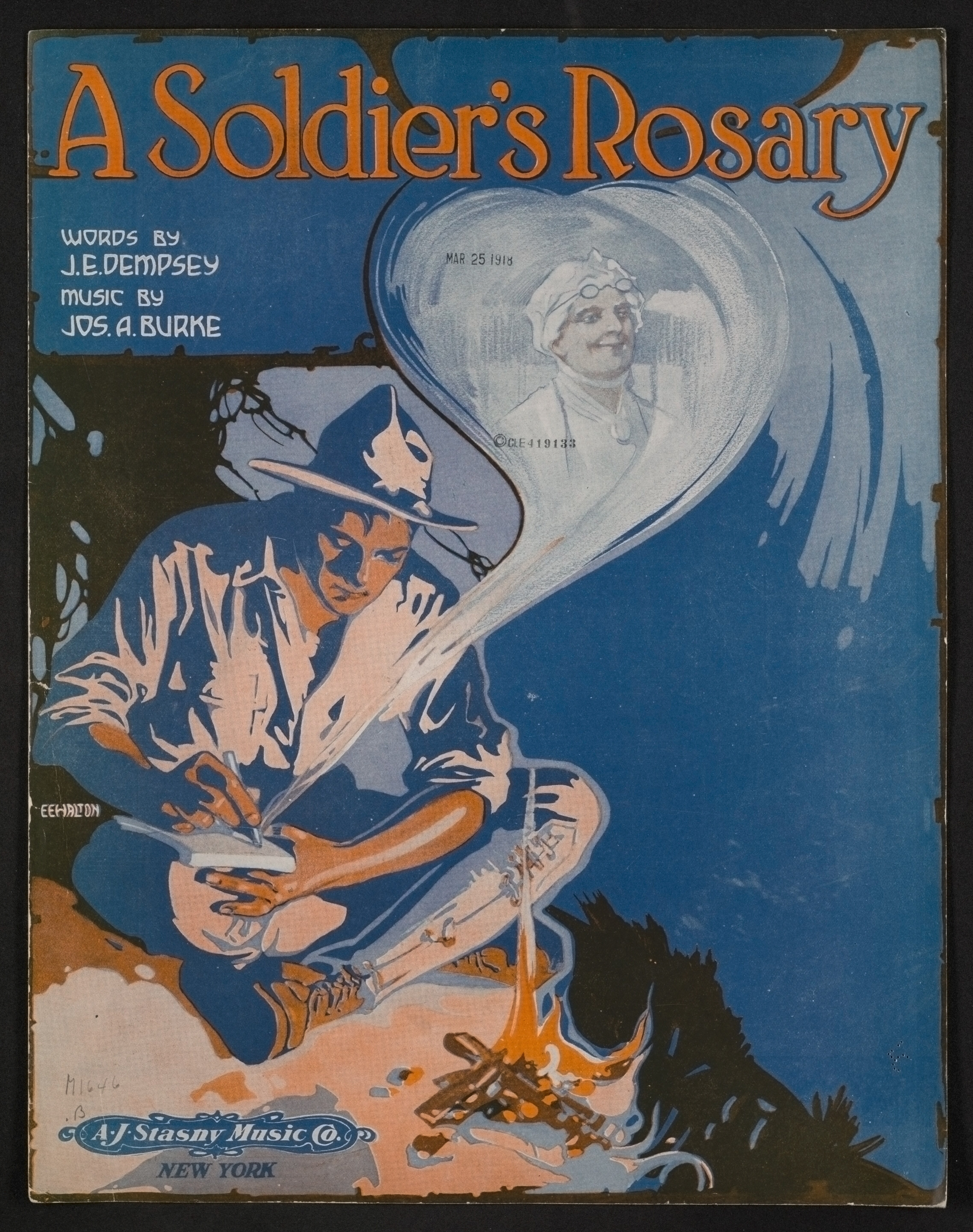
- Sheet music cover

Song
- Published: 1918
- Songwriters: Composer: Joseph A. Burke; Lyricist: J. E. Dempsey

"A Soldier's Rosary" is a 1918 song composed by Joseph A. Burke with lyrics by J. E. Dempsey. The 1918 publication, by the A. J. Stasny Music Co., featured a cover illustration by E. E. Walton.

The song tells of a mother exhorting her soldier son to remember to say his nightly prayers, while the singer comforts the mother with the thought that the soldier's actions are all the prayer he needs, saying "He serves his maker when he serves his country's needs." The song compares the bullets of war to the beads on the rosary, and the soldier's ultimate death is concluded as "a soldier's rosary".

== Analysis ==
In Born in the U.S.A.: The Myth of American Popular Music from Colonial Times, Timothy Sheurer argues that "A Soldier's Rosary" perpetuates the American myth of divine destiny, that the American ideal serves a higher purpose. By equating the soldier's actions with prayer, his ultimate death is given higher purpose.
