= Out of Time =

Out of Time may refer to:

== Film ==
- Out of Time (1988 film), an American television science fiction film
- Out of Time, a 2000 American television film directed by Ernest Thompson
- Out of Time (2003 film), an American thriller directed by Carl Franklin
- Out of Time, a 2004 short directed by Blake Ritson
- Out of Time, an Austrian film named best documentary at the 2007 Seattle International Film Festival

== Music ==
- Out of Time (album), by R.E.M., 1991
- "Out of Time" (Blur song), 2003
- "Out of Time" (Noel song), 1988
- "Out of Time" (Rolling Stones song), 1966, successfully covered by Chris Farlowe
- "Out of Time" (The Weeknd song), 2022
- "Out of Time" (Stone Temple Pilots song), 2013
- "Out of Time", a song by Bradley Cooper from the A Star Is Born film soundtrack, 2018
- "Out of Time, a song by A Day to Remember from What Separates Me from You, 2010

== Television episodes ==
- "Out of Time" (CSI: Miami), 2009
- "Out of Time" (Fantastic Four: World's Greatest Heroes), 2007
- "Out of Time" (The Flash), 2015
- "Out of Time" (Heroes), 2007
- "Out of Time" (Legends of Tomorrow), 2016
- "Out of Time" (Red Dwarf), 1993
- "Out of Time" (Torchwood), 2006

== Other uses ==
- Out of Time, a 1990 novel by Paula Martinac
- Out of Time (novel), a 1996 young-adult novel by Caroline B. Cooney
- MINERVA: Out of Time, the sequel mod to MINERVA: Metastasis
- Out of time (law), any time later than the latest date after the event, by which civil or criminal action may be taken

== See also ==
- Outta Time (disambiguation)
- Out of Mind (disambiguation)
