= J. Fred Coots =

American songwriter (1897–1985)

Background information
- Also known as: J. Fred Coots; Fred Coots
- Born: John Frederick Coots; May 2, 1897
- Origin: Brooklyn, New York, U.S.
- Died: April 8, 1985 (aged 87) New York City, U.S.
- Genres: Tin Pan Alley
- Occupation: Composer
- Instrument: Piano

John Frederick Coots, better known as J. Fred Coots or Fred Coots, (May 2, 1897 – April 8, 1985) was an American songwriter. He composed more than 700 popular songs and more than a dozen Broadway shows. In 1934, Coots wrote the melody with his then chief collaborator, lyricist Haven Gillespie, for the biggest success of either man's career, "Santa Claus Is Comin' to Town." The song became one of the biggest sellers in American history.

In 1934, when Gillespie brought him the lyrics to "Santa Claus Is Coming To Town", Coots developed the outline of the melody in just ten minutes. Coots took the song to his publisher, Leo Feist, who liked it but thought it was "a kids' song" and didn't expect too much from it. Coots offered the song to Eddie Cantor who used it for his radio show that November and it became an instant success. The morning after the radio show there were orders for 100,000 copies of sheet music and by Christmas sales had passed 400,000.

== Biography ==
Coots was born in 1897 in Brooklyn, New York (Note: Several biographies state that John Frederick Coots was born in Brooklyn. He married Marjorie Decker Jennings on February 18, 1924, in Manhattan. Their marriage license states that he was born in Brooklyn. Also, his World War I Draft Registration Card states that he was born in Brooklyn. However, an April 6, 1930, New York Times article, "In the Spotlight's Glare," states that he was born in Keene, New Hampshire.) When he was 17 years old, he began to work for Farmers' Loan & Trust Co. in New York In 1916, his first successful song was published, "Mr. Ford You've Got The Right Idea," words by Ray Sherwood, music by Coots; A. J. Stasny Music Co., publisher OCLC 726927577 In 1919, actor-producer Eddie Dowling gave Coots his first chance at writing a musical score for Friars' Frolics. In 1922, Dowling commissioned Coots to write the songs for Sally, Irene and Mary, a show which ran for two years on Broadway. In 1928, he wrote "Doin' The Raccoon". He relocated to Los Angeles the next year. In 1931, he wrote "Love Letters in the Sand" In 1934, he wrote the songs "Santa Claus Is Comin' to Town" (more than 4 million copies of sheet music sold) and "For All We Know" In 1940, he wrote "The Rangers' Victory Song"; (Note: Vol. 35, No. 4, 1940, pg. 569) OCLC 812404397 He married Marjorie Decker Jennings on February 18, 1924, in Manhattan. He died in 1985 in a New York City hospital, after a lengthy illness

== Selected songs ==
- "Santa Claus Is Comin' to Town," words by Haven Gillespie, music by Coots

Leo Feist, Inc., publisher (1934); OCLC 21070165, 11064929
© September 27, 1934, Class E unpublished 93634, Leo Feist, Inc., New York (Note: Vol. 29, No. 9, 1934, pg. 892)
© October 23, 1934, Class E published 44456, October 25, 1934, Leo Feist, Inc. (Note: Vol. 29, No. 9, 1934, pg. 990)
© Renewal September 27, 1961, R28248025, Haven Gillespie and J. Fred Coots
© Renewal October 25, 1961, R283907, Haven Gillespie and J. Fred Coots (Note: Vol. 15, Part 5, No. 2, July–December 1961, pg. 246, pg. 1706)

- "You Go to My Head," words by Haven Gillespie, music by Coots

Remick Music (1938); OCLC 44053966, 858643370

- "Louisiana Fairy Tale," words and music by Mitchell Parish, Haven Gillespie, and Coots

Mills Music (1935); OCLC 27211518
© April 5, 1935, Class E 47450, Mills Music, Inc., New York (Note: Vol. 30, No. 4, 1935, pg. 406)

- "For All We Know," words by Sam M. Lewis, music by Coots

Leo Feist, Inc. (1934); OCLC 21070175, 40509506
© March 14, 1934, Class E unpublished 84751, Leo Feist, Inc., New York (Note: Vol. 30, No. 3, 1935, pg. 246)

- "I Still Get a Thrill (Thinking of You)," words by Benny Davis, music by Coots

Davis, Coots & Engel (Note: Harry Engel (1894 Vienna, Austria – 1965 Los Angeles) had been a sheet music traveling salesman for Richmond-Robbins, Inc. — Maurice Aaron Richmond (1878–1965) and nephew, John J. (Jack) Robbins (1894–1959) — then Robbins-Engel, Inc., the Irving Berlin; then after his affiliation with Davis, Coots & Engel, Inc., he later became head of West Coast Operations for BMI) (1930); OCLC 13168438

- "There's Honey On The Moon Tonight," words by Haven Gillespie and Mack Davis, music by Coots

Miller Music, Inc. (1938); OCLC 22925119

== Selected musicals ==
- Sally, Irene and Mary, music by Coots, words by Raymond W. Klages (1888–1947), March 23, 1925 – April 4, 1925 & September 4, 1922 – June 2, 1923 OCLC 498812201, 498526150
1. "Kid Days"
2. "Time Will Tell" OCLC 39975531, 224102588
3. "Pals"
4. "Stage Door Johnnies"
5. "I Wonder Why" OCLC 20597875
6. "Do You Remember?"
7. "How I've Missed You Mary" OCLC 891128783
8. "Right Boy Comes Along"
9. "Our Home Sweet Home"
10. "Peacock Alley"
11. "Something in Here"
12. "Opportunity"
13. "We Are Waiting"
14. "Clouds Roll By" OCLC 498831287
15. "Until You Say Yes"
16. "Wedding Time"
17. "Old Fashioned Gown" OCLC 755811220, 498526150
18. "When a Regular Boy Loves a Regular Girl" OCLC 755811215, 497282681
19. "Up on Fifth Avenue Near Central Park"
20. "Jimmy" OCLC 497894150
- Sons O' Guns, music by Coots, November 26, 1929 – August 9, 1930
- Broadway Nights, featuring songs by Coots, July 15, 1929 – August 17, 1929
- George White's Scandals, musical review, featuring songs by Coots, July 2, 1928 – January 19, 1929
- White Lights, music by Coots, October 11, 1927 – November 5, 1927
- Gay Paree, musical review, music and lyrics by Coots, November 9, 1926 – April 9, 1927 & August 18, 1925 – January 30, 1926
- A Night in Paris, musical review, music by Coots, July 26, 1926 – October 30, 1926 & January 5, 1926 – July 10, 1926
- The Merry World, musical review, music by Coots, June 8, 1926 – August 21, 1926
- Mayflowers, music by Coots, November 24, 1925 – January 30, 1926
- June Days, musical, music by Coots, August 6, 1925 – October 17, 1925
- Artists and Models, musical review, music by Coots, June 24, 1925 – May 7, 1926
- Artists and Models, musical review, music by Coots, October 15, 1924 – May 23, 1925
- Innocent Eyes, musical review, additional music by Coots, May 20, 1924 – August 30, 1924
- Dew Drop Inn, musical comedy, featuring songs by Coots, May 17, 1923 – August 25, 1923
- Spice of 1922, musical review, music by Coots, July 6, 1922 – September 9, 1922

== Notes and references ==
Notes

Original copyrights

Catalog of Copyright Entries, Part 3 Musical Compositions, New Series, Library of Congress, Copyright Office

Copyright renewals

Catalog of Copyright Entries, Part 3, Musical Compositions, Third Series, Library of Congress, Copyright Office

Inline citations
