= Missouri Waltz =

Official state song of Missouri

- 1914 Forster Music Publisher version
- State anthem of Missouri
- Also known as: Hush-a-bye, ma baby, slumbertime is comin' soon
- Lyrics: James Royce Shannon, 1914
- Music: Lee Edgar Settle (arranged by Frederic Knight Logan), 1914
- Adopted: June 30, 1949

Audio sample
- First vocal recording of Missouri Waltz (by Edna Brown): file; help

"Missouri Waltz" is the official state song of Missouri and is associated with the University of Missouri.

== History ==
The "Missouri Waltz", which had originally been a minstrel (later ragtime and big band before it finally became country and bluegrass) song, became the state song under an act adopted by the General Assembly on June 30, 1949. The song came from a melody John Valentine Eppel heard Lee Edgar Settle play. Settle was a well-known ragtime piano player and the song he wrote and played, The Graveyard Waltz, was the actual melody for the Missouri Waltz. John V. Eppel claimed he wrote it but it was well known at the time that Lee Edgar Settle actually wrote the melody. The Missouri Waltz was arranged by Frederic Knight Logan, using lyrics written by James Royce Shannon. First published in 1914, early popular versions were by The Victor Military Band, Prince's Orchestra, Jaudas' Society Orchestra, Elsie West Baker, Henry Burr & Albert Campbell, and by Earl Fuller. The song enjoyed fresh success in 1939 when it was featured in the film The Story of Vernon and Irene Castle by Fred Astaire and Ginger Rogers.

Sales increased substantially after Missourian Harry S. Truman became president, and it was reported that the "Missouri Waltz" was his favorite song. Although, when asked about his feelings the following reply was published by the White House:

"President's attitude towards the song? He can take it or leave it. Is it really his favorite? No. Does he play it often? No. Is Margaret ever heard singing it? No. What is the President's reaction to song's adoption by Missouri as state song? See answer to first question."

Although the song is often associated with Harry Truman, the president did not claim it as his favorite song. In fact, he had this to say about it in a television interview: "If you let me say what I think, I don't give a ... about it, but I can't say it out loud because it's the song of Missouri. It's as bad as 'The Star-Spangled Banner' as far as music is concerned."

The song was performed a capella by Marideth Sisco for the opening scene of the 2010 film Winter's Bone which starred Jennifer Lawrence in her breakout role.

The song is played by the University of Missouri's Marching Mizzou at every home football game to a unique marching style in 3/4 time. It is also played by Mini Mizzou, a smaller ensemble composed of Marching Mizzou musicians, at every home basketball game. It is tradition for the crowd to wave their arms left and right during the first verse and then switch to clapping to the beat during the refrain at both football and basketball games.

In 2019, singer Linda Ronstadt reported that the "Missouri Waltz" had been an earworm in recent years.

== Lyrics ==
Hush-a-bye, ma baby, slumbertime is comin' soon;
Rest yo' head upon my breast while Mommy hums a tune;
The sandman is callin' where shadows are fallin',
While the soft breezes sigh as in days long gone by.

Way down in Missouri where I heard this melody,
When I was a little child upon my Mommy's knee;
The old folks were hummin'; their banjos were strummin';
So sweet and low.

Strum, strum, strum, strum, strum,
Seems I hear those banjos playin' once again,
Hum, hum, hum, hum, hum,
That same old plaintive strain.

Hear that mournful melody,
It just haunts you the whole day long,
And you wander in dreams back to heaven, it seems,
When you hear that old time song.

Hush-a-bye ma baby, go to sleep on Mommy's knee,
Journey back to paradise in dreams again with me;
It seems like your Mommy is there once again,
And the old folks were strummin' that same old refrain.

Way down in Missouri where I learned this lullaby,
When the stars were blinkin' and the moon was climbin' high,
Seems I hear voices low, as in days long ago,
Singin' hush-a-bye.

The original 1914 lyrics:
Hush-a-bye, ma baby, slumbertime is comin' soon;
Rest yo' head upon my chest while Mammy hums a tune;
The sandman is callin' where shadows are fallin',
While the soft breezes sigh as in days long gone by.

Way down in Missouri where I heard this melody,
When I was a Pickaninny on ma Mammy's knee;
The darkies were hummin'; their banjos were strummin';
So sweet and low.

Strum, strum, strum, strum, strum,
Seems I hear those banjos playin' once again,
Hum, hum, hum, hum, hum,
That same old plaintive strain.

Hear that mournful melody,
It just haunts you the whole day long,
And you wander in dreams back to Dixie, it seems,
When you hear that old time song.

Hush-a-bye ma baby, go to sleep on Mammy's knee,
Journey back to Dixieland in dreams again with me;
It seems like your Mammy was there once again,
And the darkies were strummin' that same old refrain.

Way down in Missouri where I learned this lullaby,
When the stars were blinkin' and the moon was climbin' high,
And I hear Mammy Cloe, as in days long ago,
Singin' hush-a-bye.

== Other notable recordings ==
- Bing Crosby – recorded June 9, 1939 with John Scott Trotter and His Orchestra.
- The Fontane Sisters – recorded for Musicraft Records in 1946.
- Gene Autry – recorded in December 1947 for Columbia Records (catalog No. 20524)
- Mance Lipscomb – recorded May 2, 1964, released in 1993 by Arhoolie Records (catalog # CD 398). Lipscomb learned to play it when he was a boy, from his father who was a fiddler.
- Mantovani (1962)
- Paul Whiteman – recorded September 21, 1927 with a vocal group comprising Bing Crosby, Al Rinker, Charles Gaylord, Jack Fulton and Austin Young.
- Perry Como – recorded December 14, 1948
- Roy Fox and his Band (vocal: Al Bowlly) – recorded January 24, 1931 (Al Bowlly Discography)
- Johnny Cash – recorded during lifetime and released 2006

== See also ==
- List of best-selling sheet music
