= George Graff Jr. =

George Graff Jr. (5 August 1886 – 24 January 1973) was an American songwriter.

Graff was born in New York City. He wrote the lyrics to "When Irish Eyes Are Smiling" along with Chauncey Olcott for Olcott's production of The Isle O' Dreams in 1912.

He collaborated on many other songs with either Arthur Fields or Ernest Ball, and was a charter member of ASCAP.

Graff appeared as a contestant on the CBS television program, I've Got a Secret, on the March 16, 1960 episode. His secret was, “I wrote ‘When Irish Eyes Are Smiling’”.

George Graff died in Stroudsburg, Pennsylvania in 1973, at the age of 86.
