= Out of Mind =

Out of Mind may refer to:

- Out of Mind (Stargate SG-1), episode of the television series Stargate SG-1
- "Out of Mind", ninth movement of Mike Oldfield's Guitars album
- "Out of Mind" (song), a 2013 song by Tove Lo
- "Out of Mind", song from EP001 by thenewno2
- Out of Mind, 1984 novel by J. Bernlef
- Red vs. Blue: Out of Mind, a 2006 machinima miniseries

== See also ==
- Out of Mind, Out of Sight (disambiguation)
