= James Royce Shannon =

American composer and lyricist (1881-1946)

- Born: May 13, 1881; Adrian, Michigan, US
- Died: May 19, 1946 (aged 65); Pontiac, Michigan, US
- Resting place: Oak Hill Cemetery, Pontiac, U.S.
- Occupations: Composer and lyricist
- Notable work: The Missouri Waltz; Too Ra Loo Ra Loo Ral
- Children: 1

James Royce Shannon (May 13, 1881 – May 19, 1946), born James Royce, was an Irish-American composer and lyricist. He was nationally prominent and active at the time of Tin Pan Alley.

== Biography ==
Shannon was born in Adrian, Michigan. He is known chiefly for writing the lyrics to "The Missouri Waltz" (the state song of Missouri) and for composing the song "Too Ra Loo Ra Loo Ral" ("Irish Lullaby").

He began his musical writing career in collaboration with his mother, Eliza Shannon. His first significant composition was "Too Ra Loo Ra Loo Ral," which was one of the songs composed by Shannon for Chauncey Olcott's musical Shameen Dhu, which successfully debuted in New York City in February 1914. The "Irish Lullaby" became more famous decades later when it was included in the film Going My Way. It reached # 4 on the Billboard charts, sold over a million copies, and was included in one of Bing Crosby's albums.

Residing primarily in Detroit during his career, Shannon owned and operated a theatrical company that toured both in the U.S. and in Europe. He was the manager for a chain of music stores in Michigan, and the assistant manager for Detroit's Majestic Theatre; he also worked as a drama critic for the Detroit Free Press.

== Selected works ==
- Shannon, J. R. Dixie Lou. Detroit: Grinnell Bros. Music Pub, 1913. OCLC 25403236
- Shannon, J. R., and Frederic Knight Logan. Hush-a-Bye, Ma Baby: The Missouri Waltz. Chicago: Forster Music, 1916. OCLC 9022193
- Shannon, J. R., and Charles L. Johnson. I'll Be Waiting for You. Chicago: F.J.A. Forster, 1915. OCLC 499142067
- Shannon, J. R., and Fred Ziemer. There's a Red Bordered Flag in the Window. Vandersloot Music Pub. Co., 1918. OCLC 71781357
- Shannon, J. R. Too-Ra-Loo-Ra-Loo-Ral: That's an Irish Lullaby: Sung by Bing Crosby in the Paramount Picture Going My Way. New York: Witmark, 1944. OCLC 20120848
- Shannon, J. R. Where That Ragtime River Flows. Detroit: Grinnell Bros, 1912. OCLC 63188226
- Shannon, J. R., and Fred Ziemer. Yankee Boy. Williamsport, Pa: Vandersloot Music Pub. Co, 1918. OCLC 31223093
