= My Wild Irish Rose =

1947 film by David Butler

- Theatrical release poster and DVD Cover
- Directed by: David Butler
- Screenplay by: Peter Milne; Edwin Gilbert; Sidney Fields
- Based on: Song in His Heart; 1939 book by Rita Olcott
- Produced by: William Jacobs
- Starring: Dennis Morgan
- Cinematography: Arthur Edeson; William V. Skall
- Edited by: Irene Morra
- Music by: Max Steiner; Ray Heindorf
- Production company: Warner Bros.
- Distributed by: Warner Bros. Pictures
- Release date: December 24, 1947 (New York City)
- Running time: 101 minutes
- Country: United States
- Language: English
- Budget: $3,540,000
- Box office: $3.4 million (US rentals) or $4,890,000

My Wild Irish Rose is a 1947 American musical film directed by David Butler. It stars Dennis Morgan and Arlene Dahl (in her debut film). It was nominated for an Academy Award in 1948.

== Plot ==
A fictionalized biopic of Chauncey Olcott, the movie traces the rise of an Irish-American tenor to stardom at the end of the 19th century and start of the 20th.

== Cast ==
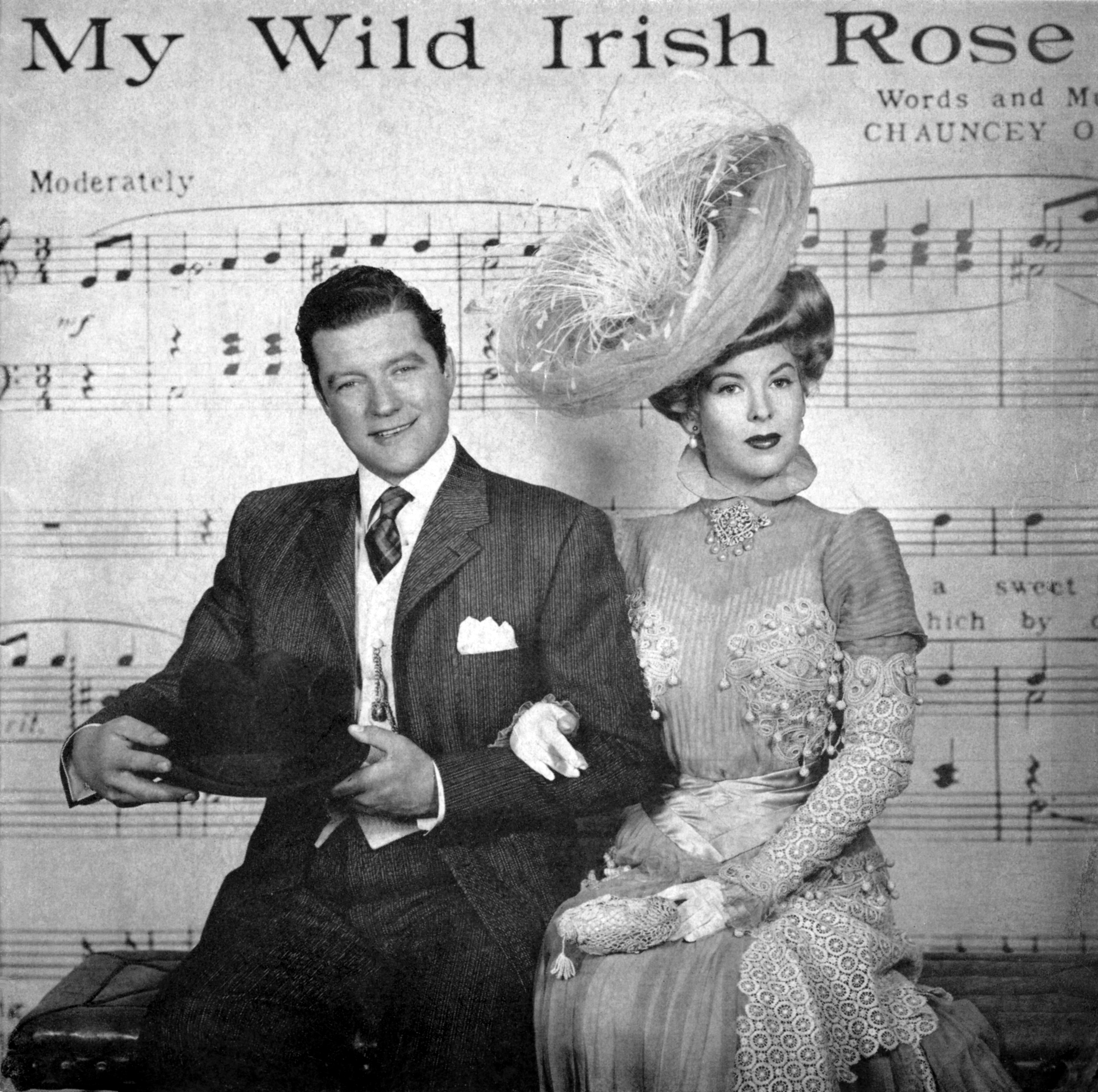
Dennis Morgan and Andrea King in My Wild Irish Rose

- Dennis Morgan as Chauncey Olcott
- Arlene Dahl as Rose Donovan
- Andrea King as Lillian Russell
- Alan Hale Sr. as John Donovan
- George Tobias as Nick Popolis
- Ben Blue as Hopper
- George O'Brien as William "Duke" Muldoon
- William Frawley as William J. Scanlan

== Soundtrack ==
Olcott's original composition of the same name was included in the film's music and was nominated for an Academy Award for Best Scoring of a Musical Picture.

== Box office ==
According to Warner Bros. records, the film earned $3,921,000 in the U.S. and $969,000 in other markets.
