= Running Out of Time relay =

Relay event

Running Out of Time
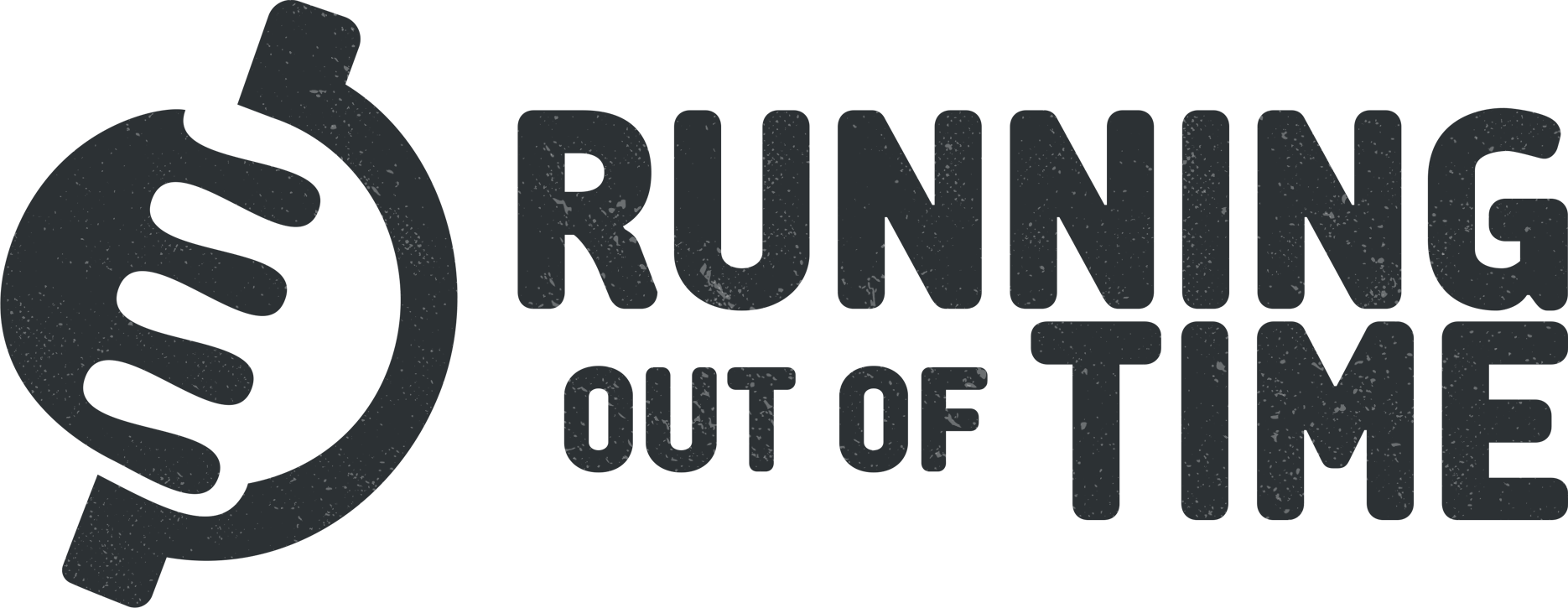
- logo
- Date: 30 September 2022; 4 years ago
- Location: 18 countries
- Event type: relay
- Distance: 7,767 kilometres (4,826 mi)
- Website: running-out-of-time.com

Running Out of Time is a relay event used to promote discussion about climate change. It was the longest non-stop relay ever attempted with runners, cyclists and sailors working together to pass a baton hand-to-hand from COP26 in Glasgow to COP27 in Sharm El Sheikh. The baton moved non-stop through 18 countries: UK, France, Belgium, Netherlands, Germany, Austria, Italy, Slovenia, Croatia, Bosnia and Herzegovina, Montenegro, Albania, Greece, Cyprus, Israel and Egypt. The journey of 7,767 kilometres (4,826 mi) took forty days.

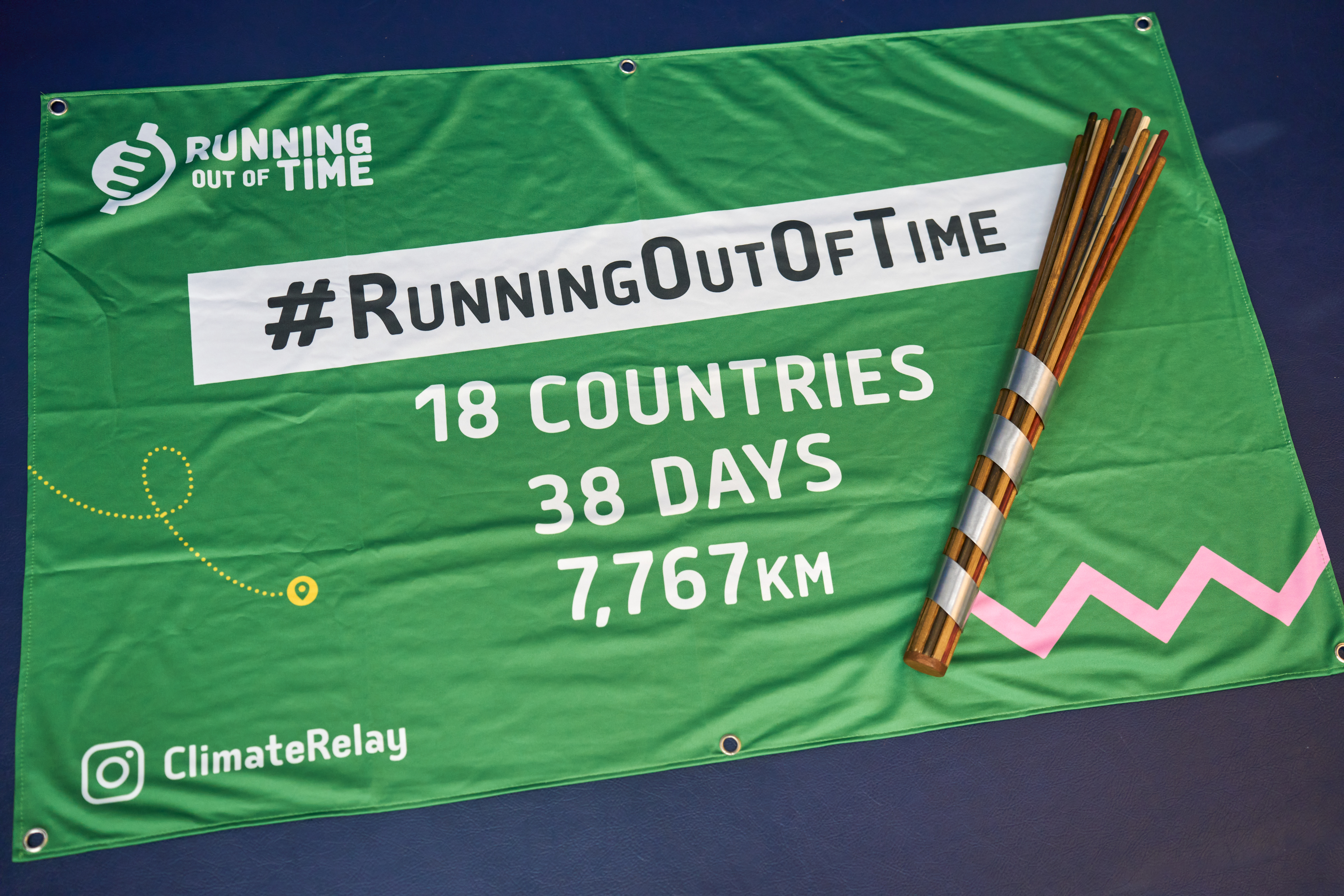
Flag and baton
