= Marideth Sisco =

American singer and journalist (1943–2026)

Marideth Ann Sisco (June 15, 1943 – May 18, 2026) was an American storyteller, folklorist, singer-songwriter, author, and journalist. Her work largely focused on folklore related to her native Ozark Mountains. Sisco and her music were featured in the Oscar-nominated film Winter's Bone. In 2023 she was a featured artist at the 2023 Smithsonian Folklife Festival, where she performed both in song and as a storyteller.

== Early life ==
Sisco was born in Missouri on June 15, 1943, to Marguerite Elenor (Gentry) Sisco (1920–1966) and Paul Holtz Sisco (1923–1966). Her interest in music started when she was three and a great uncle taught and encouraged her to sing. Her family moved frequently when she was young, including time spent in Kansas, Washington state, Montana, and California. As she grew older she became tired of moving around and returned to live with her grandmother in Butterfield and graduated from high school in Cassville, Missouri, in 1961.

After high school, Sisco attended Missouri State University (then known as Southwest Missouri State College) in Springfield, Missouri, where she studied performance and orchestration. But she left before finishing a degree after being told that as a woman she would not be successful in the field and was instead encouraged to switch to music education.

In 1965, Sisco left the Ozarks and moved to California, where she hoped to break into the music business as a singer, but lack of success and a hand injury that left her unable to play guitar derailed that goal. In 1976 she left California, helping her aunt and ailing uncle return to Missouri, but with the intention of moving back west, which she never did.

== Career ==
After returning to Missouri, Sisco received a BFA from Missouri State University and later an MA from Antioch University. She also began a 20-year career as a journalist at the West Plains Quill in West Plains, Missouri, where she worked as an investigative and environmental writer. She also authored the "Crosspatch" gardening column.

Upon her retirement from journalism in 2005, she returned to songwriting.

In her later years, Sisco hosted These Ozark Hills, a local culture and folklore radio program on Ozarks Public Radio at KSMU-FM, based out of Missouri State University. As a singer, she performed both solo and with The Blackberry Winter Band.

=== Winter's Bone ===
Through a chance encounter at a singing party, Sisco was involved in the Oscar-nominated 2010 film Winter's Bone, based on the book by Daniel Woodrell. In the film's production she served as a musical consultant and singer, as well as appearing in the film as a singer. Her scene in the film was written specifically to feature her singing.

Sisco also contributed to the film by singing "Missouri Waltz" for its opening scenes, though she reworked it to remove racist language from the song. Following the release of the film she toured with the Blackberry Winter Band to promote the soundtrack, referring to it as Amazing Geriatric Hillbilly tour. They played in 27 cities in the United States and Canada.

== Personal life and death ==
Sisco was a lesbian and was active in LGBTQ+ causes. She died on May 18, 2026, at the age of 82.

== Recognition ==
In 2018, Sisco received the Quill Award for lifetime achievement from the Missouri Writers Hall of Fame and the Missouri Folk Arts Program has also designated her a Missouri Master Storyteller.

== Bibliography ==
- 2012: Close Enough to Home
- 2015: Crosspatch: Cranky Musing on Gardening in Rocky Ground

== Discography ==
- 2019: In These Ozark Hills (with Blackberry Winter)
- 2017: Empty Doors
- 2013: Still Standing (with Blackberry Winter)
