= Chauncey Olcott =

American actor and musician

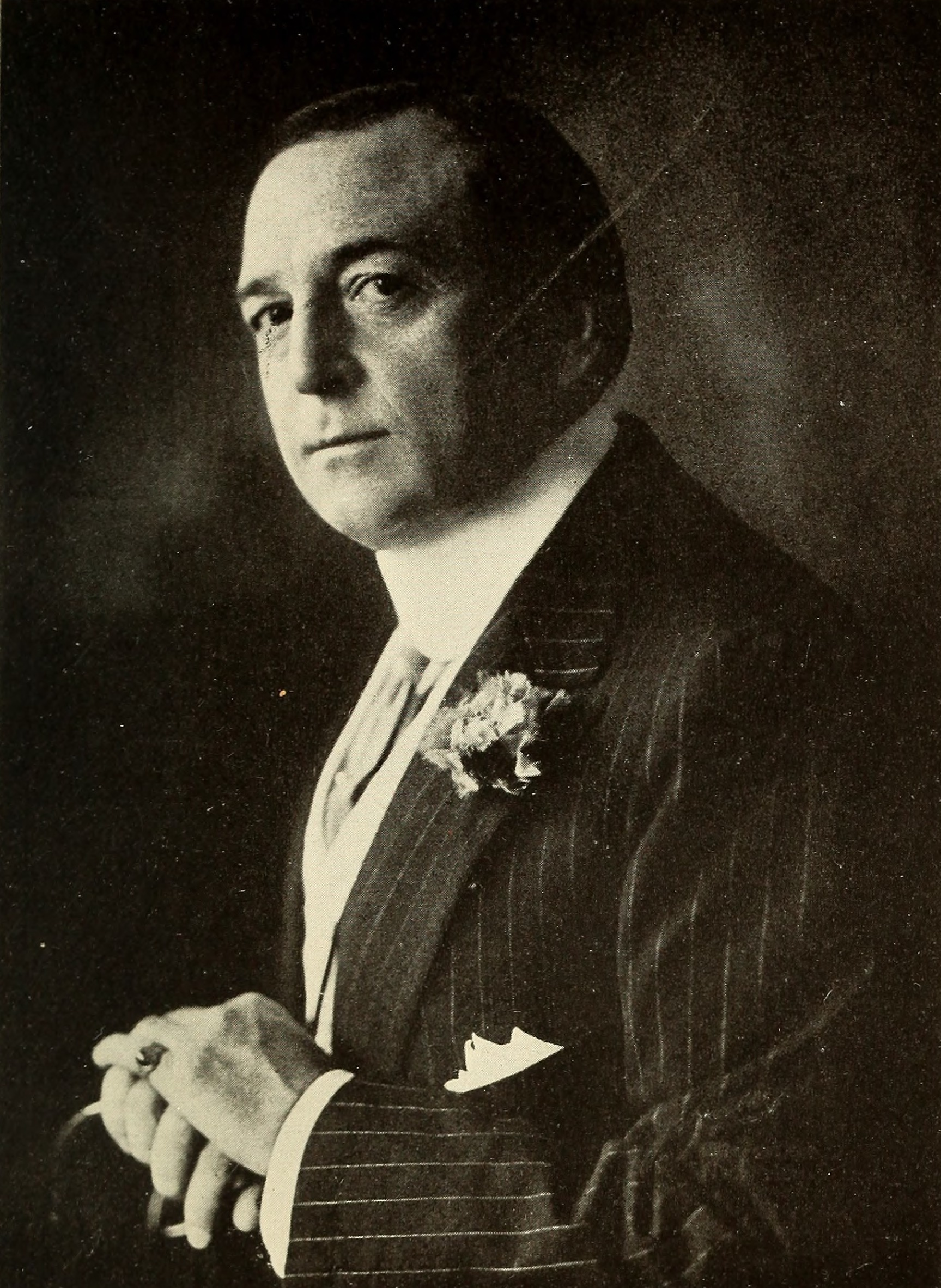
- Born: John Chancellor Olcott; July 21, 1858; Buffalo, New York, U.S.
- Died: March 18, 1932 (aged 73); Monte Carlo, Monaco
- Resting place: Woodlawn Cemetery, New York City, United States
- Spouses: Cora Estell Henderson; Margaret O'Donovan
- Awards: Songwriters Hall of Fame

Chauncey Olcott, born John Chancellor Olcott and often spelled Chauncey Alcott (July 21, 1858 – March 18, 1932), was an American stage actor, songwriter and singer of Irish descent.

== Biography ==
He was born in Buffalo, New York. While standard biographical sources list Olcott's birth year as 1858, United States federal census records from 1860, 1870, and 1880 list his age as 3, 13, and 23 respectively, consistently pointing towards 1857 as his year of birth. His mother, Margaret (née Doyle), was a native of Killeagh, County Cork.

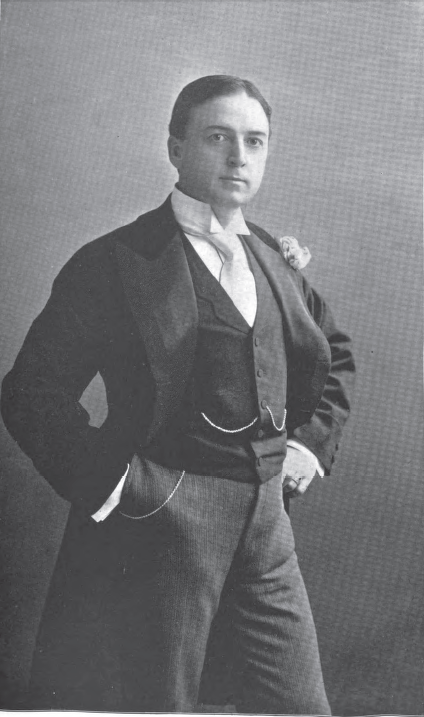
Actor Chauncey Olcott, c. 1896, photo by W. M. Morrison

In the early years of his career Olcott sang in minstrel shows, before studying singing in London during the 1880s. Lillian Russell played a major role in helping make him a Broadway star. When the producer Augustus Pitou approached him in 1893 to succeed William J. Scanlan as the leading tenor in sentimental operettas on Irish themes, Olcott accepted and performed pseudo-Irish roles for the remainder of his career.

Olcott combined the roles of tenor, actor, lyricist and composer in many productions. He wrote the complete scores to Irish musicals such as Sweet Inniscara (1897), A Romance of Athlone (1899), Garrett O'Magh (1901), and Old Limerick Town (1902). For other productions he collaborated with Ernest R. Ball and George Graff in works such as The Irish Artist (1894), Barry of Ballymore (1910), Macushla (1912), and The Isle o' Dreams (1913). There are some 20 such works between 1894 and 1920.

He was a good songwriter who captured the mood of his Irish-American audience by combining melodic and rhythmic phrases from traditional Irish music with melancholy sentiment. Some numbers from his musicals became popular, such as "My Wild Irish Rose" from A Romance of Athlone, "Mother Machree" from Barry of Ballymore, and "When Irish Eyes Are Smiling" from The Isle o' Dreams. Sometimes he used tunes from others, such as that of the title song from Macushla from Irish composer Dermot Macmurrough (pseudonym of Harold R. White) or "Too Ra Loo Ra Loo Ral" by James Royce Shannon for his production Shameen Dhu (1914).

In 1925, a serious illness forced him to retire, and he moved to Monte Carlo where he died of pernicious anemia in 1932. His body was brought home and interred in the Woodlawn Cemetery in The Bronx, New York City.

== Legacy ==
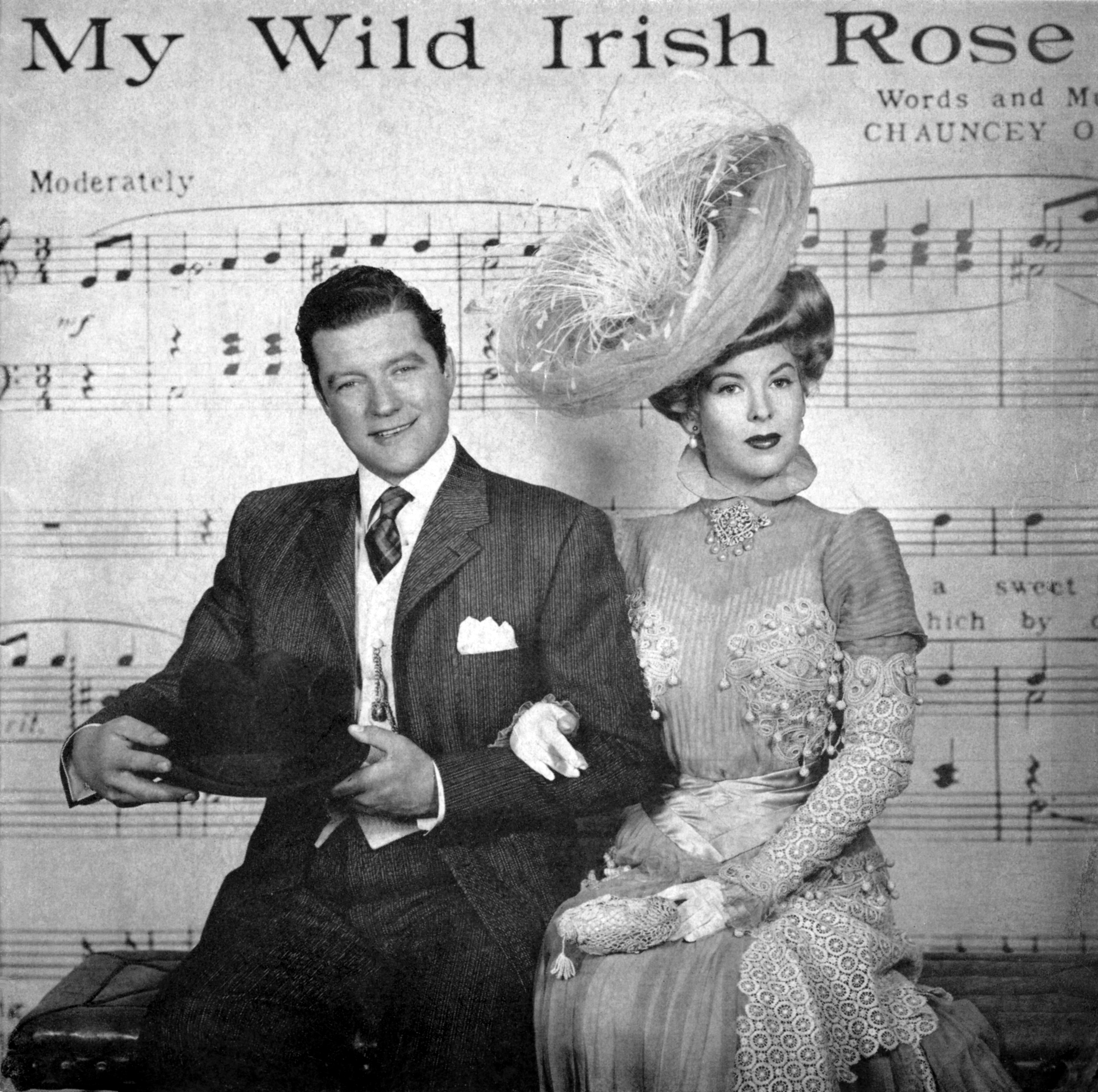
Dennis Morgan as Chauncey Olcott and Andrea King as Lillian Russell in My Wild Irish Rose (1947)

Olcott's life story was told in the 1947 Warner Bros. motion picture My Wild Irish Rose starring Dennis Morgan as Olcott. The film's plot was based on the biography by Olcott's widow, Rita Olcott, Song in His Heart (1939).

In 1970, Olcott was posthumously inducted into the Songwriters Hall of Fame.
