= Repasz Band =

American band

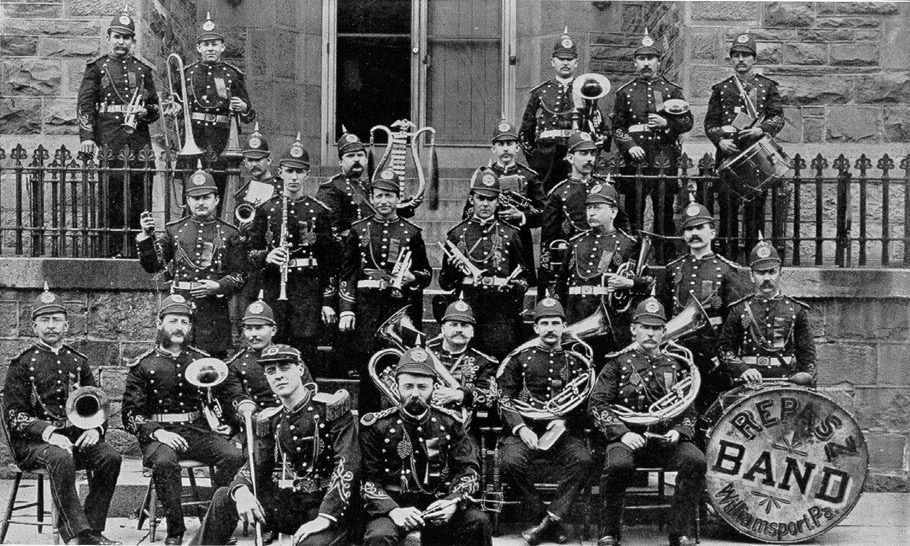
- Repasz Band in 1886
- Location: Williamsport, Pennsylvania
- Founded: 1831; 194 years ago
- Members: 75
- Website: repaszband.org

Pennsylvania Historical Marker
- Official name: Repasz Band (1831-present)
- Type: Roadside
- Designated: August 2, 2017

The Repasz Band is the longest continuously operated American band which has been active since 1831.

The band has played at many historic events which include; Robert E. Lee's surrender at the Battle of Appomattox Court House in 1865, the presidential inauguration parades of Teddy Roosevelt and William Howard Taft and the 1897 dedication of Ulysses S. Grant's tomb.

== History ==
The band was founded in 1831 in Williamsport, Pennsylvania and named it after director Daniel Repasz.

In April 1865 in the waning days of the Civil War with the news of a possible Confederacy surrender, the Repasz Band was invited to play at the event. On April 9, 1865 the band played at General Robert E. Lee’s surrender at Appomattox Courthouse. The band also played at the dedication of President Ulysses S. Grant’s Tomb in 1897 along with multiple presidential inauguration parades.

Repasz Band March performed by Conway's Band

In 1901 the band composed their world-famous “Repasz Band March.” Since it was first played in 1901, it has been played 4 to 5 million times and is considered on many charts to be among the 100 best marches ever written.

On August 2, 2017 the band was designated with a Pennsylvania State Historical Marker in Brandon Park in Williamsport.

== See also ==
- List of marching bands
- List of Pennsylvania state historical markers
