= Vandersloot Music Publishing Company =

Defunct American publisher of music

- Status: Defunct
- Founded: 1899; 126 years ago
- Founder: Frederick William Vandersloot, Jr. and Caird Melvill Vandersloot
- Successor: Jack Mills
- Country of origin: United States
- Headquarters location: Williamsport, Pennsylvania
- Publication types: Sheet music

Vandersloot Music Publishing Company was an American publisher of marches, waltzes, rags, religious music, and popular music of the Tin Pan Alley genre. The firm was founded in 1899 by Frederick William Vandersloot, Jr. (1866–1931) and his brother, Caird Melvill Vandersloot (born 1869). F. W. Vandersloot was a gospel singer, composer, and choir director. In 1913, the firm was based at 233 West 3rd Street, Williamsport, Pennsylvania with an office in New York at 41 W 18th Street, an area ten blocks directly south of what then became known as Tin Pan Alley.

For many years, Harry James Lincoln served as the composer and general manager of Vandersloot Music. Cora E. Vandersloot, née Elwert (1869–1944), wife of F. W. Vandersloot, had also served as president and manager. In 1929, Harry J. Lincoln acquired part of the Vandersloot Music Publishing Company and moved it to Philadelphia and operated it under the same name. When F. W. Vandersloot died in 1931, the firm dissolved, with much of the inventory being acquired by New York publisher Jack Mills.

Frank Hoyt Losey had been a composer and editor-in-chief for the Vandersloot Music Publishing Company.

== Vandersloot composers and lyricists ==
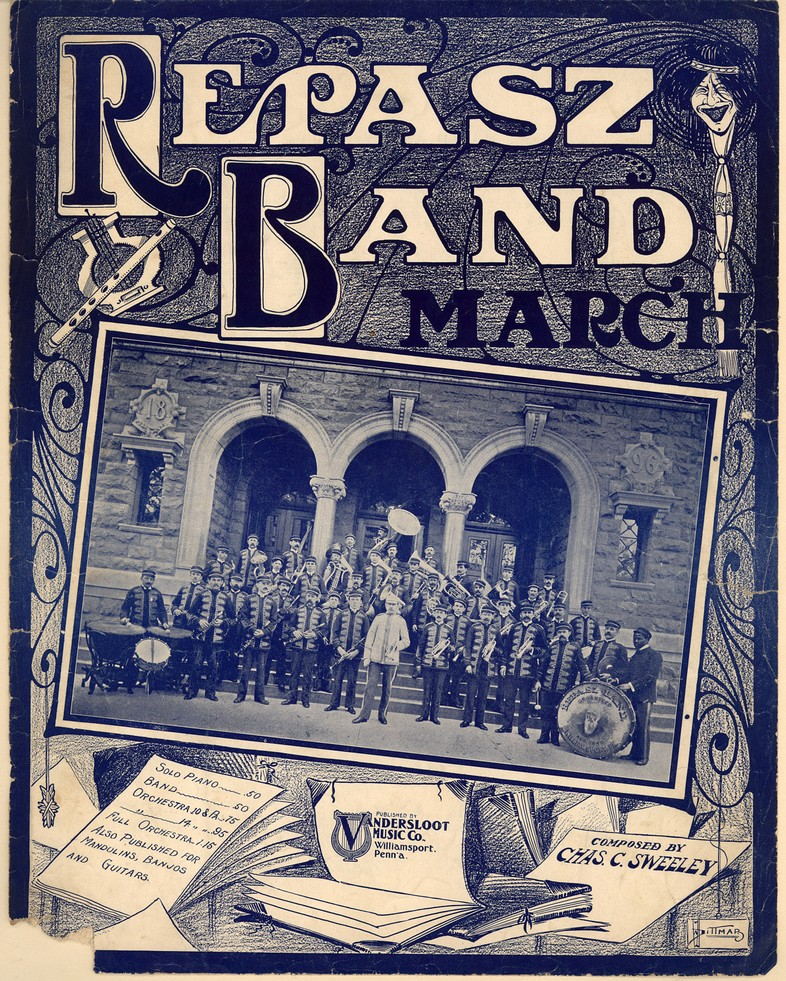
Repasz Band March by Charles C. Sweeley published by Vandersloot in 1904

- Carl Donaldson Vandersloot
- Charles Cohen (1878–1931), rag composer
- Robert Nathaniel Dett
- Charles E. Duble, circus band composer
- Raymond B. Egan, lyricist
- Stephen Foster
- Joseph E. Howard, lyricist
- Harry J. Lincoln (pseudonyms: Abe Losch, Carl Loveland, & Harry Jay)
- Frank Hoyt Losey
- Raymond A. Sherwood, lyricist
- Andrew B. Sterling, lyricist
- Charley Straight, jazz pianist

== Family ==
Frederick William Vandersloot, Jr., married Cora E. Vandersloot (née Elwert) on January 20, 1898. They had two sons and two daughters. One son and one daughter — Carl Donaldson Vandersloot (1898–1963) and Ruth Person Vandersloot (1904–1989) — both composed for Vandersloot Music. In 1920, Ruth married Author Taylor Eaker and composed under the pseudonym Ruth V. Hoyt, her surname borrowed from Vandersloot's editor-in-chief Frank Hoyt Losey.
