= Ernest Ball =

American songwriter

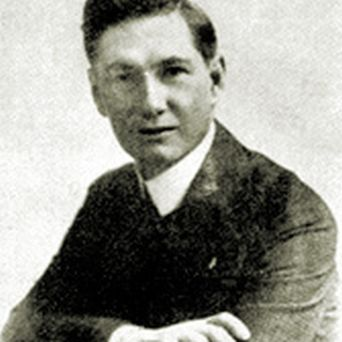
- Born: July 22, 1878; Cleveland, Ohio
- Died: May 3, 1927 (aged 48); Santa Ana, California
- Resting place: Lake View Cemetery
- Spouse: Jessie Mae Jewitt
- Relatives: Ernie Ball (grandson); Hannah Marks (great-great granddaughter)

Ernest Roland Ball (July 22, 1878 – May 3, 1927) was an American singer and songwriter, most famous for composing the music for the song "When Irish Eyes Are Smiling" in 1912. Ball was not Irish and neither were the lyricists.

== Early life and education ==
Born in Cleveland, Ohio, Ball received formal music training at the Cleveland Conservatory.

== Career ==
"I'll Forget You" by Ernest Ball. Sung by Allan Rogers. Released by Edison Records in 1921.

His growing career was much buoyed by James J. Walker, then a state senator of New York, who asked Ball to write music for some lyrics he wrote. Ball did, and the song "Will You Love Me In December as You Do In May?" became a hit. Walker later became known as "Beau James," mayor of New York City from 1926 to 1932; their collaboration was a fortunate event for Ball's career.

Ball accompanied singers, sang in vaudeville and wrote sentimental ballads, mostly with Irish themes. He collaborated with Chauncey Olcott on many songs including "When Irish Eyes are Smiling", for which Olcott wrote the lyrics. Ball wrote other Irish favorites like "Mother Machree", and "A Little Bit of Heaven", as well as "Dear Little Boy of Mine", and "Let the Rest of the World Go By." "Mother Machree" was made popular by the famous Irish tenor, John McCormack. He also worked with J. Keirn Brennan on songs like "For Dixie and Uncle Sam" and "Good Bye, Good Luck, God Bless You".

He became a charter member of ASCAP in 1907, and wrote many American standards. He was also a fine pianist, and his playing is preserved on several piano roll recordings he made for the Vocalstyle company, based in his home state of Ohio. He died just after walking off stage at the Yost Theater in Santa Ana, California while on tour with "Ernie Ball and His Gang", an act starring Ball and a male octet. Ball was interred at Lake View Cemetery in Cleveland, Ohio. Ball was posthumously inducted into the Songwriters Hall of Fame in 1970.

A 1944 musical Irish Eyes Are Smiling told the story of Ball's career and starred Dick Haymes and June Haver.

== Family ==
His grandson was the guitar string entrepreneur Ernie Ball, his great-grandson is singer-songwriter/content producer Sherwood Ernest Ball, and his great-great-granddaughters are actress Hannah Marks and singer/songwriter Tiare' Ball.
