= American march music =

Music genre

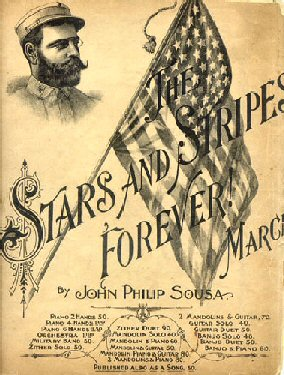
Sheet music cover for "The Stars and Stripes Forever March", written by John Philip Sousa

American march music is march music written and/or performed in the United States. Its origins are those of European composers borrowing from the military music of the Ottoman Empire in place there from the 16th century. The American genre developed after the British model during the colonial and Revolutionary periods, then later as military ceremonials and for civilian entertainment events.

One of the earliest exponents of march music in America and its preeminent champion was John Philip Sousa, "The March King"; who revolutionized and standardized American march music during the 19th and early 20th centuries. Some of his most famous marches—"Semper Fidelis", "The Washington Post", "The Liberty Bell March", and "The Stars and Stripes Forever"—are among the best known of historical American music and are especially revered by many Americans for their rousing strains and patriotic themes. His "Stars and Stripes Forever" features what is arguably the most famous piccolo obligato in all of music.

Other notable American composers of march music include Henry Fillmore – "The Circus Bee"; Charles A. Zimmerman – "Anchors Aweigh"; W. Paris Chambers – "Sweeney's Cavalcade"; Edwin E. Bagley – "National Emblem March"; Meredith Willson – "Seventy-six Trombones"; and George Gershwin – "Strike Up the Band". Composers (from Europe or elsewhere) of march music popular in the US include: Johann Strauss Sr – "Radetzky March"; Kenneth J. Alford – "Colonel Bogey March"; Julius Fucik – "Entry of the Gladiators"; Edward Elgar – "Pomp and Circumstance (No. 1)".

The forms of American march music typically are of three categories: the military march form, the regimental march form, and a general group containing recapitulation marches, "four-step" marches, and other diverse forms. All marches have at least three common elements, including: different (i.e., contrasting) sections called strains; several different melodies; and a "trio" section of strains/"repeats" that offers pronounced contrasts in phrasing. Most American marches use (seemingly) simple chord progressions, but—using chromatic harmonies, sevenths extensions, and secondary dominants—composers often complicated their marches with interesting chords and rapid chord changes.

== History ==
The true "march music era" succeeded in the United States from the 1850s to the 1920s, and persisted through the 1940s as it slowly became shadowed by the coming of jazz in the U.S. Earlier marches by Handel, Mozart, and Beethoven tended to be parts of symphonies or movements in suites. Despite its age and history and its popular performance in the U.S., European march music generally is not thought of as typically American music.

=== Marches and the military band ===
Radetzky March
Austrian Johann Strauss I's "Radetzky March" (1848), which became popular in the U.S.; arranged for the United States Marine Corps Band

The origins of European and American march music can be traced to the military music of the Ottoman Empire. The martial purposes of the music was to regulate army movements in the field by signalling orders, and to keep time during marching and maneuvers. The extensive use of percussion, especially cymbals, was also for psychological effect as, early on, their use was unknown in Western Europe and had the capacity to frighten opponents. (Indeed, the subsequent adoption of such percussive instruments in European 'classical' music was by direct import from the Ottomans.) Europeans were first exposed to march music in the early 18th century, and interest continued to build into the 1800s when a vogue for Turkish marching bands swept through Europe. Pieces displaying the Turkish influence can be found in the works of Mozart, Haydn, and Beethoven, with a notable example being "Turkish March" by Beethoven (part of Op. 113: Overture and incidental music for Die Ruinen von Athen).

It was apparently during the latter gunpowder age that military march music was developed for armies to support troop morale by marching with music playing, whether from the melody of a fife or the beat of a drum, or both. American march music developed during the American Revolution and earlier colonial conflicts, in which a fife and snare drum would play while troops marched to battle. Thus it is said that march music is a military music.

The tradition of formed lines of soldiers marching into battle with music playing ended soon after the American Civil War in the mid 19th century; military bands continued to perform marches during ceremonial events, which spawned a new tradition of playing marches as a source of entertainment.

=== Marches and the concert band ===
The Washington Post March
The United States Marine Band performs "The Washington Post", one of Sousa's most famous marches

During the late 19th and early 20th centuries, many U.S. towns, organizations, theaters, and even companies aspired to have their own band. These so-called community/concert bands performed at scheduled parades and concerts and played at impromptu events such as the popular gazebo concerts. Published marches were plentiful due to prolific American composers like John Philip Sousa, Karl L. King, and Henry Fillmore. Marches became a staple in the repertoire of these concert bands, explaining in part how the popularity of march music spread so rapidly across the country.

=== Marches and the circus ===
The Circus Bee
Henry Fillmore's "The Circus Bee", a circus band screamer performed by the United States Marine Corps Band

Marches were also popularized during this period by circus bands. The Ringling Brothers and Barnum & Bailey circuses presented their bands performing live march music. Typically, they played a special variety of marches known descriptively as screamers, two-steps, and cakewalks. These tunes served to energize the crowd and focus attention on the circus acts being performed.

=== Marches and the marching band ===
The march music era in the U.S. saw the development of college and high school marching bands, which typically were organized to perform march music during half-time shows and pep-rallies. Composers often dedicated marches to a favored university band.

== John Philip Sousa ==
The Stars and Stripes Forever March
The United States Marine Band performs "The Stars and Stripes Forever", the national march of the United States

American composer John Philip Sousa revolutionized American march music. His prolific production of quality marches greatly advanced the genre's popularity. According to researcher Paul Bierley, Sousa's marches were known for their simplicity and understatement with rousing counterpoint and overall energy.

Sousa standardized the military march form in America, see below. His marches are typically marked by a "subdued" trio—as in "The Stars and Stripes Forever", where most of the performing band becomes subordinated to arguably the most famous piccolo obligato in all of music. Sousa's magnum opus, "The Stars and Stripes Forever" was adopted in 1987 as the national march of the United States.

Sousa was prolific as both composer and orchestrator, writing 137 marches and more than 80 significant pieces, including operettas, overtures, suites, dances, and fantasies, and publishing some 322 arrangements of nineteenth-century western European symphonic works. He directed the design and production of his namesake instrument, the sousaphone, for its specialized adaption for use in a marching band. For its ease of carry and its forward-directed sound, the sousaphone is widely employed in marching bands and other musical venues.

== Notable march composers in the United States ==
Most march composers were from the United States or Europe. Publishing new march music was most popular during the late 19th and early 20th centuries; sponsors of the genre began to diminish after that time. Following is a list of march music composers whose marches are still performed in the United States.

- Russell Alexander (1877–1915)
- Kenneth Alford (1881–1945) "The British March King"
- Edwin Eugene Bagley (1857–1922)
- Hermann Louis Blankenburg (1876–1956)
- W. Paris Chambers (1854–1913)
- Charles E. Duble (1884–1960)
- Henry Fillmore (1881–1956) "The Trombone King"
- Julius Fucik (1872–1916) "The Czech March King"
- James M. Fulton (1873–1940) "Associated Press", "Waterbury American"
- Bernard Gilmore (1937–2013) "Five Folk Songs for Soprano and Band"
- Edwin Franko Goldman (1878–1956) "The American Bandmaster"
- Robert B. Hall (1858–1907) "The New England March King"
- John Clifford Heed (1864–1908)
- Arthur W. Hughes (ca.1870-ca.1950)
- Fred Jewell (1875–1936) "The Indiana March King"
- Karl L. King (1891–1971) "Iowa's Own Music Man", "The Circus Music King"
- John N. Klohr (1869–1956)
- Alex F. Lithgow (1870–1923) "Invercargill"
- Frank H. Losey (1872–1931) "The Pennsylvania March King"
- J. J. Richards (1878–1956) "The Long Beach March King"
- William Rimmer (1862–1936)
- Roland F. Seitz (1867–1946) "The Parade Music Prince"
- George Dallas Sherman (1844–1927) Composer of "Salute to Burlington"
- John Philip Sousa (1854–1932) "The March King"
- Carl Albert Hermann Teike (1864–1922)
- John Williams (1932–present)

== Famous marches ==
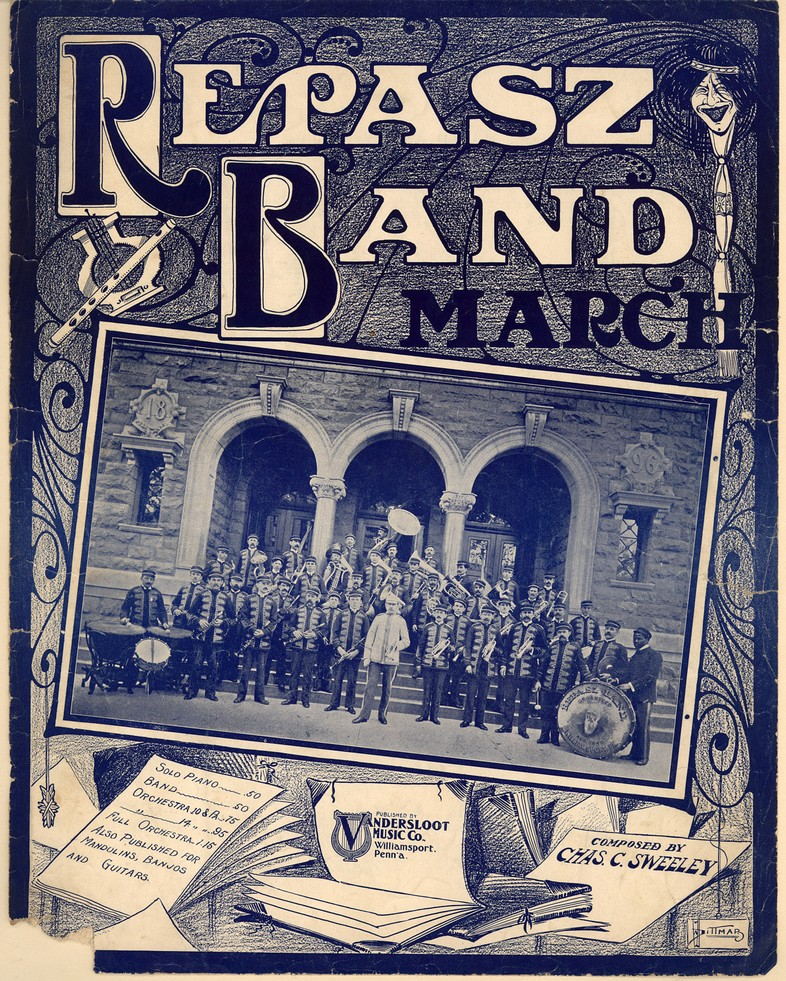
"Repasz Band March" by Chas. C. Sweeley

Following is a list of marches popular world-wide and frequently performed in the United States; in alphabetical order.

- "All Sports March" – Robert Farnon
- "American Patrol" (1885) – W. Frank Meacham
- "Americans We" (1929) – Henry Fillmore
- "Amparito Roca" (1925)– Jaime Teixidor
- "Anchors Aweigh" – Charles A. Zimmerman
- "Band of America" – Paul Lavalle
- "Bandology" – Eric Osterling
- "Barnum and Bailey's Favorite" (1913) – Karl L. King
- "Belgian Paratroopers (Marche des Parachutistes Belges)" – Pierre Leemans
- "The Big Cage" (1934) – Karl L. King
- "The Black Horse Troop" (1924) - John Philip Sousa
- "Black Jack March" – Fred K. Huffer
- "Blaze Away!" – Abe Holzmann
- "The Billboard" – John N. Klohr
- "Bombasto" – Orion R. Farrar
- "Boston Commandery March" – Thomas M. Carter
- "Bravura" – Charles E. Duble
- "Brighton Beach" – William Latham
- "Brooke's Chicago Marine Band" – Roland F. Seitz
- "Captain America March" – Alan Silvestri
- "The Chicago Tribune March" – W. Paris Chambers
- "The Chimes of Liberty" – Edwin F. Goldman
- "Coat of Arms" – George Kenny
- "Colossus of Columbia" – Russell Alexander
- "Colonel Bogey March" – Kenneth J. Alford
- "Combination March" – Scott Joplin
- "Commando March" – Samuel Barber
- "Coronation March" from Le Prophète – Giacomo Meyerbeer
- "Country Band March" (1903) - Charles Ives
- "Crusade for Freedom" – J.J. Richards
- "Children of the Shrine" – James Swearingen
- "E Pluribus Unum" – Fred Jewell
- "El Capitan" – John Philip Sousa
- "Emblem of Unity" – J.J. Richards
- "Entry of the Gladiators" (Thunder and Blazes) (1897) – Julius Fučík
- "Fairest of the Fair" – John Philip Sousa
- "Father of Victory (Le père la victoire)" – Louis Ganne
- "The Florentiner March" – Julius Fučík
- "The Footlifter" – Henry Fillmore
- "George Washington Bicentennial March" – John Philip Sousa
- "The Gallant Seventh" – John Philip Sousa
- "Guadalcanal March" – Richard Rodgers
- "Hail to the Chief" – James Sanderson
- "Hail, America" – George Drumm
- "Hail, Columbia" – Philip Phile
- "Hands Across the Sea" (1899) – John Philip Sousa
- "High School Cadets-March" – John Philip Sousa
- "The Imperial March" – John Williams
- "In Storm and Sunshine" – John C. Heed
- "Independentia March" – Robert Browne Hall
- "Invincible Eagle" – John Philip Sousa
- "Invercargill March" (1909)- Alex F. Lithgow
- "Joyce's 71st New York Regiment March" – Thornton Barnes Boyer
- "The Klaxon" (1929) – Henry Fillmore
- "Königgrätzer Marsch" – Johann Gottfried Piefke
- "The Liberty Bell" (1893) (Used as score for "Monty Python's Flying Circus") – John Philip Sousa
- "The March from 1941" – John Williams
- "March from A Little Suite" – Trevor Duncan
- "The March from Stripes" – Elmer Bernstein
- "March Grandioso" – Roland F. Seitz
- "Marines' Hymn – Jacques Offenbach
- "The Melody Shop" – Karl L. King
- "Men of Ohio" – Henry Fillmore
- "The Men of the Yorktown March" – John Williams
- "Midway March" – John Williams
- "Military Escort" – Henry Fillmore
- "Miss Liberty March" – Karl L. King
- "National Emblem" – Edwin Eugene Bagley
- "The New Colonial March" – Robert Browne Hall
- "Officer of the Day March" – Robert Browne Hall
- "Official West Point March" – Philip Egner
- "On Parade" – Edwin Franko Goldman
- "On the Mall" – Edwin Franko Goldman
- "Onward and Upward" – Edwin Franko Goldman
- "On the Square" – Frank Panella
- "On the Quarter Deck" – Kenneth J. Alford
- "Old Comrades (Alte Kameraden)" (1899) – Carl Teike
- "Our Director" – F.E. Bigelow
- "The Pathfinder of Panama" – John Philip Sousa
- "Pomp and Circumstance, No. 1" – Edward Elgar
- "Pops on the March" – John Williams
- "Preußens Gloria" ("Prussia's Glory") – Johann Gottfried Piefke
- "The Last Long Mile" ("Plattsburg Marching Song") – Emil Breitenfeld
- "The Purple Carnival" – Harry L. Alford
- "The Purple Pageant" – Karl L. King
- "The Raiders March" – John Williams
- "Radetzky March" – Johann Strauss Sr.
- "Repasz Band" – Chas. C. Sweeley
- "Robinson's Grand Entree" – Karl L. King
- "Salutation" – Roland F. Seitz
- "Semper Fidelis" – John Philip Sousa
- "Semper Paratus" – Francis Saltus Van Boskerck
- "The Screamer" – Fred Jewell
- "Second Connecticut Regiment " – D.W. Reeves
- "Seventy-Six Trombones" – Meredith Willson
- "The Southerner" – Russell Alexander
- "The Stars and Stripes Forever" (1896) – John Philip Sousa
- "Strike Up the Band" (1927) – George Gershwin
- "Superman March" – John Williams
- "Sweeney's Cavalcade" – W. Paris Chambers
- "The Tenth Regiment March (Death or Glory)" – Robert Browne Hall
- "The Thunderer" – John Philip Sousa
- "Under the Double Eagle (Unter dem Doppeladler)" (1902) – Josef F. Wagner
- "The U.S. Air Force" – Robert MacArthur Crawford
- "Up the Street" – Robert G. Morse
- "Washington Grays March" (1861) – Claudio S. Grafulla
- "The Washington Post" – John Philip Sousa, composed 1889
- "The White Rose" – John Philip Sousa
- "You're a Grand Old Flag" – George M. Cohan

== Musicality and the march music form ==
This section discusses the format and other musical aspects of march music.

=== Meter ===
The majority of marches are written in duple meter, meaning they have two beats per measure (or two beats "to the bar"). Only a few marches are written otherwise (usually in 4/4 time), while still using the same two beats per measure tempo (see below).

Several meters are used in marches, as follows:

- 2/2 time is called "cut-time", indicated by the symbol. (This means common time cut-in-half, hence the name "cut-time"). Marches written in cut-time have a clear upbeat/downbeat feel, which in layman's terms, means a strong "oom-pah" sound is heard. Many cut-time marches use heavy syncopation to create rhythmic interest. Because passing tones in most cases are shorter than marches in a different meter, cut-time marches tend to sound faster. An example of a cut-time march is "Stars and Stripes Forever" by Sousa.
- 6/8 time marches are played "in two", meaning the dotted quarter-note gets the beat and there are two of them in a measure. 6/8 time is used when the composer wants a "triplet" feel in the beat; that is, 6/8 marches produce a more dance-like, swing beat that is more prominent and exaggerated than its cut-time cousin. A 6/8 march can be recognized immediately by its common "da-bah-da-bah" or "DA-da-DA-da" sound. An example of a 6/8 march is "The Washington Post March", also by Sousa.
- 2/4 time is much like cut-time, except fewer notes appear in a measure, as here the quarter-note gets the beat instead of the half-note; but there are still only two beats per measure. Marches in 2/4 time typically are written for the performer as it is easier to read at faster tempos. Many European marches are written in 2/4, and almost all American galops as well. Galops are played at a very fast tempo, sounding as if there was one beat to the bar.
- 4/4 time marches are rare. However, some slow marches such as dirges use it. Robert Jager uses 4/4 in his quick march "Stars and Bars".

=== Tempo ===
The tempo of marches varies significantly. While most bands perform marches in their own tempo, most marches are quick (faster than a waltz, as fast as or slower than a polka). As alluded to before, most march composers did not designate a specific tempo on their manuscripts. However, that is not to say the march music composer is random with his/her tempo while conducting the march. For example, John Philip Sousa conducted his marches using around 120 beats per minute. Most European march composers, however, conducted their marches in a slower style, using around 100 beats per minute. There are, however, many and notable exceptions: see concert march and screamer.

=== March music forms ===
Most marches follow a fairly strict structure known as the march music form, the origins of which appear to be derived from the sonata form, as these two forms share similar ideas of contrasting sections. The period of early development of the true march music form denotes the start of the march music era in the US by the 1850s; eventually the form was standardized by John Philip Sousa. While the form varies among different styles of march music, all marches have these common elements:

- Different sections, called strains.
- Several separate melodies.
- A middle section, dubbed the Trio, that features contrasting melodic material and is usually lighter in texture and more lyrical in style. After the Trio the main section is recapitulated.

Following are descriptions of various march forms that have been popular and are/were frequently used by march music composers.

==== Military march form ====
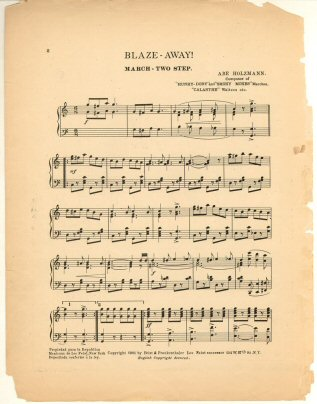
"Blaze Away! March" by Abe Holzmann, written in military march format

The military march form is largely credited to John Philip Sousa, who came to be known as "The March King". He standardized the "military" form (as compared to the "regimental" form), using it in over half of his marches.

The military march form is: I-AA-BB-C(C)-Br-C-Br-C(Grandioso); or, in more generic code: I-AA-BB-CCDCDC.

The Thunderer introduction
John Philip Sousa's "The Thunderer", introduction

The first section of a military march is called the introduction (I) or fanfare; it is typically 4, 8, or 16 bars long and played in marcato style, using forte (loud) dynamics and chromatic alterations to catch the attention of the listener. The introduction is usually the shortest section of a march and is almost never omitted. Still, examples of marches written without an intro include "Bugles and Drums" and "The Footlifter".

Introductions to marches vary but some standard practices include: (a) tutti unison ("The Washington Post"), (b) tutti rhythmic unison with contrary motion ("The Thunderer"), (c) tutti rhythm unison in four-part harmony ("Semper Fi"), and (d) four-part independent ("The Klaxon"). The introduction is commonly based on the dominant key to create clarity of key as centered in the first strain, (see harmonic progressions below). Generally, the intro is not repeated, but it is in some marches: "Bravura", "The Rifle Regiment", and "Washington Grays". The introduction generally starts in major because marches typically are in major keys, but there are marches with introductions in minor keys, including "Gladiator", "The Picadore", "Nobles of the Mystic Shrine", and "Rolling Thunder".

The Thunderer first strain
First strain of "The Thunderer"

The next section is commonly called the first strain, as it is the first prominent melody of the march. The first strain is typically 8 or 16 bars long with 4-measure phrases. The first strain can be in either major or minor mode and can use any variety of dynamics, instrumentation and modulations. Typically this strain utilizes similar motifs (as opposed to contrasting motifs—see trio, below) in its phrasing, and it sounds more rhythmically straightforward than the following section.

After the first playing of the strain, it is repeated once, sometimes with added parts such as counter-melodies. The first strain may be repeated yet again after the second strains, particularly if it (first strain) is in minor. Karl L. King frequently arranged this style, as did Henry Fillmore with his trombone smears. Examples include "Peacemaker March", "New York Hippodrome", "Caravan Club March", "Trombone King", "Lassus Trombone", "Royal Decree", and Price's "March of Youth".

The Thunderer second strain
Second strain of "The Thunderer"

The second strain is usually 16 bars long and is the second primary melody of the march. However, in marches like "Solid Men to the Front", and Sousa's Untitled March, the second strain is 32 bars in length. Some marches commonly play the first run of the second strain quietly and the second run loudly; these include: "The Stars and Stripes Forever", "His Honor", "The Washington Post", "Hands Across the Sea", "On the Mall", and others, particularly by Sousa.

The second strain may use somewhat different instrumentation or may alter the relative dynamics of the different parts. The melody is normally played with the basses, i.e., the low brass and low woodwinds). This strain typically uses 4-measure phrases, but with greatly varied motifs, which causes the melodies to sound more "stretched out". For example, many marches use more whole notes in the second strain than the first—as can be heard in "The Stars and Stripes Forever". Like the first, the second strain is usually repeated once, sometimes twice; but some marches, including "Emblem of Freedom", "Cyrus the Great" and the "Melody Shop", omit this repeat.

The Thunderer trio
"The Thunderer" trio

In some marches, a short introduction to the trio is heard, often a repeat of the opening introduction, or it may be a different melody played by the whole band, a fanfare by the brasses—or a percussion soli (drum roll-off) as heard in "Semper Fidelis" by Sousa. Another example of a trio introduction is found in "Twin Eagle Strut" by Zane Van Auken.

The third (or technically fourth or fifth) primary melody in a march is called the trio, which usually is the main melody of the march. It typically is played legato style in a softer dynamic and features woodwinds more than brass. Sousa often used clarinets and euphoniums in lower tenor register in his trios. This trio strain is the most contrasting of the sections, often containing variations of motifs heard in the previous two strains.

The trio melody may be repeated once at a softer dynamic, or may not be repeated at all. Typically, it is played quietly for the first or second playthrough, then features piccolos (or flutes, or other woodwinds) playing over the trio melody. In almost all cases the trio now modulates to the subdominant key of the march, meaning one flat is added to the key signature. The key is now flatter and this repeat will, with softer instrumentation, offer a relaxing feel from the previous volume. The contrast makes the trio more memorable as the new key is maintained to the end of the strain. (For marches starting in minor keys, the trio usually modulates to the relative major.)

Next comes the breakstrain or breakup strain (sometimes called the dogfight or interlude), making it the fourth melody heard. This strain is loud, intense, and marcato. Its purpose can be found in its title, as it literally breaks a gap between the trio sections, providing contrast to the usually softer trio melodies and generating excitement for the listener. Most breakstrains resemble a conversation between the upper woodwinds and the low brass. The final measures typically contain tension-building chords or chromatic motifs.

The breakstrain is usually 16 bars long, as in the case of "Hands Across the Sea", but marches vary: "The Washington Post" and "The Interlochen Bowl" have eight-bar breakstrains, where "On the Mall" and "The Purple Pageant" have 12-bar, and "The Thunderer" has a 15-bar breakstrain. "The Stars and Stripes Forever" has a 24-bar breakstrain.

The Thunderer breakstrain and trio grandioso (Trio)
The rest of "The Thunderer"

The Thunderer
Full midi of "The Thunderer" by John Philip Sousa

After the breakstrain, the trio is usually repeated again, but sometimes the march goes straight to the final trio, as in "U.S. Field Artillery March" (the "Caisson Song") by John Philip Sousa; most of Goldman's marches in the military form also did this, with the trio only being played twice and the breakstrain once. The trio after the breakstrain (when it is not the final trio) is usually played in the same style as the first, but sometimes counter-melodies or obbligatos are added to these latter runs of the trio. Now the breakstrain is played again and the march moves to the final trio.

The final trio is known as the grandioso, trio grandioso or trio, which typically, as the grand finale, is played through much more loudly than previous runs of the trio. It sometimes adds yet another counter-melody or obligato (such as the one in "The Stars and Stripes Forever") and uses all instrumental sections of the band, bringing everything to a close. The grandioso is the most exciting section of the march; its role is to make the trio melody memorable to the listener.

The last measure of the march sometimes contains a stinger, a I chord played in unison on the downbeat after a quarter rest. Most, but not all, marches carry a stinger. "Semper Fidelis" is a famous march that does not have an ending stinger when not recapitulated back to the beginning of the march (see below). Most marches end at forte volume (loud); one that does not is Sousa's "Manhattan Beach", which ends fading away.

Examples of military marches include "The Stars and Stripes Forever" by John Philip Sousa, "Barnum and Bailey's Favorite" by Karl L. King, and "On the Mall" by Edwin F. Goldman

==== Regimental march form ====
The regimental march form as developed in the US is perhaps older than the military form; it is also called the "review march". There are some key differences between the two styles.

The regimental march form is: I-AA-BB-CC-DD

The introduction, first strain, and second strain are typically that of a military march, but some use a longer (or much longer) introduction.

After the trio the regimental march follows with a strain (D) instead of a breakstrain. This new strain also uses a modulated key and typically relates to the second strain; it is almost always repeated once.

The regimental march is considerably shorter than a military march for lack of a third repeat of the trio and breakstrain; thus, it is preferred for performances by marching bands in parades—hence the name "review march".

Examples of regimental marches include Sousa's "Semper Fidelis" (when not recapitulated back to the beginning of the march – see below), "Men of Ohio" by Henry Fillmore, "Bugles and Drums" by Goldman, and "Robinson's Grand Entry" by Karl L. King.

==== Other forms and styles ====
Some earlier marches presented a simple, "four-part", form: I-AA-BB-CC.

Typically those marches, having neither a breakstrain nor 'D' section, were written for marching bands or youth bands. The piece was ended by simply playing one repeat of the trio, usually in the grandioso style. Examples include "Our Director" by F.E. Bigelow and "Gallant Marines" by Karl L. King. Henry Fillmore and Karl King often used the four-part style in their marches. Sousa rarely used this style.

Sousa's marches of the early 1890s (including "High School Cadets" and "Manhattan Beach"), used an introduction unique to his career.

Many earlier American and European marches, using either the four-part or the regimental form, recapitulate back to the beginning of the march. Typically, after completing the final trio (or 'D' section), the march is re-started; repeats are ignored, and the piece is ended after the second strain. Codas are rare, but sometimes used; examples: "Riders for the Flag" by Sousa and "Children of the Shrine" by James Swearingen.

The tradition of writing recapitulating marches ended near the start of the American march music era. John Philip Sousa abandoned this technique except with his march "On Parade"—one of his few circus marches. Victor Herbert was one of the last American composers to write recapitulating marches. Examples include "Under the Double Eagle" by Wagner and "The Serenade" by Victor Herbert.

=== Phrasing ===
The basic (and vague) definition of a march describes a piece of music based upon a regular, repeated drum or rhythmic pattern—which means a march is most recognizable by its phrasing. Almost all quickstep marches consist of four-measure, or four-bar, phrases typically ending with a whole note (that either creates or resolves melodic tension, see chord progression), followed by a pickup note. Thus it is said that this "basic" framework is what makes marches melodically "pleasing".

Some marches have more noticeable phrases than others. Marches by Karl King have very clear-cut phrases with distinctive whole notes and pickups. In contrast, John Philip Sousa used practically seamless phrasing.

=== Chords and harmonic progression ===
The harmonic progressions of American march music are well-grounded in the archetypal harmonic techniques of the times in which they were written. In summary, most American marches use seemingly simple chord progressions for the sake of creating a melodically pleasing sound, however composers often complemented their marches with interesting chords and rapid chord changes—using chromatic harmonies, sevenths extensions, and secondary dominants.

A detailed discussion of chord progressions follows. (Recommended reading in conjunction with these details: Chord progression and Scale degree.)

Here is code for the chord progressions of the first strain of "Semper Fidelis" by John Philip Sousa. Note, each bar pair (e.g., |G7|), represents one of a total of 16 measures.

- |G7| |G7| |C| |C| |G7| |G7| |C| |C| |G7| |G7||C| |C|G7/B| |G| |G| |D7||G7|

The first strain begins with a very simple V-I progression (see chord progression basics), creating a wave-like sense of tension and relief within the chord. The use of dominant seven chords makes the V chord stronger and is used in many marches. In the middle of the measure, before the trumpet "fanfare", the chord alters to C♯dim7 instead of remaining on C. This leads to a G7 chord (rather than to a D minor chord), and is an example of a common-tone diminished seventh chord. This chord leads into the V chord (G), then to a D7 chord. Here a D chord in the key of C would be the ii chord (as all ii chords must be minor). But the D chord here is not minor. Rather, it is known as a "secondary dominant", i.e., a dominant chord borrowed from different key. (A secondary dominant naturally leads into a chord other than the first (or I chord); here it leads into the V (G7)).

Here is code for chord progressions of the second strain.

- |C| |F|G7| |C| |C| |G7| |G7| |C| |C|G7| |C| |F|E7| |Am| |A♭7| |C| |C| |G| |C|

As with most second strains of march music, rapidly changing chords are featured: a legacy of Sousa. The IV chord is used here in marches to create an "uplifting" and lyrical sound which tends either to resolve back to the I chord—or to proceed into the V chord, as it does here. At the tenth measure, (|F|E7|), which restates the main theme, Sousa uses a "deceptive" chord change. Instead of using F to G7 to C (as in measures two and three), the chord goes from the IV (F) to V7/VI (i.e., E7), to the VI (Am). The main melodic theme uses the same notes, but revolves around a different harmonic progression. Sousa then uses his trademark chromatic-accented chord A♭7, (a half-step below the previous chord) to create a "wall of tension" that quickly resolves into the I chord.

Another chromatic-accented chord change often used by march music composers is inverting a I chord with a lowered third and raised fifth. For example, an E♭ major chord (the I in the key of E♭) would be followed by a B major chord (which is an E♭ chord with a lowered third and raised fifth). Unlike secondary or "borrowed" dominants, this chord does not have logical harmonic functions other than to add texture and interest.

== Difficulty of performance ==
The actual difficulty of performance varies considerably among marches. When first being written for grade school bands then being organized throughout the country, most marches were fairly modest in difficulty. Soon however, there were composers writing scores for (their own) bands that required professional to almost virtuosic skill to perform—some composers noting that any given march might be difficult to play "perfectly", that is, with all the correct expressions and articulations and with steady tempo. A grading system of difficulty of performance as adapted from Norman Smith's "March Music Notes" follows.

- Grade 1: Minimum difficulty. Suited for beginner bands first approaching music; may be a simple etude or ditty from an instructional book.
- Grade 2: Also for beginner bands, but more developed, using different notes and rhythms. Instrumental ranges are comfortable, most requiring minimal endurance. Some scores follow the standard march form, but most are abbreviated, or of a simpler concert march form.
- Grade 3: At standard march difficulty. Usually in full march form, and requiring moderate technique and endurance skills. Instrumental ranges are usually intermediate, and likely containing chromatic notes, obbligatos, and counter-melodies. Many parade marches contain Grade 3 scoring, examples being "The Thunderer" and "The National Emblem".
- Grade 4: Moderately difficult, containing many technically challenging parts and some syncopation. This grade requires a considerable amount of practice/rehearsal of most high school bands; and typically requires a disciplined, complete ensemble for proper performance, as it contains intricate harmonies and counter-melodies. Example scores of this difficulty are "The Stars and Stripes Forever" and "Barnum and Bailey's Favorite".
- Grade 5: Considerably difficult; usually originally written for professional or virtuoso players such as those in a circus band, as screamers are typical of this grade. Grade 5s contain woodwind obbligatos or chromatic runs and will test the range of any player; they have very quick tempos, as well as complicated rhythms and syncopation. Example marches are "Entry of the Gladiators", "Washington Grays", and "Battle of Shiloh".
- Grade 6: A rare difficulty. Usually found in greater works such as a symphonies, which typically contain mixed meters and intricate rhythms and harmonies.

== Instrumentation ==
A 'correct' general description of the original instrumentation of (American) march bands is unlikely, as these bands were extremely varied through the 19th and early 20th centuries and most march music was written by composers for their own bands. Thus, almost all bands accumulated marches in repertoire that were written for their specific instrumentation.

On the other hand, marches were also written for specific instrumentation to be determined "locally". That is, composers simply wrote a piano version of a march which was given to the publisher to arrange the different parts for concert or marching band, or orchestra, etc.

Still, modern repertoire and arrangements are typically scored for:

- Piccolo
- Flute 1, 2
- Oboe 1, 2
- (English Horn)
- Bassoon 1, 2
- (Contrabassoon)
- (E♭ Clarinet)
- B♭ Clarinet 1, 2, 3
- (E♭ Alto Clarinet)
- B♭ Bass Clarinet
- (B♭ Contrabass Clarinet)
- E♭ Alto Saxophone 1, 2
- B♭ Tenor Saxophone
- E♭ Baritone Saxophone
- (B♭ Bass Saxophone)
- B♭ Trumpet 1, 2, 3
- (B♭ Cornet) 1, 2, 3
- F Horn 1, 2, 3, 4
- Trombone 1, 2
- Bass Trombone
- Euphonium
- Tuba
- String Bass
- Timpani
- Bass Drum
- Cymbals
- Snare Drum
- (Triangle)
- (Tambourine)
- (Glockenspiel)
- (Harp)

=== Assignments and roles of instrument sections ===
Generally, the several instrument sections of an American march band serve the various roles of performing a typical march as follows:

- Trumpets and cornets almost always carry the melody. They also may be scored various "flourishes" and "calls" for effect.
- Clarinets, flutes, and piccolos also carry the melody, and are assigned obbligatos and other integral lines.
- The tubas and other basses usually carry the bassline, providing the "oom" of the "oom-pah" sound of cut time marches (see French horns, below); they also provide the tonal foundation of the march, and assist to control volume and tempo.
- French horns almost always carry the rhythmic backup of a march. For example, in cut time marches, they are typically assigned upbeats to provide the "pah" for the stylistic "oom-pah" sound. In 6/8 marches, French horns play on: beat 1, the li of 1, beat 2, and the li of 2, (or, 1–la–li–2–la–li, see solmization); thus, the measure is one eighth note, then an eighth rest, then two eighth notes, an eighth rest, then a final eighth note.
- The euphonium often carries the melody, as in the trio of "The Stars and Stripes Forever", and may be assigned other roles.
