= Circus music =

Music genre

Entry of the Gladiators
Julius Fučík's "Entry of the Gladiators" performed by the United States Marine Band

The Circus Bee
Fillmore's "The Circus Bee" performed by the United States Marine Band

Rolling Thunder
Fillmore's "Rolling Thunder" performed by the Ceremonial Brass of the United States Air Force

Circus music (also known as carnival music) is any sort of music that is played to accompany a circus, and also music that emulates its general style. Circus bands would also often play popular music, as well as waltzes, foxtrots, and other dances.

== Origins ==
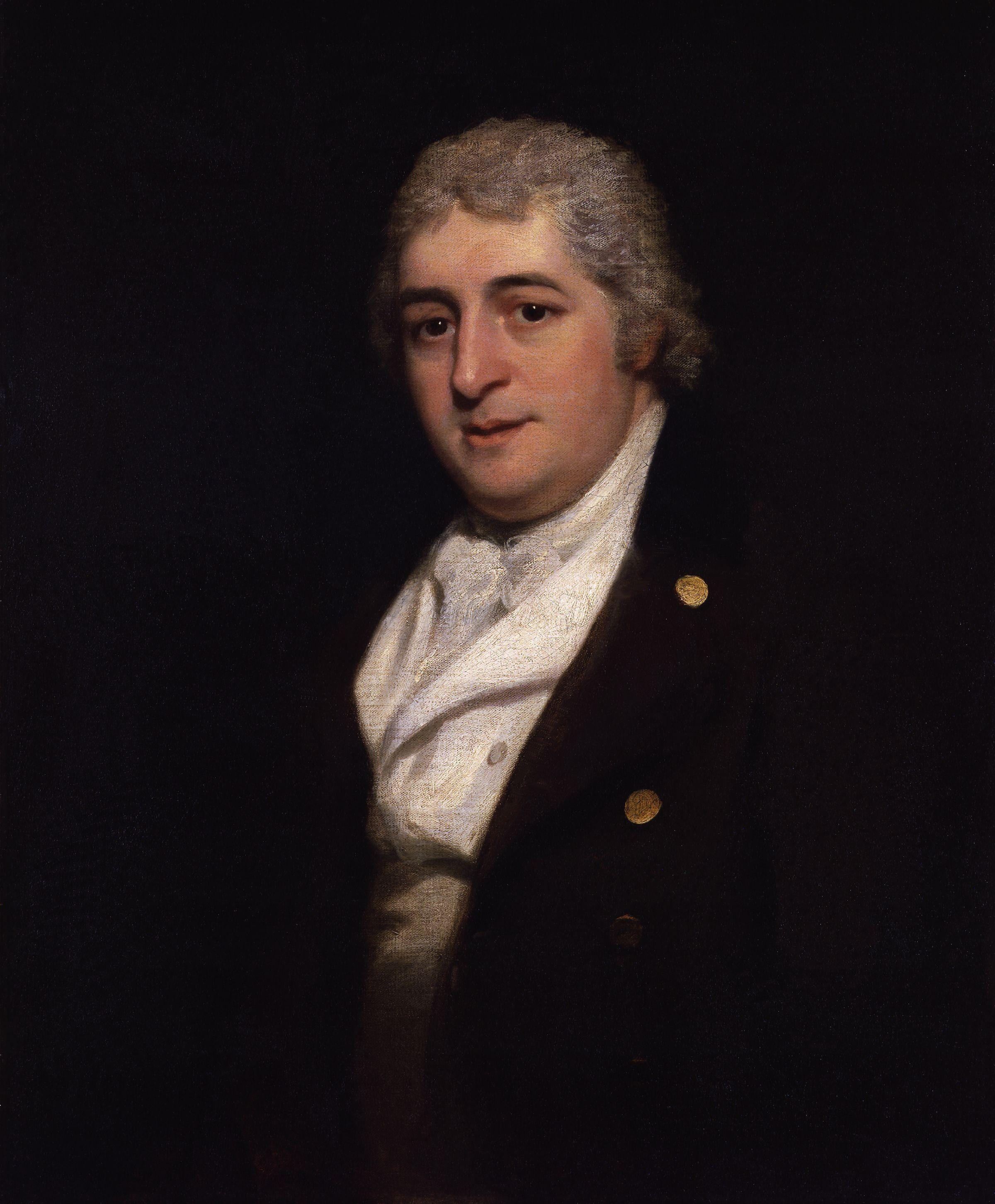
Charles Dibdin, first known composer of circus music

Although circuses have been in existence since the time of the ancient Romans, circus music first started as a performance by a fiddler or a flutist. It was not until the twentieth century that circus music was performed by big bands.

The first modern circus director and performer was Philip Astley (1742–1814), a veteran of the Seven Years' War and a skilled equestrian. With his horsemanship skills and the addition of jugglers, acrobats, and clowns, Astley opened Paris's first circus in 1782.

The first known composer of circus music was Charles Dibdin (1745–1814). He was partners with Astley and he also financed the theatre used for the royal circus. Dibdin was a very well known composer in his time and had written hundreds of works before he decided to join Astley to work for the circus. He wrote all of the pieces used in the circus, which were mostly intermezzos or comedy pieces. An ensemble of approximately sixty children was used as singers and dancers to perform the many pieces that he wrote for the circus, such as "The Graces", "Clump and Cudden", and "Pandora", which was arguably the most famous piece that was used in the circus because it was originally used in a popular puppet show that mocked contemporary figures of the time.

== Composition and usage ==
=== Circus marches and screamers ===
The most common type of circus music is the circus march, or screamer. It is characterized by a rapid-fire tempo – usually around 200 beats per minute – and melodies that contain showy features such as leaps, runs, and fanfares. It is difficult for musicians to play because of its fast tempo.

Marches served many purposes throughout the course of a circus. They were often used for grand entrances and exits, overtures and finales, acts featuring wild animals, or other daredevil-type acts. Circus marches are divided into "strains":

- Exposition – first section containing two strains, often with a preceding introduction
- Trio – second section; it can be composed of two different melodies that repeat, or one long melody that repeats itself
- Break strain, or "dogfight" – often follow the trio and bring back some of the exposition melody.

Xylophone-Solo in Souvenir de Cirque Renz by Gustav Peter

=== Galops ===
The galop is another popular form of circus music. Like the march, it is played at a fast, lively tempo and is primarily used for daredevil acts, such as trick-riding or other wild animal performances. Any performance or act that consisted of fast-paced tricks or stunts would probably have performed to a galop. The galop is typically written in 2/4 time and has a short length, but would only end when the ringmaster signaled the end of an act. If the act went longer, the galop could be extended by playing da capo. One of the best-known examples is Gustav Peter's widely popular Memory of Circus Renz, which was published in 1894 with the title Souvenir de Cirque Renz. The piece was originally written for the xylophone.

=== Choreography, notable compositions and composers ===
Circus music catered to the needs of the different acts. For example, a high-flying, nimble trapeze act could be characterized by a dizzying galop or a graceful waltz. An act containing ferocious wild animals, such as lions, would probably use a march.

"Sobre las Olas", or "Over the Waves", is a popular waltz used during trapeze shows, written by Mexican composer Juventino Rosas.

One piece that was never normally played was John Philip Sousa's "Stars and Stripes Forever". Instead, it was used in emergencies, such as animals getting loose, to help signify to workers that something was wrong.

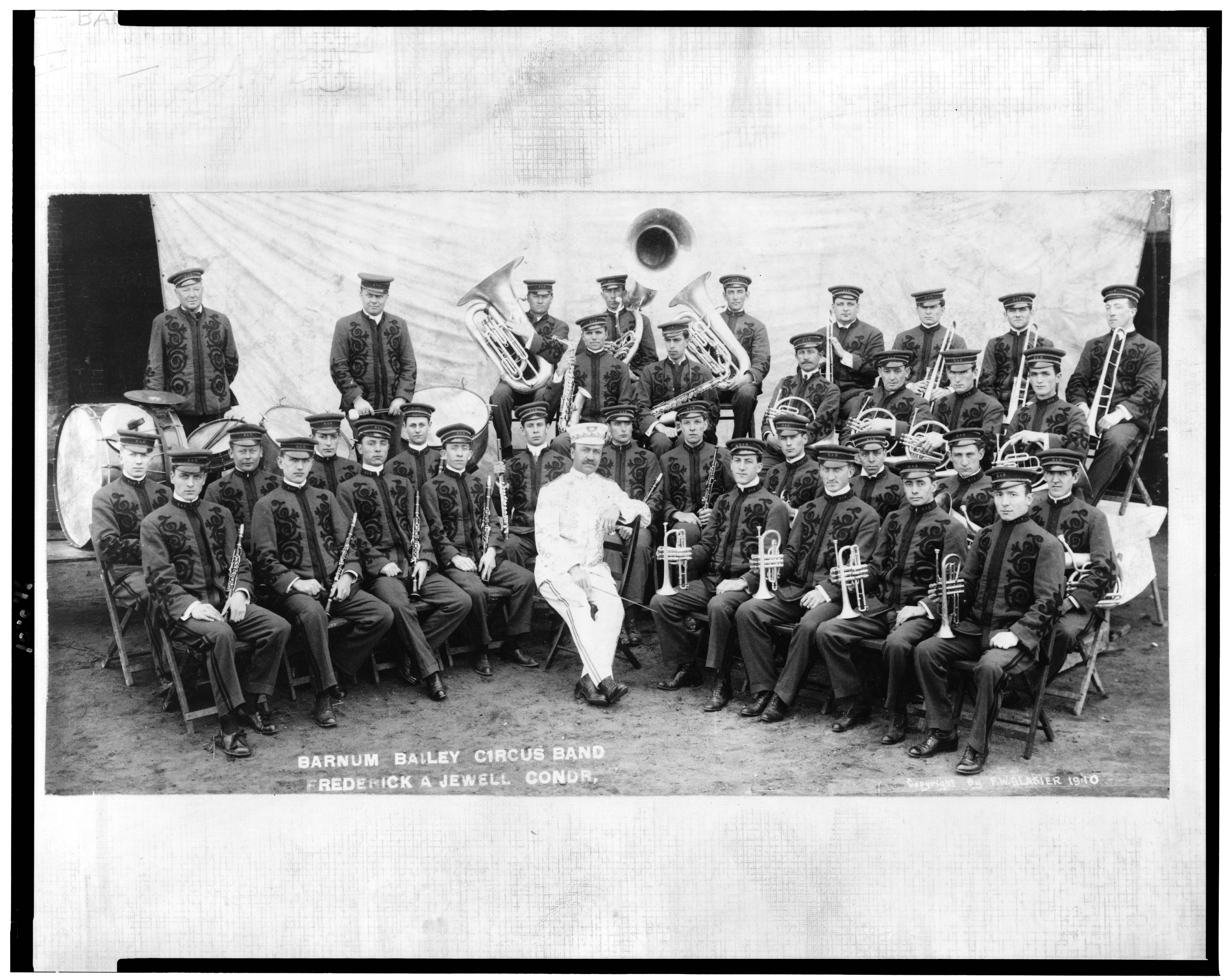
Barnum and Bailey circus band, 1910. Frederick A. Jewell conducting

One of the most recognized pieces of circus music is "Entrance of the Gladiators" by Julius Fučík (1872–1916). Fučík wrote almost 300 marches and dances, and for that reason he is often referred to as "Bohemian Sousa". Although his best-known piece is now famous in circus music, he did not compose with the intent of having his pieces played in a circus.

"Barnum and Bailey's Favorite" by Karl King (1892–1971) is a famous circus music piece. Unlike Fučík, King grew up performing circus music joining Robinson's Famous Circus at the age of 19 as a baritone player. During that time circus music needed its own style because modern music did not fit with most of the acts that the circus performed. This led to King's quick rise in popularity as a circus music composer for circuses everywhere.

Many other composers were well known for writing screamers, among them Fred Jewell and Henry Fillmore.

=== Instrumentation ===
As the styles of circus music changed, so has the instrumentation. With the nineteenth century came the introduction of brass bands. String instruments were no longer used in "traditional" circus bands to make "traditional" circus music, which is defined by Merle Evans as music that is brighter in tone than other music.

Sounds of cornets, trumpets, trombones, French horns, baritones, and tubas were able to reach far and wide, signaling to entire towns that the circus was around. Drums were also added to the circus bands and although saxophones have been arguable, they were frequently used as well. The calliope, built by Joshua C. Stoddard in 1856, was also used by the circus. Not a part of the circus band, it is a sometimes called a "circus piano" and is played like a piano, but powered by a steam boiler. Its sound can carry as far as nine miles.

Present-day circus music varies widely in instrumentation, style and form. It often incorporates the use of electric instruments and synthesizers alongside the more traditional instruments.

== Modern-day influence ==
=== Windjammers Unlimited ===
In 1971, Charles Bennett Jr. and Art Stensvad gathered fans of circus music and veteran circus bandleaders including Merle Evans into a circus music preservation society known as Windjammers Unlimited. According to the Windjammers Unlimited website, the name windjammers preserves historic circus slang.

"Because circus musicians spent their days 'jamming wind through their horns', they were known to others in the circus as 'windjammers.'"

The group meets twice annually to study and play the compositions of classic era circus music composers such as M. L. Lake and Karl L. King. They've also researched in the archives of the C.L. Barnhouse publishing company which was a major supplier of sheet music for circus bands.

=== Use in film ===
Music that imitates or evokes the sound of the circus has also been written, often showing up in film scores, some dedicated to the subject and some not. Nino Rota is known for his circus-inspired music that was written for many of Federico Fellini’s films, including I Clowns and 8 1/2. Jerry Goldsmith famously wrote a theme for the 1984 film Gremlins in such a style, which influenced the film makers to an extent.

=== Influence on musicians ===
Circus music and bands shaped the musicians who played with them. One example is Captain Kenneth R. Force, who went on to become a band director for the U.S. Merchant Marine Academy Regimental Band.

Other bands and musicians that have employed or often employ circus music in their work include Danny Elfman, Oingo Boingo, Tom Waits, Mr. Bungle, the Dickies, Panic! at the Disco, Legendary Shack Shakers, Mr. Strange/The Shanklin Freakshow and Kaizers Orchestra.

The music genre dark cabaret is heavily based on elements from circus music and from burlesque and vaudeville influences. Popular artists within the genre include The Tiger Lillies and Circus Contraption. Punk cabaret is also influenced by circus music. Artists include The Dresden Dolls, Amanda Palmer, and Emilie Autumn. The dance track "Disco Circus" is named for its resemblance to circus music. Post-hardcore and metalcore bands like The Venetia Fair, Ice Nine Kills, and Crown The Empire add circus music in some of their songs.

== See also ==
- Circus
- List of circuses and circus owners
- Category:Circus music
- Category:Circus musicians
- Cirque du Soleil
- Cirque du Soleil discography
- "Being for the Benefit of Mr. Kite!", 1967 Beatles song
- Entrance of the Gladiators
