= Screamer (march) =

Circus march

Troopers Tribunal (1905)
Henry Fillmore's Troopers Tribunal, a circus march for which Fillmore used a punning name – troupers, as in a circus troupe – in order to conceal whom he wrote the march for from his conservative father.

A screamer is a circus march intended to stir up the audience during the show.

== History ==
Screamers were mostly composed in a 60-year period (1895–1955). Circuses were in need of music that would stir the audience into a frenzy, as four-footed animals galloped across the ring. Ringmasters sought screamers because march music was a prominent part of American music at that time, and their quick tempo was what their inciting role demanded.

== Musicality ==
The Circus Bee
Fillmore's "The Circus Bee" performed by the United States Marine Corps Band

Rolling Thunder
Fillmore's "Rolling Thunder" performed by The Ceremonial Brass of the United States Air Force

Circus marches are faster than a normal military march, often 130 to 150 beats/minute. Although screamers tend to follow the march form, they are often abbreviated, and additions, such as a quick cornet call introduction to a new melody, are included. A typical screamer lasts a minute to three and a half minutes.

Screamers are a very demanding type of music, due to their extremely fast and advanced rhythms, especially the low-brass parts. Double and even triple tonguing is often required in order to play these rhythms. The trio in "The Melody Shop" is a good example of this. Many screamers have two prominent melodies playing at once. Although this is not unusual in a march, screamers tend to go further with this. The low-brass section can be playing a long, stately melody, while the woodwinds can be moving along with a phrase of 16th notes, or vice versa. Due to the circumstances in which screamers are played, dynamics tend to stay at a level forte. Unlike some military marches, piano is rarely used.

== Composers ==
Composers of screamers included Karl L. King, whose work included "Barnum & Bailey's Favorite", Fred Jewell and Henry Fillmore. John Philip Sousa wrote "On Parade" and a few others, but his writing in the circus march style is not highly regarded.

== Examples ==
- The ABA March by Edwin Franko Goldman
- Americans We by Henry Fillmore
- Barnum and Bailey's Favorite by Karl L. King
- Bennett's Triumphal by Melvin H. Ribble
- The Big Cage by Karl L. King
- The Billboard March by John N. Klohr
- Bombasto by Orion R. Farrar
- Bones Trombone by Henry Fillmore
- Bravura by Charles E. Duble
- Bugles and Drums by Edwin Franko Goldman
- The Circus Bee by Henry Fillmore
- Circus Days by Karl L. King
- Circus Echoes by Arthur W. Hughes
- Circus King by Charles E. Duble
- Coat of Arms by George Kenny
- Floto's Triumph by Fred Jewell
- His Honor by Henry Fillmore
- Invictus by Karl L. King
- In Storm and Sunshine by John Clifford Heed
- Klaxon by Henry Fillmore
- The Melody Shop by Karl L. King
- Onward and Upward by Edwin Franko Goldman
- Robinson's Grand Entree by Karl L. King
- Rolling Thunder by Henry Fillmore
- Sells-Floto Triumphal by Karl L. King
- The Squealer by Will Huff
- The Screamer by Frederick Jewell
- Smilin' Jack by Robert S. Keller
- Them Basses by Getty H. Huffine
- Whip and Spur by Thomas S. Allen

== Standard tempo marches frequently performed as screamers ==
- Entrance of the Gladiators (also known as Thunder and Blazes when played as a screamer) by Julius Fučík

== See also ==
- Circus music
- American march music
