= Huffer (surname) =

Huffer is a surname. Notable people with the surname include:

- Charles M. Huffer (1894–1981), American astronomer and academic
- Craig Huffer (born 1989), Australian middle-distance runner
- Fred K. Huffer (1879–1943), American composer and conductor
- Karin P. Huffer, American family therapist
- Lynne Huffer (born 1960), American feminist
- Sally Huffer (born 1965), American activist

== See also ==
- Hermann Hüffer (1830–1905), German historian and jurist
