= Orion R. Farrar =

American marching band director and composer

Orion R Farrar was a marching band director and composer.

Farrar was born in Indianapolis, Indiana in 1866, son of an English shoemaker and an Indiana woman. Soon after his birth, his family moved to Warren, Ohio. At the age of 19, Farrar enrolled in the famous Dana Musical Institute in Warren, studying theory, composition, and cornet playing. Following graduation, he taught brass instruments and conducted the Institute band for 7 years. He resigned from Dana in 1896 to organize the Indiana State Band, which he led for two years. He then returned to Ohio to form the Ohio State Band (unrelated to Ohio State University). He moved to Youngstown, Ohio in 1901, where he led the Youngstown Military Band. In 1915, he conducted the Lima, Ohio Municipal Band. He became a member of Old Erie Masonic Lodge No 3 in 1894 and was active until 1904, when he was expelled for non-payment of dues.

The final years of Farrar's life remain a mystery. He was purported to have died in California in 1929, but this is undocumented.

As a march composer, Farrar is most remembered for "Bombasto", "Indiana State Band", and "Hi Henry's Triumphal". "Bombasto" found an enduring place in the circus band repertoire, as well as in the libraries of municipal bands throughout America.

== Marches by Orion R Farrar ==
- Northeastern Ohio Band Association Overture (Farrar 1891)
- Alhotas (Cook 1895)
- Americus (Harry Coleman 1887)
- The Banner of Freedom (Carl Fischer Music 1901)
- Bombasto (Carl Fischer Music 1895)
- Canton Warren (Harry Coleman 1897)
- Col. Roosevelt's March (Carl Fischer Music 1898)
- Columbiana (Harry Coleman 1892)
- D.M.I. (Dana Musical Institute March) (Cook 1898)
- Fort Frayne (Harry Coleman 1901)
- Fort Omaha (Carl Fischer Music 1896)
- General Miles (Harry Coleman 1896)
- Hi Henry's Triumphal (Carl Fischer Music 1900)
- Indiana State Band (Harry Coleman 1896)
- Kokomo ( Harry Coleman 1896)
- The Little Napoleon (Harry Coleman 1896)
- The Loyal American (Carl Fischer Music 1901)
- McCune Cadets (Mace Gay 1894)
- Montgomery Club (Rothermel 1900)
- The New Dominion (Carl Fischer Music 1902)
- Ohio State Band (Coleman 1897)
- Old Erie (Carl Fischer Music 1895)
- St John Commandery (Harry Coleman 1899)
- Sergeant Ficken's March (Farrar & Heyser 1891)
- Tampa Club (Carl Fischer Music 1901)
- The Telegram (Harry Coleman 1900)
- Trumbull Club (Harry Coleman 1897)
- Vindicator (Harry Coleman 1897)
- Y M B (Youngstown Military Band )(J G Richards 1903)

== See also ==
- American March Music
- Screamer (march)
