= Bravura (disambiguation) =

Bravura is a style of both music and its performance intended to show off the skill of a performer.

Bravura may also refer to:

- Bravura, a march by Charles E. Duble
- Bravura étude, Op. 63 No. 24 by Amédée Méreaux
- Bravura, an imprint of Malibu Comics
- Bravura, the protagonist of Asterix and the Secret Weapon
