= Charles E. Duble =

American circus musician and composer (1884–1960)

Charles Duble
- Born: September 13, 1884; Jeffersonville, Indiana, U.S.
- Died: August 1960 (aged 75) Jeffersonville, Indiana, U.S.
- Genres: Circus music
- Instruments: Trombone

Charles Edward Duble (September 13, 1884 – August 1960) was an American band musician and composer. He played for 23 years in circus bands.

== Career ==
Duble's career started as a trombonist with Sun Bros. Circus in 1909, and he played in others such as the Gentry Brothers Dog and Pony Show, H. W. Campbell's United Shows, John Robinson's Big Ten Shows, Barnum & Bailey's Greatest Show on Earth, Hagenbeck-Wallace Circus, Sells-Floto Circus, Sparks, Robbins Brothers, the Miller Brothers 101 Ranch Wild West Show, Russell Bros. Circus, Downie Bros. Circus, and finally under the baton of Merle Evans, with Ringling Bros. and Barnum & Bailey Circus. Duble was a tall, lanky trombone player with a notable sense of humor. He left the sawdust trail to return to Jeffersonville until his death. He was elected to the Windjammers Circus Musicians' Hall of Fame in 1980.

== See also ==
- American march music
- Screamer (march)
