= John N. Klohr =

American composer, arranger and trombonist

The Billboard March (1901)
The Billboard March (1901), played by the U.S. Air Force Band in 1998

John Nicholas Klohr (July 27, 1869 – February 17, 1956) was a composer of band music. Klohr was born in Cincinnati, Ohio. A graduate of the Cincinnati public schools, Klohr set upon a career in music, especially vaudeville. He was a vaudeville trombonist by trade, but also performed as a member of Cincinnati's musical life. He played in the Syrian Temple Shrine Band, led by fellow composer Henry Fillmore. From 1921 to 1926, Klohr was a trombonist in Henry Fillmore's concert band. He was a member of the Syrian Temple for over 50 years, as well as a member of the Knights of Pythias and the Fraternal Order of Eagles. Klohr was also an early member of the American Society of Composers, Authors, and Publishers and worked as editor of the band and orchestra department of the John Church Company, a music publisher in Cincinnati. Klohr died of a heart attack in 1956, and was buried at St. Joseph Cemetery in Cincinnati.

== Compositions ==
Names in parentheses are publishers and copyright dates

- Arch of Steel March (Fillmore 1935)
- The Billboard March (Church 1901) (His most famous march)
- Blanchester March (Fillmore 1938)
- Blazing the Trail March ( Fillmore 1938 )
- Breezing Along March (Fillmore 1938)
- Cincinnati Post March (Church 1902)
- Classroom & Campus March (Fillmore 1938)
- Corson Grouch
- Corsonian Polka (Cornet Solo) (Church)
- Dusky Princess Characteristic (Century Music 1900)
- Echoes from the South Medley (Church 1916)
- Federation March (Church 1910)
- Fellowship March (Church 1916)
- Flagship March (Fillmore 1938)
- Headliner March (Fillmore 1938)
- Heads Up March (Church 1925)
- High Tide March (Fillmore 1938)
- Jasmo One Step (Church 1917)
- Ma Mobile Babe Cakewalk (Church 1899)
- Marching Feet March (Fillmore 1938)
- Mass Formation March (Fillmore 1938)
- Medley of Gospel Hymns (Church 1919)
- Men of Valor March (Church 1920)
- National Melodies No 3 (Church 1905)
- Old Kentucky Home Medley (Church 1904)
- Onward Christian Soldiers Medley (Presser)
- Our Patriots March (Church 1905)
- Peace & Progress March (Fillmore 1938)
- Pennant Bearer March (Fillmore 1938)
- Pocatello March (Fillmore 1938)
- The President's Choice (Church 1904)
- Queen of the Surf March (Church 1904)
- Shoulder to Shoulder March (Church 1919)
- Side by Side March (Fillmore 1938)
- The Slogan March (Church 1912)
- Soaring Eagle March (Church 1929)
- The Specialist March (Church)
- The Spotlight March (Church 1927)
- Strongheart March (Fillmore 1938)
- Swastika (Good Luck) March (Church 1907)
- Torch of Liberty March (Fillmore 1941)
- Tullulah Waltzes (Church 1918)
- Vera Cruz March (Fillmore 1938)
- Vigilance March (Church 1938)
- Vox Pop March (Fillmore 1938)
- A Warrior Bold March (Church 1914)
- What a Friend We Have in Jesus (Church 1903)
- Y M I March (Church 1895)
- Youth on Parade (Fillmore 1938)

== See also ==
- Screamers (marches)
- American March Music
