= Paintersville =

Paintersville may refer to:

- Paintersville, California, an unincorporated community
- Paintersville, Ohio, an unincorporated community
