= Floppotron =

Musical instrument created by Polish engineer Paweł Zadrożniak

The Floppotron is a musical instrument created by Polish engineer Paweł Zadrożniak.

It is made of a synchronized array of partially obsolete computer hardware programmed to play tunes. The current Floppotron 3.0 build sports 512 floppy drives, 16 hard drives, and 4 flatbed scanners. The net effect is of a robot orchestra.

== Development ==
=== First version ===
The first version of the instrument was built in 2011 and consisted of two floppy drives and an ATMega microcontroller. The sound is generated by the magnetic head moved by its stepper motor. To make a specific sound, the head must be moved with appropriate frequency.

The invention gained public notoriety with a demonstration of the Imperial March posted on YouTube achieving more than 6 million views.

=== 2.0 version ===
In 2016 Paweł Zadrożniak improved his previous version of the Floppotron with 64 floppy drives, 8 hard drives, and two flatbed scanners. Every column of 8 FDDs was connected to one 8-channel controller built on ATMega16 microcontroller; the HD was controlled by 2 push-pull outputs built with discrete SMD MOSFETs. The Scanner head controllers were built using off-the-shelf boards – an Arduino Uno. On June 6, 2022, Floppotron 2.0 was officially decommissioned.

=== 3.0 version ===
On June 13, 2022, a 3.0 version of the Floppotron was unveiled with 512 floppy disk drives, 16 hard disks and 4 scanners. The first piece played publicly on the Floppotron 3.0 is Entry of the Gladiators.

== Operating principles ==
Any device with an electric motor is able to generate a sound. Scanners and floppy drives use stepper motors to move the head with sensors which scan an image or perform read/write operations on a magnetic disk. The sound generated by a motor depends on its driving speed: the higher the frequency, the greater the pitch. Hard disks use a magnet and a coil to position the head. When voltage is supplied for long enough, the head speeds up and hits the mechanical stop making the "drum hit” sound.

The Floppotron translates MIDI music files into a series of discrete commands telling the devices when to buzz, click, and remain silent.

== Song covers ==
As of April 2019 there are more than one hundred songs played with the Floppotron in Zadrożniak's YouTube page. The songs include Queen's "Bohemian Rhapsody", Nirvana's "Smells Like Teen Spirit", White Stripes's "Seven Nation Army", Eurythmics "Sweet Dreams", Michael Jackson's "Thriller" and "Song 2" by Blur.
