= Frederick A. Fillmore =

American composer and music publisher

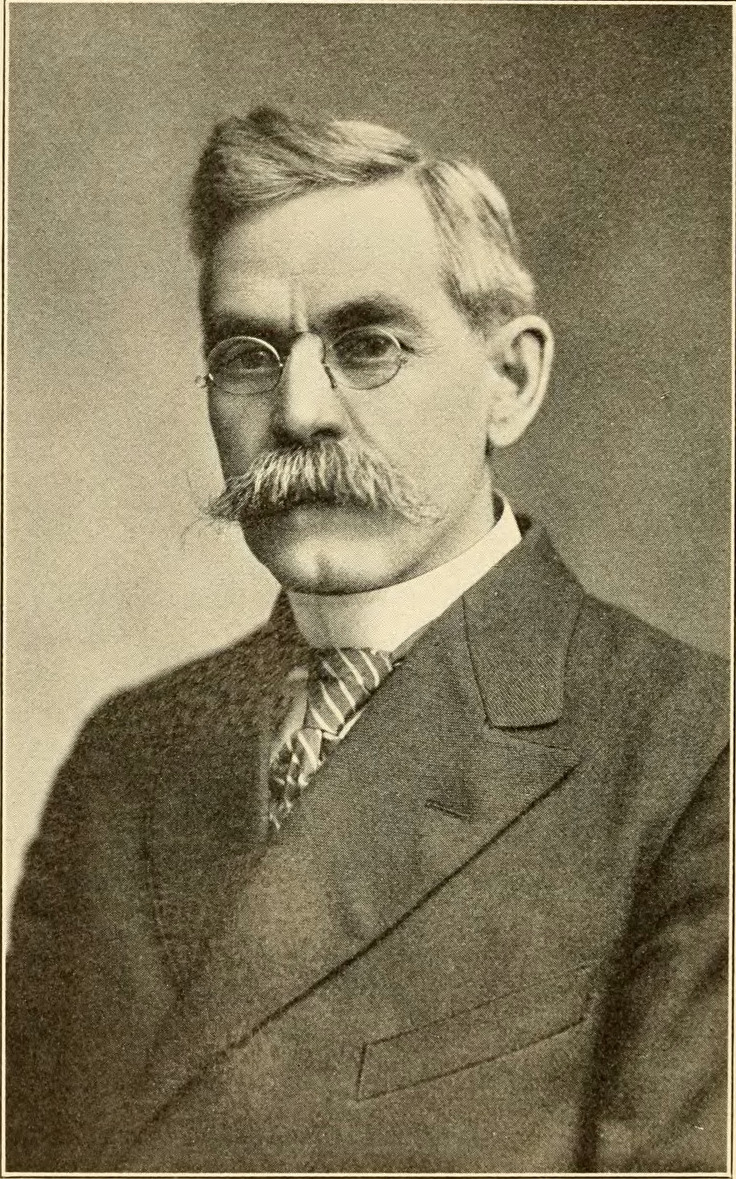
- Frederick A. Fillmore, circa 1914
- Born: May 15, 1856; Paris, Illinois, U.S.
- Died: November 16, 1925 (aged 69); Terrace Park, Ohio, U.S.
- Occupations: Composer, music publisher
- Spouse: Laura Fillmore
- Relatives: Millard Fillmore (cousin)

Frederick Augustus Fillmore (May 15, 1856 – November 16, 1925) was an American composer and music publisher, and the co-founder of the Fillmore Music House.

== Composer and publisher ==
Fillmore was the vice-president of the Fillmore Music House which he co-founded with his brother, James H. Fillmore, in 1874 in Cincinnati, Ohio. He was the composer of over 200 church hymns and the editor of two hymnals published by the firm.

At the time of his death, his most popular hymn was "Seeds of Promise" (1923), which was also published under its first line "O Scatter Seeds of Loving Deeds". Fillmore co-wrote the song with gospel lyricist Jessie H. Brown. According to the Hymnary.org website, it is included in 59 different church hymnals.

== Prohibitionist ==
Fillmore was a special contributor to "Fillmore's Prohibition Songs", a 224-page collection of patriotic songs published by the Fillmore Music House to provide music appropriate for prohibitionist meetings and campaigns.

In 1910 he made an unsuccessful run for Ohio state representative on the Prohibition Party ticket.

== Personal life ==
A relative of Millard Fillmore, the 13th U.S. president, Frederick Fillmore was the superintendent of Franklin Community Sunday School in 1923.

Fillmore died November 16, 1925, in Terrace Park, Ohio, following a hospital operation. He was survived by his wife, Laura, and their two sons and two daughters.

== Publications ==
- Heart Songs: For Sunday Schools (Fillmore Brothers, Cincinnati, Ohio; New York 1893)
- Songs of Rejoicing: a collection of new songs for the Sunday-school (Fillmore Brothers, Cincinnati, Ohio 1888)
