= National Emblem =

American march

- March by Edwin Eugene Bagley
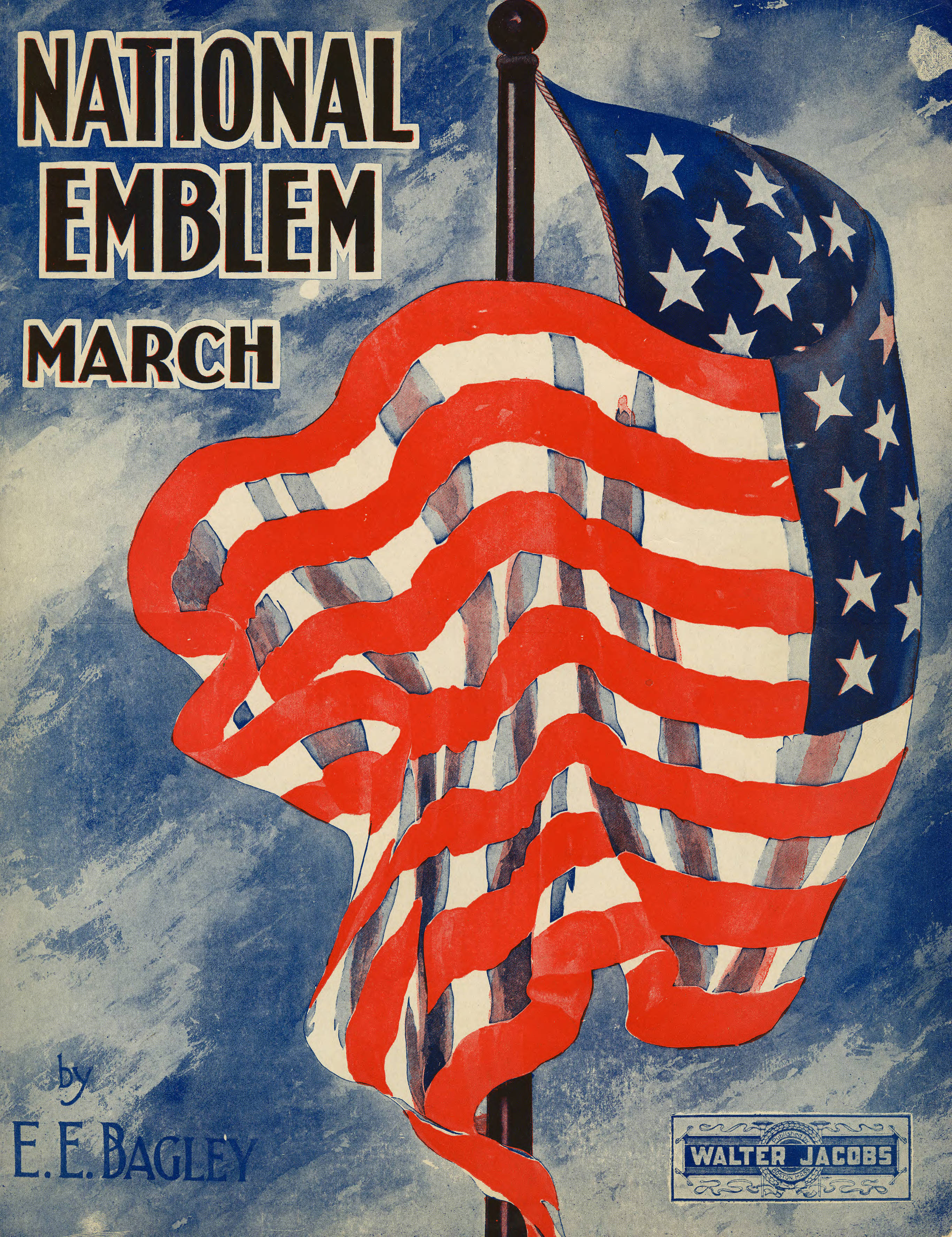
- Composed: 1902
- Published: 1906
- Recorded: 19 May 1908
- "National Emblem" played by the U.S. Army Band

"National Emblem", also known as the National Emblem March, is a U.S. march composed in 1902 and published in 1906 by Edwin Eugene Bagley. It is a standard of the U.S. march repertoire, appearing in eleven published editions. The U.S. military uses the trio section as ceremonial music for the entry of the ceremony's official party.

The National Emblem March is also used extensively by the Macao Public Security Police Force at parades.

== History ==
National Emblem March
Trio section of "National Emblem March", played by the United States Army Band

"National Emblem March", performed in 1977 by the U.S. Naval Academy Band

Bagley composed the score during a 1902 train tour with his family band, Wheeler's Band of Bellows Falls, Vermont. He became frustrated with the ending, and tossed the composition in a bin. Members of the band retrieved it and secretly rehearsed the score in the baggage car. Bagley was surprised when the band informed him minutes before the next concert that they would perform it. It became the most famous of all of Bagley's marches. Despite this the composition did not make Bagley wealthy; he sold the copyright for $25.

In the first strain, Bagley incorporated the first twelve notes of "The Star-Spangled Banner" played by euphonium, bassoon, alto clarinet, tenor saxophone, and trombone, disguised in duple rather than triple time. The rest of the notes are all Bagley's, including the four short repeated A-flat major chords that lead to a statement by the low brass that is now reminiscent of the national anthem. Unusually, Bagley's march does not incorporate either a breakstrain or a stinger. However the exact repetition of the trio's melody at a chromatic mediant (A-flat Major/m.3 of Trio, then C Major/m.10 of Trio) is suggestive of a breakstrain.

The band of Arthur Pryor made the first recording of the march on May 19, 1908, followed by a United States Marine Band recording on March 21, 1914 (both recordings by the Victor Talking Machine Company).

== Reception ==
John Philip Sousa once listed the five most effective street marches ever written. Sousa listed four of his own compositions, but he selected "National Emblem" for the fifth. When Sousa formed and conducted the 350-member U.S. Navy Jacket Band at the Naval Station Great Lakes he chose five marches for World War I Liberty bond drives. Four were by Sousa—"Semper Fidelis", "Washington Post", "The Thunderer", "Stars and Stripes Forever", and Bagley's "National Emblem March".

== Legacy ==
"National Emblem March" was the favorite march composition of Frederick Fennell, who made an arrangement of it in 1981. Fennell called the piece "as perfect a march as a march can be".

Besides Fennell's arrangement, there are also band arrangements by Albert Morris (1978), Andrew Balent (1982), Paul Lavender (1986), and Loris J. Schissel (2000).

== In popular culture ==
- In 1960 a group of studio musicians led by Ernie Freeman recorded a rock and roll arrangement of the tune, which was subsequently released as a Liberty Records single under the title National City and credited to the Joiner (Arkansas) Junior High School Band. It became a minor hit, reaching #53 on the Billboard Hot 100 chart.
- The march has been featured in films such as Miracle on 34th Street, The Dirty Dozen, Protocol and Hot Shots!.
- A theme from the march is quoted in Phil Ochs's song The War Is Over.
