= Arthur Wellesley Hughes =

Canadian musician and composer

Arthur Wellesley Hughes (8 April 1863;18 April 1937) was a Canadian musician and composer. Possibly born in Kingston, Ontario (although his WW1 papers consistently list his birthplace as either Bloomington or Birmingham Illinois, he separated from his family at a young age, spending many years in the United States as an itinerant circus musician. He was a performer on piano, calliope, and alto horn.

He enlisted for WW1 service in Toronto in 1915, claiming a date of birth of 1873, but was discharged as medically unfit in 1916 and his age is then noted as 53.5 years. He served as a bandmaster for the 76th Battalion.

His circus associations on record include: Mighty Haag Circus, Downie & Wheeler Circus (1912); Hagenbeck-Wallace Circus (1922); Sells-Floto Circus (1923); and Ringling Bros & Barnum & Bailey Combined Shows (1924–26). He was with Robbins Bros. Circus (1928–29) whence his Robbins Bros. Triumphal March arose, and Miller Bros. 101 Ranch Wild West Show, and Walter L. Main Circus (1930–31). Hughes worked as composer and arranger for the Waterloo Music Company of Waterloo, Ontario, from 1932 to 1935. At other times, Hughes worked as arranger in the Whaley, Royce and Cundy-Bettoney publishing houses. According to his own account, Hughes wrote band music in the US for much of his life, under various pen names, including Arthur Wellesley and H W Arthur.

In his 70s, Hughes returned to Kansas, which he considered his home. He died in Belleville Hospital in New York City hospital in 1937 from pneumonia and heart disease, reportedly in the indigent ward, and was buried in Hart Island.

== Compositions ==
"St. Julien"
Performed by the United States Air Force Band of the Rockies

Names in parentheses are publishers and copyright dates.

Composed under the name A W Hughes

- Aces High Galop (unpublished manuscript)
- Ambassador March (Mace Gay 1897)
- Aquitania March (Cundy Bettoney 1915)
- Belle of Coontown Dance (Mace Gay 1895)
- Canada, Land of Liberty Medley
- Canadian Patriots Medley (Waterloo 1930)
- Carry On March (Cundy Bettoney 1940)
- Chain Lightning Galop (unpublished manuscript)
- Champlain March (Cundy Bettoney 1923)
- Charter of Liberty March (Cundy Bettoney 1921)
- Circus Echoes Galop (C L Barnhouse 1928)
- Comrades All March (Cundy Bettoney 1921)
- Corinthian March (Mace Gay 1895)
- Darkey's Connundrum – song & dance (Mace Gay 1895)
- The Dawn of Peace March (Cundy-Bettoney 1920)
- Del Rio March (Cundy Bettoney 1925)
- Dufferin March (Whaley, Royce 1910)
- Echoes from the Harem (Cundy-Bettoney 1917)
- Eventide (Walter Jacobs 1923)
- Fond du Lac March (Cundy-Bettoney 1913)
- Fort Garry March (Whaley, Royce 1911)
- Fraternity March (unpublished manuscript)
- Greater Boston March (unpublished manuscript)
- Hail Edward VII
- Hospitality March (Waterloo 1930)
- In the Lead March (Waterloo 1930)
- In Old Quebec March (Whaley, Royce 1908)
- Italia Giovinezza March Medley (Cundy-Bettoney 1928)
- Little Bugler (Karl King 1930)
- Mediterranean March (H C Miller 1925)
- Novelette (Cundy-Bettoney 1917)
- Novelty Overture (Karl King 1930)
- Our Commonwealth March (Cundy-Bettoney 1940)
- Our Pilot March (Cundy-Bettoney 1940)
- The Proclamation March (Cundy-Bettoney 1918)
- Red Deer March (Whaley, Royce 1911)
- Reign of Peace March (Whaley, Royce 1894)
- The Rosedale Three Step
- Rose Festival Waltz (Waterloo 1931)
- St Augustine March (Mace Gay 1895)
- St. Julien March (Cundy-Bettoney 1918) – Currently is one of Hughes best and well-known marches which is at present, commonly played at parades involving the United States Armed Forces and halftime drill performances by the Fightin' Texas Aggie Band on Kyle Field.
- Salute to the Adjutant March (Ditson 1927)
- Salute to Buffalo March (Whaley, Royce 1901)
- Salute to Mars March (Mace Gay 1895)
- Spark Plug Galop (unpublished manuscript)
- Tipperary Tommy March (Whaley, Royce 1916)
- The Tournament March (Whaley Royce 1894)
- Unique Overture (Karl King 1929)
- United Empire March (Whaley, Royce 1897)
- Utility March (Karl King 1929)
- Veteran Brigade March (Cundy-Bettoney 1940)
- Ye Old Tyme March (unpublished manuscript)

Composed under name of O.A. Gilson

- Robbins Bros. Triumphal March (C L Barnhouse 1928)
- Vindicator Concert March (unpublished manuscript)

== See also ==
- Screamer (march)
- American march music
