= Massieville, Ohio =

Unincorporated community in Ohio, U.S.

Coordinates: 39°15′24″N 82°58′06″W

Massieville is an unincorporated community and Census-designated place in Ross County, in the U.S. state of Ohio. As of the 2020 census, Massieville had a population of 584.

== History ==
Variant names were "Massie" and "Waller". The community has the name of Waller Massie, the proprietor of a local sawmill.

== Geography ==
Massieville is located in the Appalachian region of Ohio, south of Chillicothe.

== Demographics ==
The population of Massieville was 584 at the 2020 census, of those 584 people, 91% were White, 2.5% were African American, 1.8% were Hispanic or Latino, 0.1% were Asian, 0.1% were from other races, and 5.9% were from two or more races.

== Education ==
It is in the Chillicothe City School District.

== Notable person ==
Will Huff, a composer, was born at Massieville in 1875.
