= Fred Jewell =

American composer (1875–1936)

The Outlook (1913)
Performed by the United States Air Force Band

Frederick Alton Jewell (May 28, 1875, in Worthington, Indiana – February 11, 1936, in Worthington, Indiana), was a prolific musical composer who wrote over 100 marches and screamers, including:

Fred Jewell
- "Battle Royal" (1909)
- "Floto's Triumph" (1906)
- "Quality Plus" (1913)
- "The Outlook" (1913)
- "E Pluribus Unum" (1917)
- "Supreme Triumph" (1920)
- "The Screamer" (1921)
- "The Old Circus Band" (1923)

At the age of 16, Jewell ran away from home and joined the Gentry Bros. Dog & Pony Show as a euphonium player. He also played the calliope.

After making excellent impressions with successful circus officials, Jewell rose through the ranks. He eventually landed himself as the leader of the Ringling Bros. and Barnum & Bailey Circus band (like Karl King, another successful American composer of his time). He also played in or directed the Hagenbeck-Wallace Circus and the Sells-Floto Circus.

Jewell retired from circuses in 1918. He traveled to Iowa and took leadership of the Iowa Brigade Band. From there he began his own publishing company and moved back to his hometown, Worthington, and served as high school band director, as well as a steady composer of band music. He directed other local bands in Florida and Indiana also.

Frederick Jewell died in 1936 at the age of 61 in Worthington.

== See also ==
- Circus music
