= Fred K. Huffer =

- Born: January 1, 1879; Stewardson, Illinois, United States
- Died: August 23, 1943 (aged 64)
- Occupations: Composer, conductor

Fred K. Huffer (January 1, 1879 – August 28, 1943) was an American early 20th century composer and conductor.

== Early life ==
Born into a musical family, Fred Huffer's father was an accomplished violinist and orchestra conductor. Huffer's music education was established early in his life. The Huffer family moved to Helena, Montana in 1889. At age sixteen, Fred played E-flat alto horn in the local band. Moving back to Chicago, Illinois in 1899, Fred played in various bands in the city.

== Career ==
In 1901, the Ringling Brothers Circus came to Chicago. Finding out they were auditioning for a baritone player, he tried out and got the job, and went on the road with the circus, catching the "circus fever." For the next eight years, he played with various shows. Along the way, he met Kate Jeronimus and they were married. No children were born from their union.

After eight years, the Huffers were back in Chicago. Fred took a job with a large plumbing equipment manufacturer; Crane Company as the leader of the company band. For his two years at Crane, Fred also worked and advised Chicago suburban bands.

Upon leaving Crane Company in 1911, he formed his own band: "Huffer and His Band." He was successful for several years. When the First World War broke out, he had now devoted his time into composing while conducting several bands in the Chicago area. During the war, he wrote many songs and marches, his most famous being "Black Jack March" in honor of General Pershing in 1917. After the war, he continued his composing and for a period was a staff arranger at Harry L. Afford's custom arranging house in Chicago.

He became known in musical circles as a composer of military band music and an arranger of popular pieces for piano and orchestra. By 1937, he entered the Masonic order and led the band of the St. Bernard's Commandery. He also was the assistant director of the Medina Shrine Band.

== Works ==
During his circus years, he was influenced to write a few works, his most lasting is a Slick Slide style subtitled "A Trombone Tone Poem." It was in the traditional style of Henry Fillmore and was published by Dixie Music Company in 1917.

During World War One, Fred Huffer composed various song and march music. His most lasting march is "Black Jack March" in honor of General Pershing. Not as well known as John Philip Sousa, he nonetheless left an indelible mark on American music during the war, with his various works in the National Archives and Library, which includes such titles as: "Salute the Gang" and "If I Should Get a Cross for Bravery."

Some of his other well-known works include: "Short'nin Bread"; "Ten Thousand Cattle" in the movie "My Darling Clementine" and again "Black Jack March" in the movie "Taps."

== Death and legacy ==
After a long illness, he died on August 28, 1943. He is buried in Kenosha, Wisconsin.
