= Paintersville, Ohio =

Unincorporated community in Ohio, U.S.

Coordinates: 39°35′08″N 83°49′11″W

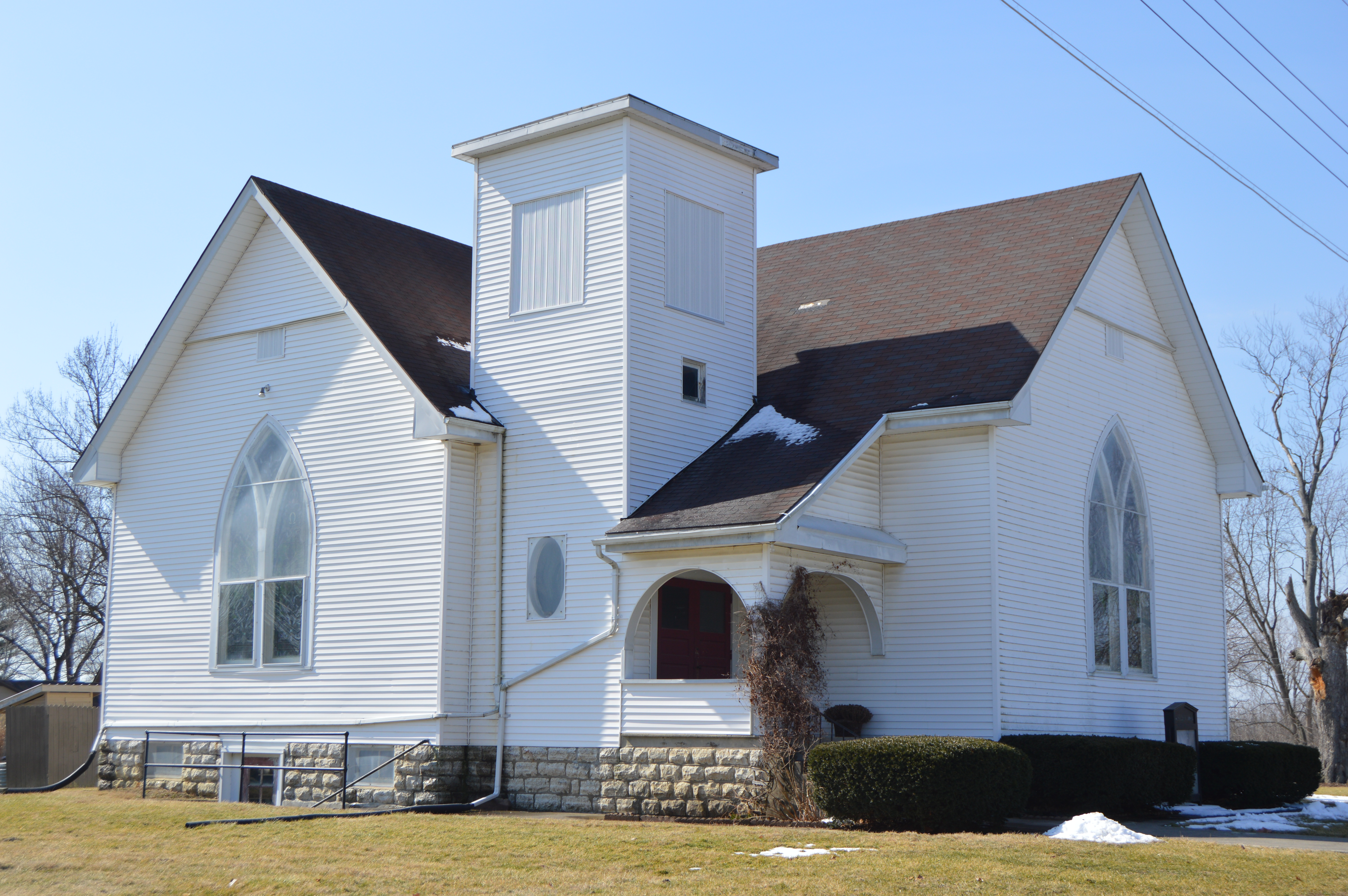
Former Methodist church

Paintersville is an unincorporated community in Greene County, in the U.S. state of Ohio.

== History ==
Paintersville was platted in 1837, and named for Jesse Painter, the town merchant. A post office called Paintersville was established in 1847, and remained in operation until 1910.

== Notable person ==
Karl King, bandmaster and composer
