= The Circus Bee =

Circus march composed by Henry Fillmore

The Circus Bee
Henry Fillmore's "The Circus Bee" performed by the United States Marine Corps Band

"The Circus Bee" is a circus march, or screamer, composed by musician Henry Fillmore and published by his family's publishing house in February 1908. It is a technically advanced composition and is used as openers and encores in concerts.

The march is named after an imaginary circus newspaper and reflects Fillmore's lifelong interest in circuses and his experiences while touring with five different shows.
