= Sally Huffer =

American LGBT activist

Personal details
- Born: September 17, 1965 (age 61) Elgin, Illinois (USA)
- Education: Columbia College Chicago
- Profession: Broadcast Communication, Community Project Specialist

Sally Huffer (born September 17, 1965) is an American LGBT activist that resides in Houston (Texas, USA).

== Personal life and education ==
Huffer was born and raised in the middle class community of Elgin, Illinois — a suburb of Chicago. As a child, Huffer was active in YWCA, Camp Fire Girls, and did volunteering at nursing homes around the community. Huffer has a twin sister, along with an older and younger brother. They, like Huffer, all work for nonprofit organizations and she credits their upbringing and childhood as a major driving force for employment in the nonprofit sector.

== Move to Houston ==
Huffer moved to Houston in 1994 to serve as the Vice President and Operation Manager of USA Broadcasting of Houston, Inc. She remained in this position until 1999, when her position was cut to facilitate the merging of the station. Shortly after the move, she began to volunteer for various organizations including the Houston Society of Performing Arts, America's Promise, in addition to logging in over 1000 service hours with the MD Anderson Cancer Center.

== Community activism ==
In the mid-1990s, when Huffer moved to Houston, she became deeply involved in gay and lesbian organizations. Huffer cites the culture shock and shift in tone in regards to GLBT issues as a primary reason for becoming drawn into advocacy.

In 1996, she became active in Parents, Families, and Friends of Lesbians and Gays (PFLAG), where she worked on the membership committee and subsequently served as membership coordinator. She sat on the board of the Gay Men's Chorus for two years helping to bring on an executive director and make critical changes to the organization. Additionally, she has served on the board of the American Civil Liberties Union (ACLU), coordinating Banned Book Week and helping to ensure the ACLU had a presence in the Houston Pride Parade. Huffer's involvement in the ACLU stemmed from her background in broadcasting, as she is a strong supporter of freedom of speech, freedom of expression, and women's right. Although she no longer works closely with the organization, she is still a supporter of the ACLU's mission.

Huffer became involved with the Montrose Counseling Center (MCC) while organizing a successful fundraiser for the ACLU having little help and resources. The executive director of the MCC observed Huffer's hard work and encouraged her to apply for a position at MCC. She was subsequently hired by MCC in August 2000 in the marketing and fundraising departments and now serves as the Community Project Specialist for the center. MCC specifically focuses on the needs of the GLBT community, by providing both psychological and behavioral assistance. In response to the lack of mental health services, MCC established a number of programs, many of which Huffer is involved in, to help empower the LGBT community. At MCC, Sally is involved with the HATCH program, which deals with LGBT and questioning youth and SPRY, which is a program that helps GLBT senior citizens deal with issues of home and health assistance. Huffer also works with MCC's antiviolence program, which provides resources and assistance for victims of bias and hate crimes, sexual assault, and domestic violence in addition to the Gay and Lesbian Switchboard, a 24-hour crisis hotline. In addition to training individuals for the Gay and Lesbian Switchboard, she helps maintain contact and referrals among LGBT organizations in the community.

Huffer currently sits on the board of Kindred Spirits Foundation Inc., an organization that raises money and awareness for various women's groups. Kindred Spirits was formed in response to the closing of a popular bar and hub for Houston's lesbian community.

Huffer's involvement with The Conference of the Futures of Lesbians, Gays, Bisexuals, Transgenders, Intersexed, Questioning and Allied Residents of the Greater Houston Metropolitan Area (Futures Conference) aimed to address solutions to combat homelessness in Houston. In addition, Huffer has been an advocate for providing GLBT, homeless youth with LGBT and LGBT-friendly families to not only help teens, but to curb the homeless rate in the Neartown area of Houston.

In the wake of Hurricanes Katrina and Rita, Huffer played a role in providing resources and shelter for displaced gay, lesbian, and transgender individuals through MCC. In November 2005, she was interviewed by SATYA Magazine in which she noted a major concern was the sexual orientation and gender based discrimination faced in the Federal Emergency Management Agency (FEMA) and Red Cross shelters. To help with relocation, housing assistance, and HIV/AIDS care, MCC, through the help of Huffer, provided case management tools, started support groups, coordinated a housing database, and modified the Gay and Lesbian Switchboard to meet the needs of those displaced.

In her spare time, Huffer is active with the Houston GLBT Community Center, Gulf Coast Archive and Museum, and has written for OutSmart Magazine, a Houston magazine for the gay, lesbian, and transgender community. In addition, she edited the Houston Press' "Best of Houston" editions in 2000 and 2001.
