= Black Jack March =

- March by Fred K. Huffer
- Composed: c. 1910s: U.S.
- Dedication: General John J. "Black Jack" Pershing

"Black Jack March" was written by Fred K. Huffer (1879–1943), an early 20th century composer. It was named after General John J. "Black Jack" Pershing. Written in a 6/8 meter, trumpets and drums are featured with a trumpet call.

== Sheet music, early recordings, and commercial success ==
The original sheet music has a cover, which features a drawing of General Pershing. Scores for small orchestras originally sold for 25 cents and full scores sold for 40 cents. It was reprinted by the Fisher Thompson Music Pub. Co. in 1919.

It has been used by music teachers and has a Grade of "3". It was included in the March Masters Folio for Band published by Rubank in 1948.

== Later performances ==
- The University of South Carolina band performed the march in a February 1956 concert under the direction of Donald L. Banschbach.
- The University of Oklahoma marching band recorded it for their album Pride of Oklahoma, 1987.
- The Texas A&M University band recorded it for their album Tradition, Vol. 3: Legacy of the March.
- In 2004, the United States Air Force Heritage of America Band, with Colonel Lowell Graham conducting, included a version on the album Riders for the Flag.
- The United States Army Field Band performed it for the album Duty, Honor, Country: A Salute to the American Soldier.
