= Edwin Eugene Bagley =

American composer

Edwin Eugene "E. E." Bagley (May 29, 1857 – January 29, 1922) was an American composer most famous for composing the march National Emblem.

Bagley was born in Craftsbury, Vermont on May 29, 1857. He began his music career at age nine as a vocalist and comedian with Leavitt's Bellringers, a company of entertainers that toured many of the larger cities of the United States. Bagley began playing the cornet, traveling with the Swiss Bellringers for six years. After his touring days, Bagley joined Blaisdell's Orchestra of Concord, New Hampshire.

In 1880, Bagley came to Boston as a solo cornet player at The Park Theater. For nine years, he traveled with the Bostonians, an opera company. While with this company, Bagley changed from cornet to trombone. He also performed with the Germania Band of Boston and the Boston Symphony Orchestra. In the early 1900s, Bagley played with Wheeler's Band in Bellows Falls, Vermont. Wheeler's Band was the first to publicly perform Bagley's "National Emblem March" in 1906.

Bagley is best known for composing marches, particularly the famous march National Emblem. This piece is played as a patriotic tune on Independence Day celebrations in the United States and features an excerpt from "The Star-Spangled Banner". It is also used by the U.S. military when presenting and retiring the colors. A theme from this march is popularly sung with the words "and the monkey wrapped his tail around the flagpole".

Bagley died at the Elliot Community Hospital in Keene, New Hampshire, on January 29, 1922; he was 64 years old. Bagley is buried at the Greenlawn Cemetery in Keene.

Edwin was married to Jannette S. Hoyt (1855–1927). His older brother, Ezra M. Bagley (January 3, 1853 – July 8, 1886), was the first trumpeter in the Boston Symphony Orchestra from 1880 to 1884 and also composed marches for bands.

== Bagley's Marches ==
- L'Agresseur (The Aggressor) March (1915)
- America Victorious
- American Salute
- Arbitrator March (1908)
- Bagley's Imperial March (1901)
- The Betrothal Overture
- Bostonese (1907)
- Col. Estey March (1908)
- Counselor March (1917)
- Father of His Country March (1931)
- Federation March
- Front Section March (1909)
- Hike.
- Holy Cross Commandery March (1902)
- Knight Templar March (1911)
- March Imperial
- The Morning Light March (1900)
- National Emblem (1906)
- Our Republic March (1908)
- Patriot March (1902)
- Post 68 G.A.R. (1902)
- Regent March
- Royal March (1902)
- Sunshine Overture

== See also ==
- March music composers
