= Rolling Thunder (march) =

1916 circus march composed by Henry Fillmore

Composition
- Published: March 19, 1916 (Note: Published under 4755.)
- Genre: Circus march
- Composer: Henry Fillmore

Rolling Thunder
Henry Fillmore's "Rolling Thunder performed by the Ceremonial Brass of the United States Air Force."

"Rolling Thunder" is a screamer composed by Henry Fillmore in 1916. Featuring a fast and extremely technical trombone part, it is usually performed at a quick tempo as an opener or encore of concerts. The piece is considered one of Fillmore's most popular marches.
