= Frank Panella =

Frank A. Panella (January 14, 1878 – May 13, 1953) was a composer and arranger for band, best known for his march On the Square. Panella was born in Pittsburgh, Pennsylvania and began playing clarinet at age seven. He was a member of the Pittsburgh Symphony Orchestra, taught at the University of Pittsburgh and Carnegie Tech, served as director of the Grand Army Band and the Westinghouse Air Brake Company Band, and founded the Panella Music Company. He died in Crafton, Pennsylvania at the age of 75.
