= Will Huff =

William Lockwood Huff (January 16, 1875 – November 5, 1942) was a composer of band music best known for his military marches and the circus march The Squealer. He was born in Massieville, Ohio and grew up in Coalton, Ohio. He took up his father's profession as a photographer and later became an interior decorator. He briefly performed in a circus band and in the National Guard, playing cornet and alto horn. His earliest works were published during the Spanish–American War with a later spurt of activity around World War I. After the later war, he settled down in Chillicothe, Ohio where he led an Odd Fellows band until his death in 1942.

The exact number of compositions written by Will Huff is uncertain, partly due to his association with Henry Fillmore. Fillmore used the named "Will Huff" as a pseudonym for several years, unaware that another composer living in the same state was also composing band music under that name. The two men met later in their lives and Fillmore's publishing company published many of the real Will Huff's compositions.
