= John Clifford Heed =

American composer and musician

"Regimental Pride"
1905's "Regimental Pride" was named by Heed in honor of his time with Voss's First Regiment Band.

"In Storm and Sunshine"
"In Storm and Sunshine", performed by the United States Navy Band in 2006.

John Clifford Heed (April 23, 1862 – February 12, 1908) was an American composer and musician. Heed's best known works include the marches In Storm and Sunshine, Regimental Pride, Metronome Prize, Clipper, The Rouser, and General Miles.

Heed was born in Hackettstown, New Jersey, on April 23, 1862. When he was 17, he became director of the George Harrick Band in Providence, Rhode Island. Heed was a cornetist for Voss's First Regimental Band in the 1890s before contracting tuberculosis and died in Newark, New Jersey on February 12, 1908. He was buried in Union Cemetery in Hackettstown, New Jersey.

His original cornet is held by the Hackettstown Historical Society Museum and is on loan from Heed’s family.

Heed's best known works include the marches In Storm and Sunshine, Regimental Pride, Metronome Prize, Clipper, The Rouser, and General Miles. He also composed polkas, waltzes, orchestral works, and pieces for cornet and piano.
