= Karl L. King =

American composer and conductor (1891–1971)

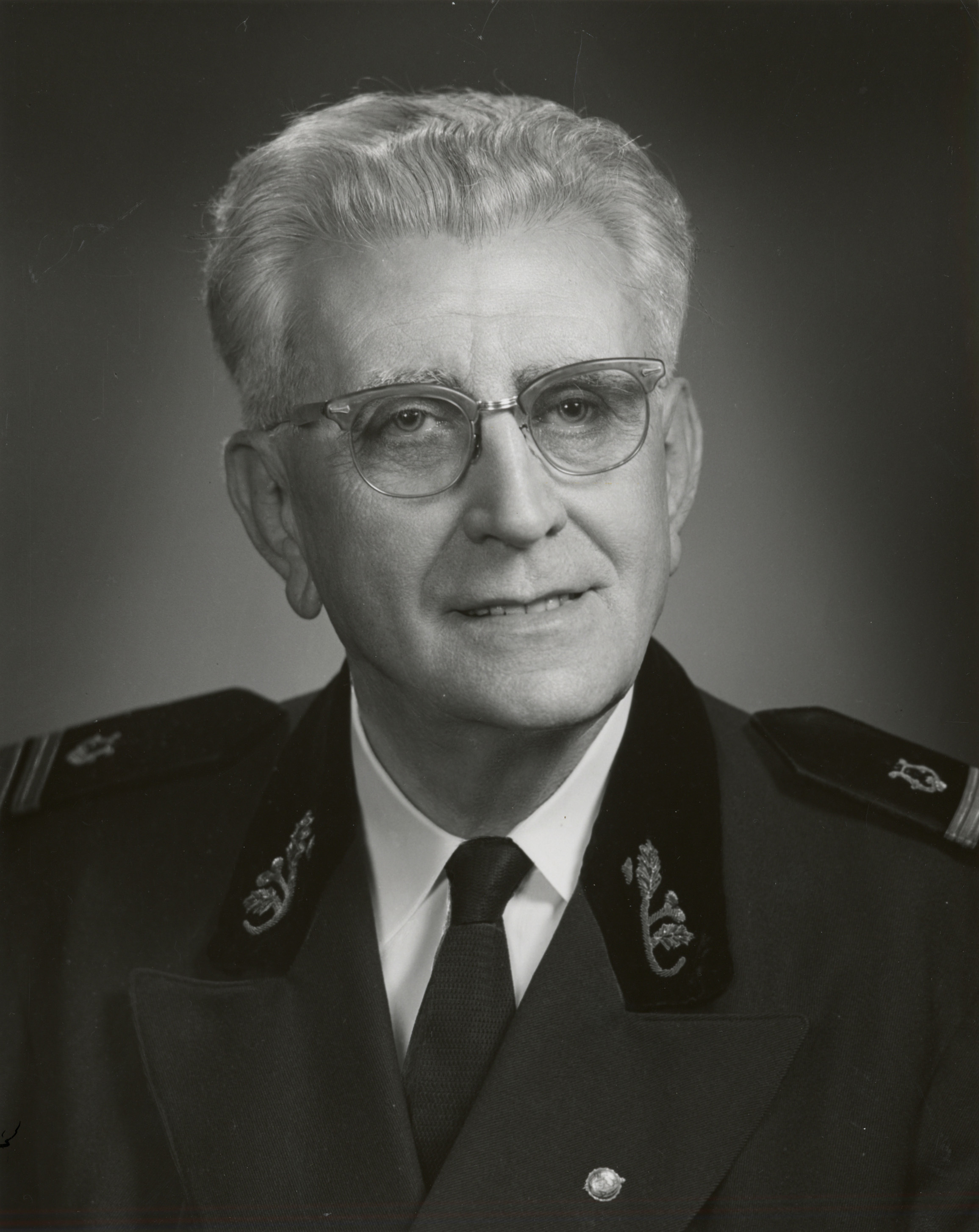
Portrait of Karl L. King.

Karl L. King (February 21, 1891 – March 31, 1971) was a United States march music bandmaster and composer. He is best known as the composer of "Barnum and Bailey's Favorite".

== Early life ==
Karl Lawrence King was born in the village of Paintersville, Ohio. He was the only child of Sandusky S. and Anna Lindsey King. The King family moved to Canton, Ohio, when he was eleven, the age he used newspaper carrier income to purchase his first musical instrument – a cornet. He studied with Emile Reinkendorff, director of the Grand Army Band of Canton, on this instrument.

He grew up as a self-taught musician with very little schooling of any kind (he left school after the eighth grade, age fourteen). His only music instruction included assistance from local musicians when he played brass instruments in the Canton Marine Band. He also had four piano lessons and one harmony lesson from musical show director William Bradford. He learned to compose by studying scores. He quit school to learn the printing trade (while composing music at night), but soon switched to playing in and composing for bands.

His first professional positions were in the Thayer Military Band in Canton, directed by William E. Strassner followed by the Neddermeyer Band of Columbus, Ohio, conducted by Fred Neddermeyer. He switched from the cornet to the baritone horn, with Strassner instructing him on that instrument. He also played in the Soldier's Home Band in Danville, Illinois.

== Circus band trouping 1910–1918 ==
In 1910 at the age of 19, he began a short career playing baritone in and directing circus bands. That year, he joined the Robinson Famous Shows under conductor Woodring Van Anda ("Woody Van"). The next year he was performing in the Yankee Robinson Circus band under Theo. Stout. In 1912, he performed in the Sells-Floto Circus under W.P. English (a famous march composer), and in 1913 in the Barnum and Bailey band under Ned Brill. At the request of Brill he wrote (and dedicated to Brill) "Barnum & Bailey's Favorite", his most famous march and possibly the most recognizable American music written specifically for the circus. It would soon be adopted as the theme of the circus.

His first full-time conducting job was in 1914 through 1915 with the Sells Floto Circus and Buffalo Bill's Wild West Show combined shows band. He became bandmaster for the Sells-Floto Circus in 1915 and was bandmaster of the Barnum and Bailey Circus band 1917–1918. In his final band, he included his wife Ruth (Lovett) as the calliope performer. He had married Ruth November 17, 1916.

In an interview in the last year of his life, King stated that his proudest moment was conducting the Barnum and Bailey band in Madison Square Garden.

== Life after circus bands ==
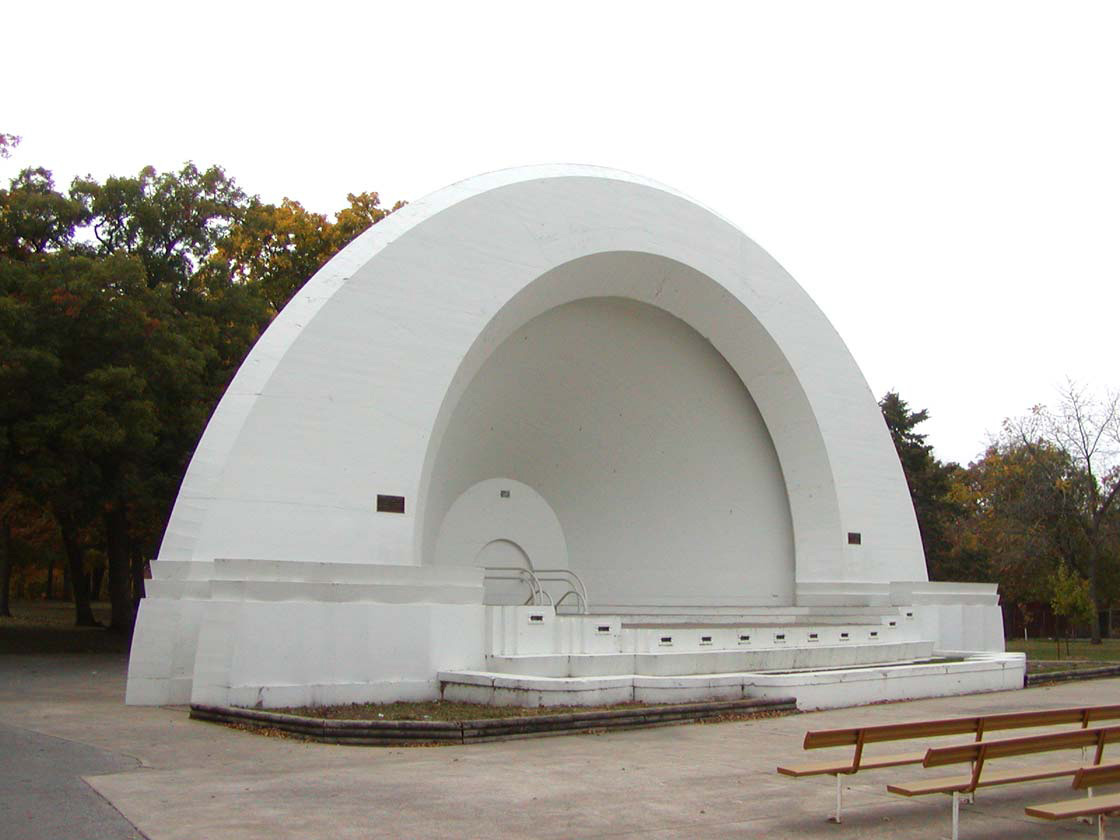
Oleson Park Music Pavilion, Fort Dodge, Iowa, which King considered his home base.

King hoped to join John Philip Sousa at the Great Lakes Naval Training Station during World War I. With no openings on his staff at the time, Sousa suggested King apply to the army as bandmaster at Camp Grant. The war ended on his reporting date so King did not serve on active duty.

King remained in Canton as director of the local band. He began a music publishing business, the K.L. King Music House in 1919, the same year his only child Karl L. King, Jr. was born. The first publication of his new music company was "Broadway One-Step".

After a year in Canton where he directed the Grand Army Band (1919) King settled down in Fort Dodge, Iowa. This was in 1920 (age 29) and for the next fifty-one years he conducted the Fort Dodge Municipal Band, which featured future American Bandmasters Association president Joseph Hermann on clarinet. The band became known as King's Band.

King was instrumental in the passage of the Iowa Band Law in 1921, which allowed cities to levy a local tax for maintenance of a band. He commemorated this with one of his marches, "Iowa Band Law". In 1960, King would direct "Iowa Band Law" with the largest mass band ever assembled: 188 high school bands and nearly 13,000 musicians at a nationally televised University of Michigan football game.

He was given a testimonial dinner for 250 people in 1951 at the age of 59 where band directors including Glenn Cliffe Bainum, Albert Austin Harding, Paul V. Yoder, and William H. Santelmann attended (as well as William S. Beardsley, the governor of Iowa). BBC

King died on March 31, 1971, of acute diverticulitis at age 80 in a Fort Dodge, Iowa hospital. He and his wife Ruth I. (Lovett) King (June 10, 1898 – July 4, 1988) are buried at North Lawn Cemetery. Their only son Karl L. King, Jr. was born in 1919 and died November 19, 1987.

A physical description of Karl King in the 1951 Who's Who in Music: brown eyes, brown hair, 6’1” in height, 200 pounds.

== Compositions ==
"The Melody Shop"
Karl L. King's "The Melody Shop" was written in 1910 at the beginning of King's career.

King the composer published more than 300 works: galops, waltzes, overtures, serenades, rags, and 188 marches and screamers. It could be said that King did for the circus march what Sousa did for the patriotic march. He seemed to like composing under pressure and often composed in tight spots (such as by oil lamp in cramped circus tents). His name appeared on the sheet music as Karl King, K. L. King, and sometimes Carl Lawrence.

His first known composition still extant was composed for the Thayer Military Band while he was performing it in – titled "March T.M.B." (1909). His first copyrighted work was "Moonlight on the Nile Waltz" (also 1909).

King's marches for circus bands are usually composed at a high difficulty level (grade 4–5 typically) American march music. He also contributed greatly to the school band movement with numerous compositions at various levels of difficulty.

In 1910 he wrote the march "The Melody Shop", created in E♭ with its trio section changing keys to the subdominant A♭ as is typical for marches and polkas. It is named after powell music company commonly known as "melody shop" from his hometown of Canton, Ohio. Excerpts of the march are commonly used in auditions for euphoniums and baritone horns auditioning for a spot in a military band, a university band, brass bands, and city and state ensembles. King released this march in 1910. This was King's first year as a circus musician.

"Barnum and Bailey's Favorite" (1913) remains his best-known composition, but other pieces that retain their popularity among fans of band music include:

- "Aces of the Air" (1942)
- "Allied Honor" (1955)
- "Attorney General" (1921)
- "The Big Cage" (1934)
- "Big Four" (1955)
- "Bolivar" (1918)
- "Broadway One-Step" (1919)
- "Bunker Hill" (1943)
- "Burma Patrol" (1942)
- "Carrollton" (1909)
- "Circus Days" (1944)
- "Cyrus The Great" (1921)
- "The Desert Patrol" (1934)
- "Diamond Jubilee March” (1961, a composite of seven of King’s most famous marches)
- "Emblem of Freedom" (1910)
- "Fidelity" (1912)
- "Flying Cadets" (1942)
- "Freedom City" (1955)
- "Gallant Marines" (1942)
- "Garland Entrée" (1912)
- "General Lee" (1943)
- "Glorious America" (1955)
- "The Golden Dragon" (1917)
- "Homestretch Gallop" (1912)
- "Hosts of Freedom" (1920)
- "Invictus" (1921)
- ”Iowa Band Law” (1921)
- ”Iowa Centennial March” (1946)
- "Kentucky Sunrise" (1919)
- "Liberty Fleet" (1942)
- "Lt. Commander" (1934)
- "March Ponderoso" (1910)
- "The Melody Shop" (1910)
- "Miss Liberty March" (1955)
- "Mystic Call" (1913)
- "The New Madison Square Garden" (1926)
- "The New Corn Palace" (1921)
- "Night Flight" (1942)
- "Pan American" (1942)
- "Peacemaker" (1955)
- "Pride of the Illini" (1928, written for University of Illinois)
- "The Purple Pageant" (1933, written for Northwestern University)
- "Ragged Rozey" (1913)
- "Robinson's Grand Entrée" (1911)
- "Rough Riders" (1943)
- "The Royal Scotch Highlanders" (1919)
- "Sarasota" (1918)
- "The Trombone King" (1945)
- "United Nations" (1942)
- "The University of North Dakota" (1935)
- "Valley Forge" (1943)
- "The Viking March" (1911, later used to create Indiana University's fight song, "Indiana, Our Indiana")
- "The Walking Frog" (1919)
- "War March of the Tartars" (1938, written for Wayne State University)
- "Woody Van's" (1911)

King's final published march was "The Home Town Boy March" (1962) dedicated to Meredith Willson.

King's publishers included J. E. Agnew, C.L. Barnhouse, Fillmore Brothers, Kalmus, Rubank Inc., R. F. Seitz, William E. Strassner, and Volkwein Brothers Inc. as well as his own publishing company Karl L. King Music House.

A disastrous fire on January 12, 1971, destroyed the Knights of Columbus Hall where the Fort Dodge Band held rehearsals and stored instruments and uniforms. The hall also held most of Karl King's original manuscripts, including special arrangements.

== Awards and honors ==
- 1929 – Elected to American Bandmasters Association
- 1953 – Honorary Doctor of Music degree from Phillips University in Enid, Oklahoma
- 1962 – Elected to the Academy of Wind and Percussion Arts
- 1962 – Karl L. King Viaduct over the Des Moines River dedicated at Fort Dodge
- 1964 – Elected to the Society of European Stage Actors and Composers
- 1967 – Kappa Kappa Psi National Honorary Band Fraternity Distinguished Service to Music Medal
- 1967–1971 – Honorary Life President American Bandmasters Association
- 1971 – Edwin Franco Goldman Award of the American School Bandmasters Association (first non-school band director to receive this award)
- 1974 – first inductee to Windjammers Unlimited (Circus Music Historical Society) Hall of Fame
- 1975 – Iowa Award given posthumously, highest award state can bestow an individual
- 1976 – Fort Dodge Band Shell renovated and named in honor of Karl King
- 1980 – National Band Association names Karl King to the Hall of Fame of Distinguished Band Conductors
- 1995 – Inducted into the Circus Ring of Fame
- 2006 – Karl King Statue dedicated in Fort Dodge
- 2023- The High School Band Directors National Association names Karl King as a pioneer of Band Education-ranking #3 of the Top 20 Band Directors in history.

== Discography ==
The following is selective. Note that the volumes in the Heritage of the March series are typically half filled with King marches.

- Circus Spectacular: The Band Music of K.L. King. Circus Band, Matthew H. Phillips. CD: Vox 7541.
- Golden Age of the March – Volume 1. (includes 12 of King's marches) The Washington Winds, Edward Petersen. CD: Walking Frog Records WFR 101.
- Heritage of the March LPs: volumes 25, L, N, R, CC, DD, NN, QQ, RR, SS, TT, YY, HHH, III, QQQ, XXX, ZZZ, FFFF, and GGGG.
- The Music of Karl King. University of Illinois Symphonic Band, Harry Begian. LP: Golden Crest CRS 1096.
- Salute to Karl King. Band of Her Majesty’s Life Guards, W. Jackson. LP: Philips SBL 7925.
- Barnum & Bailey’s Favorite: The Music of Karl L. King. Virginia Grand Military Band, Loras J. Schissel. CD: Walking Frog Records WFR338.
- Tradition: Legacy of the March Composer Series Karl L. King. Texas A&M University Bands, Timothy Rhea. CD: Mark Masters 7267-MCD.
