= Entrance of the Gladiators =

Military march by Julius Fučík

"Entrance of the Gladiators"
"Entrance of the Gladiators", performed by the United States Marine Band

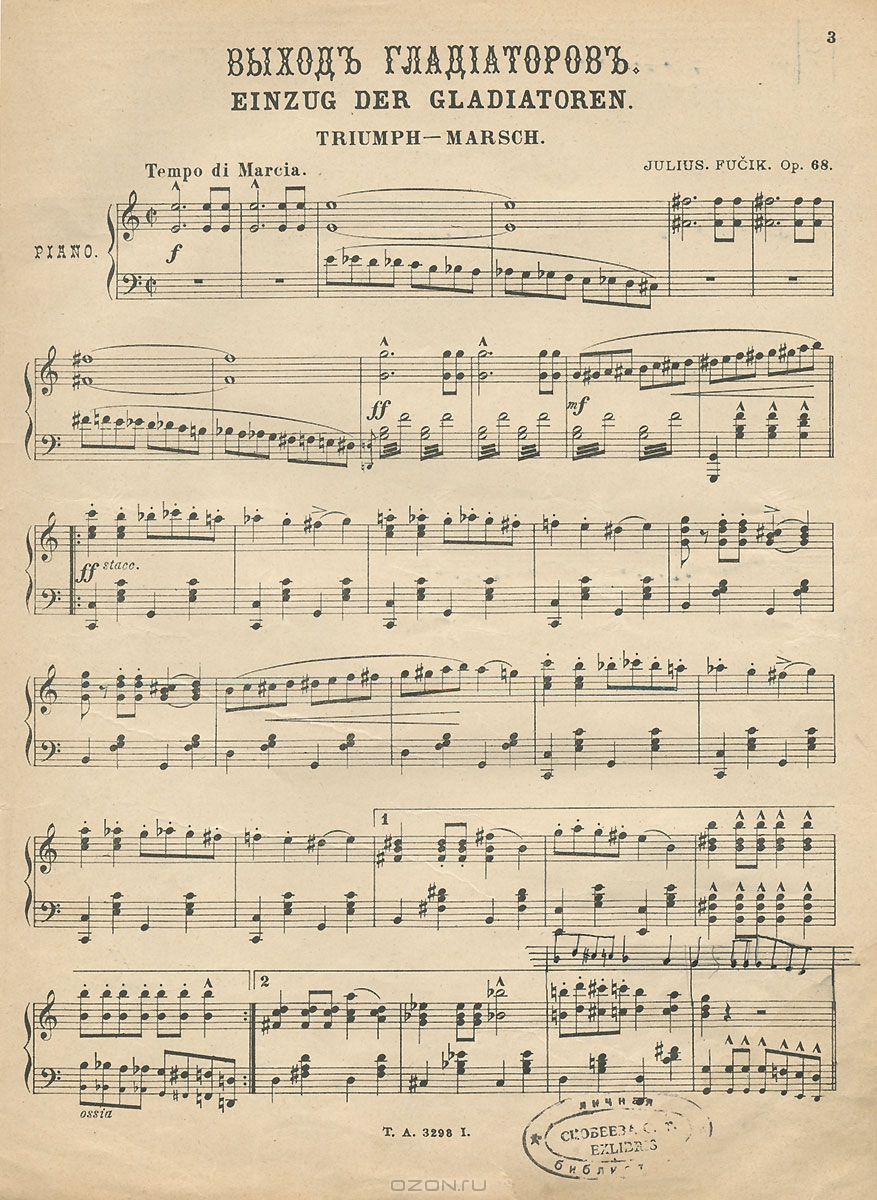
The score in an 1897 piano reduction

"Entrance of the Gladiators" op. 68 or "Entry of the Gladiators" (Czech: Vjezd gladiátorů) (German: Einzug der Gladiatoren) is a military march composed in 1897 by the Czech composer Julius Fučík. He originally titled it "Grande Marche Chromatique", reflecting the use of chromatic scales throughout the piece, but changed the title based on his personal interest in Roman gladiators from Henry Sienkiewicz's book Quo Vadis? [Whither Goest Thou?]. The march is subtitled "Triumph-Marsch".

Generally, the march is divided into three parts. The first part contains the melody that the trumpet keeps and the several supporting parts. The second part is the section where the low brass (mainly the tubas) take over with the chromatic scale-like role. Finally, there is a trio, or a softer melodic section, where there is a strong balance between woodwinds and low brass. The trio has a part similar to the second part with a chromatic scale-like sound. The piece is written in cut time and is originally written to be played at standard march tempo, but when played as a screamer it is usually played much faster.

Today it is best known for its association with circuses and traveling carnivals.

== History ==
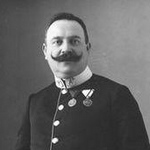
Composer Julius Fučík

Czech composer Julius Fučík wrote the march on October 17, 1897, in Sarajevo, where he had been stationed as military bandmaster of the Austro-Hungarian Army since 1897. Originally, Fučík called the piece "Grande Marche Chromatique". The march demonstrates the state of the art in playing technology and the construction of brass instruments, which allowed fast and even chromatic gears in all instruments and positions. Fučík was so impressed by the description of a gladiator appearance in a Roman amphitheater in Henryk Sienkiewicz's 1895 novel Quo Vadis that he soon changed the title of his work. The phrase "entry of the gladiators" is known in two descriptions of Pompeii in 1877 and is probably older.

On January 10, 1900, Kapellmeister Anton Fridrich (1849–1924, known for composing the regimental march "Khevenhüller-Marsch") created an arrangement for string orchestra for himself in Graz. Six months later, the "Concert March for large orchestra", published in Prague by the sheet music printing house Hoffmanns Witwe, is listed under the title "Einzug der Gladiatoren" by Hofmeister. Further edits followed. In 1903, one of the Coldstream Guard Band's pre-recorded clay roller advertised by Columbia Records titled "Entry of the Gladiators". That same year, a piano score with the title "Entry of the Gladiators / Thunder and Blazes" (German: "Donner und Feuersbrünste") was released. The phrase "Entrance of the Gladiators", which has existed since at least the 18th century, is also common in English.

Hermann Ludwig Blankenburg published his "Farewell to the Gladiators" at the latest in 1904. In 1928, both pieces were recorded by the Great Odeon Orchestra on a plate (No. 85204).

== Adaptations and uses ==
In 1901, American publisher Carl Fischer published a version of this march, arranged for American wind bands by Canadian composer Louis-Philippe Laurendeau, under the title "Thunder and Blazes". During this period, the piece gained lasting popularity as a screamer march for circuses, often used to introduce clowns. Today, it is mainly known by this association. Laurendeau's version was also transcribed for fairground organs.

In 1915, the New York Military Band recorded the march (Edison Records, 50214).

Very popular in the 1930s, the march was included as a military march in the repertoire of pieces imposed by the SS on prisoners' orchestras to accompany the departures and returns of the work Kommandos in German concentration camps.

The first portion of the piece has been quoted in such songs as "Goodbye, Cruel World" (1961) by James Darren; "Palisades Park" (1962) by Freddy Cannon; "Yakety Sax" (1963) by Boots Randolph; "Tight Rope" (1972) by Leon Russell; "Your Sister Can't Twist (but She Can Rock 'n Roll) (1973) by Elton John; "The Show Must Go On" (1973) by Leo Sayer, covered by Three Dog Night (1974); "Mr. Soft" by Cockney Rebel (1974); "Sideshow" (1974) by Blue Magic; "Carnival of Sorts" (1982) by R.E.M.; "Esther" (1989) by Phish; "Universal Mind" (1998) by Liquid Tension Experiment; "Tu Wa Ga Pat" (2000) by Project Pop; "Don't Get It Twisted" (2006) by Gwen Stefani; "Circus" (2022) by Stray Kids; and "Freak" (2022) by Demi Lovato. It is used in Nino Rota's score for Federico Fellini's film La Dolce Vita (1960). In the film version of Godspell (1973), Judas hums it when he begins his betrayal and crucifixion of Jesus. (In that adaptation, Jesus and all the disciples are dressed and made up as clowns.) In Madagascar 3: Europe's Most Wanted (2012), Marty the Zebra while dressed in clown makeup dances and sings a parody version, popularly known as "Afro Circus". It is also briefly used in the video game Deltarune (2025), specifically as a short gag during the game show segment of Chapter 3. Also, this used in the video game Pizza Tower in the music named "Pizza Pie-ing".

It was used for many decades by the English rugby league team, Wigan Warriors. Used from at least the 1950s as a walk-out song, all the way up the 1990s, with it sometimes still being used to this day.

The march was used as main theme in horror movie "Killer Klowns from Outer Space" (1988).

The march receives the occasional concert hall performance, such as at the 2007 Last Night of the Proms.

== See also ==
- Circus music
- Clowns
- Juggling
