= Merle Evans =

American circus bandmaster and cornetist (1891–1987)

- Born: Merle Slease Evans; December 26, 1891; Columbus, Kansas
- Died: December 31, 1987 (aged 96); Sarasota, Florida

Merle Slease Evans (December 26, 1891 – December 31, 1987) was an American cornet player and circus band conductor who conducted the Ringling Bros. and Barnum & Bailey Circus for fifty years. He was known as the "Toscanini of the Big Top." Evans was inducted into the American Bandmasters Association in 1947 and the International Circus Hall of Fame in 1975.

== Early life ==
Merle Slease Evans was born in Columbus, Kansas on December 26, 1891. His father was a foreman in a coal mine. He had six siblings. Evans had an early job selling newspapers on corners. He used his cornet to call attention to the headlines. He is featured in Tom Rhoads' farcical history of Columbus. After holding several other jobs, Evans left home and joined the S.W. Brundage us Carnival Company as a cornet player. Evans held several other jobs, including as a band director for the Miller Brothers 101 Ranch Wild West Show featuring Buffalo Bill.

== Ringling Bros. and Barnum & Bailey Circus ==
Evans was hired as the band director for the newly merged Ringling Bros. and Barnum & Bailey Circus in 1919. Evans held this job for fifty years, until his retirement in 1969. He only missed performances due to a musicians union strike in 1942 and the death of his first wife. He wrote eight circus marches, including Symphonia and Fredella.

=== Hartford Circus Fire ===
On July 6, 1944, a fire broke out during a Ringling Bros. and Barnum and Bailey Circus performance. The fire killed around 168 people. The quick reaction of Evans and his band is credited with saving thousands of lives. When Evans saw the fire, he signaled that the band should play John Philip Sousa’s “Stars and Stripes Forever,” used in the circus and theater industries as the “disaster march,” indicating an emergency. The performers heard the music and immediately began the evacuation. Accounts state that Evans and his band played until it was no longer safe to do so, and then evacuated and reformed outside, where their playing helped to pace the evacuation and steady the crowd.

== Personal life, retirement and death ==
After his retirement, Evans continued to live an active life. He served as a director of the Columbus State Bank in his hometown of Columbus, Kansas. He gave workshops and guest-led bands around the country. His second wife was Nena, who served as secretary to the owners and executives of the Ringling Bros. and Barnum & Bailey circus. Evans died in Sarasota, Florida on December 31, 1987.

== Memorials ==
A scholarship at the Indiana University Bloomington Jacobs School of Music is named after Evans. The scholarship supports students with aspirations towards concert bands. The Midwest Clinic awarded Evans its Medal of Honor in 1966. Windjammers Unlimited credits Evans with its early success as an organization, and he is honored in their Hall of Fame.
