= Barnum and Bailey's Favorite =

1913 circus march written by Karl King

"Barnum and Bailey's Favorite" is a circus march written by Karl King for the circus of the same name in 1913.

== Composition of the march ==
"Barnum and Bailey's Favorite", often referred to as "The Granddaddy of Circus Marches", was composed by Karl King in 1913 and was published through C. L. Barnhouse Company. King's earliest known compositions date from 1909 with this, his most famous work, being composed in only his fifth year of composing.

King played Baritone horn in many circus bands including Barnum and Bailey's, for more than a decade. As is common in his compositions, Karl King made the baritone part a major voice in the march.

King was asked by the bandmaster of the Barnum and Bailey Circus Ned Brill to write a march for the circus. This has become his most famous composition, being called "the finest work written to celebrate 'The Greatest Show on Earth'" and is one of the most recognizable marches of all time.

== Structure of the march ==
The composition is largely a standard march consisting of an introduction, a first strain, second strain, trio and a break strain. The intro, first strain and second strain are all in the key of concert A♭ and the piece is written in cut time. The tempo may range 120 to 160 beats per minute. The introduction lasts eight measures with the ensemble playing three chords of A♭, then D♭ minor second-inversion with concert F♭ in the bass voices and then another A♭ chord second-inversion with the basses having a concert E♭. The cornets/ trumpets fanfare the next four measures as the basses play counter melody play juxtaposed into the first strain. The first strain has the upper woodwinds, high brass and euphonium playing an eighth note melody as the band swells in dynamics before reaching the end of the strain with more trumpet and euphonium fanfare. In the second strain, the melody starts out in the low winds and brass in a loud and quick fury of notes in a passage in F minor. This is traded off to the high voices in a softer running melody as the euphoniums play a running counter melody. This repeats itself with the trombones and tubas joining the euphoniums in their theme to the end of the strain.

The trio begins with another introduction that has the high and middle voices playing chords in tied half notes and whole notes as the lower choir plays a little passage of quarter notes. Like almost all major key marches, it adds one more flat and is now in the key of concert D♭ Major. The melody for the trio is in the flutes, first clarinet, first trumpet, tenor saxophones, and euphonium and is played at a dynamic of piano. The main melody of the trio is repeated with no other voices changing; the portion is repeated at a softer dynamic once more. Much like the second strain, the break strain transitions strongly into its melody from the second strain only this time it is in B♭ minor and repeats the passage one whole step down. The last few measures of the break strain jump down from fortissimo to mezzo-forte and builds back up with eighth notes being passed back and forth between the upper voices and the euphoniums and tenor saxes until the end of the crescendo is reached. The third time through the trio melody, the euphoniums and upper woodwinds play small passages of eighth notes in a counter melody to the established melody in the cornets, trombones, and first bassoons. The section repeats one more time from the break strain and the collective ensemble finishes the piece in a homogenized fortissimo ending.
