= Henry Fillmore =

American composer (1881–1956)

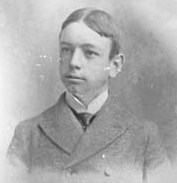
- Fillmore in the 1890s, at the age of 16.
- Born: December 3, 1881; Cincinnati, Ohio, U.S.
- Died: December 7, 1956 (aged 75); Miami, Florida, U.S.
- Education: Cincinnati Conservatory of Music
- Occupations: Composer, musician, bandleader
- Spouse: Mabel May Jones

Henry Fillmore (December 3, 1881 – December 7, 1956) was an American musician, composer, publisher, and bandleader, best known for his many marches and screamers, a few of which he wrote for the Band of the Hour at the University of Miami in Coral Gables, Florida.

== Early life and education ==
Fillmore was born in Cincinnati, Ohio as the eldest of five children. In his youth, he mastered piano, guitar, violin, flute, and slide trombone. He kept his trombone activities a secret at first, as his circumspect religious father James Henry Fillmore (1849–1936)—a composer of gospel songs, often in collaboration with Jessie Brown Pounds—believed it an uncouth and sinful instrument. Henry's mother secretly bought a used trombone for him and obscured from Henry's father the son's learning to play the instrument. Fillmore, whose uncle, Frederick A. Fillmore (1856–1925) was also a tune-composer for gospel songs, was a singer for his church choir as a boy. He began composing at 18, with his first published march "Hingham", named after a line of brass instruments.

Fillmore attended the Miami Military Institute in Germantown, Ohio from 1899 to 1901, and then entered the Cincinnati Conservatory of Music in 1901.

== Personal life ==
After graduating from the Cincinnati Conservatory of Music, Fillmore traveled the United States as a circus bandmaster with his wife, an exotic vaudeville dancer named Mabel May Jones. They were married in St. Louis.

== Career ==
During the 1920s, Fillmore was back in Cincinnati conducting the Shriners Temple Band, which he turned into one of the best marching bands in the country. After the death of John Philip Sousa in 1932, he was often called "The March King".

=== Fillmore Music House ===
The Fillmore Music House was co-founded in 1874 by his father, James Fillmore, and his uncle, Frederick Fillmore, under the "Fillmore Brothers" name, which began as a Cincinnati-based hymnal publisher. When Henry Fillmore became president after his father's death in 1937, he transformed the firm to focus on orchestral and band music, along with musical instrument sales. In 1951, he announced the Fillmore Music Shop would become an affiliate of Carl Fischer Music of New York, with the condition that it would still operate under the Fillmore name and that all thirteen employees would continue in their employment at the store's 528 Elm Street location.

=== Florida band work ===
In 1938, Fillmore, after being advised by a physician that he had just a few months to live, retired to Miami, Florida. He went on, however, to prove the physician wrong, keeping an active schedule rehearsing high school bands in Florida and composing marches. The Henry Fillmore Band Hall, the rehearsal hall for many of the University of Miami's performing groups, acquired its name as a tribute to Fillmore's work in the band genre. The hall houses the Fillmore Museum. His march "Orange Bowl" was written for Miami's Band of the Hour. Uncle Henry, as Fillmore was affectionately known to the members of the Band of the Hour, also wrote the University of Miami's current official fight song – "Miami U How-De-Doo". His arrangement of "The Star-Spangled Banner" is performed by the Florida State University Marching Chiefs. His march "Men of Florida" was composed for the bands at the University of Florida. He was given an Honorary Doctorate of Music by the University of Miami in 1956 in recognition of his career. Fillmore lived out the rest of his days in South Florida.

=== Music ===
"Troopers Tribunal" (1905)
Fillmore's "Troopers Tribunal", a circus march in which Fillmore used a punning name – it actually refers to troupers, as in a circus troupe – in order to conceal whom he wrote the march for from his conservative father.

"The Circus Bee"
Fillmore's "The Circus Bee" performed by the United States Marine Corps Band

"Rolling Thunder"
Fillmore's "Rolling Thunder" performed by the Ceremonial Brass of the United States Air Force.

"The Man of the Hour" (1924)
Fillmore's 1924 march "The Man of the Hour", performed here by U.S. Marine Band.

Fillmore wrote over 250 pieces and arranged orchestrations for hundreds more. He published under a variety of pseudonyms, including Gus Beans, Harold Bennett, Ray Hall, Harry Hartley, Al Hayes, and Henrietta Moore. Only the name Will Huff caused any issues, as another Will Huff composed marches and resided in Fillmore's state. Fillmore used many pseudonyms throughout his career and was worried that flooding the market with music published under "Henry Fillmore" would dissuade others from purchasing his music. His pseudonyms are associate with grade, or difficulty level, or genre. In a 1953 interview with Jack H. Mahan, Fillmore explained his pseudonym uses: "Harold Bennett" was easy and non-progressive, if you can play one, you can play them all. "Al Hayes" was a little more difficult. "Will Huff" was a duplicate composer (Fillmore's "Will Huff" was usually easy grade). "Henry Fillmore" could be the easiest marches or the most difficult. "Harry Hartley" are all solos; cornet, trombone, and baritone that are easy grade with no triple-tonguing or cadenzas. Solos under other names are just incidental. "Henrietta Moore" is all twilight songs.

A musical trade journal explained matters similarly in 1928: “The Harold Bennett Group includes selections for various instruments covering a specific range and not too difficult. The Al Hayes group is written for the same instruments, but with a more difficult arrangement; the Harry Hartley group is mostly teachers’ solos; and the Ray Hall group interesting miscellaneous compositions. Under his own name Mr. Fillmore has written many trombone solos and marches.”

While best known for march music and screamers, he also wrote waltzes, foxtrots, hymns, novelty numbers, and overtures. Fillmore's best-known compositions include:

- "The President's March" (1956)
- "The Footlifter" (1935)
- "Americans We" (1929)
- "Men of Ohio" (1921)
- "The Man of the Hour" (1924)
- "His Honor" (1934)
- "The Klaxon" (1930)
- "Lassus Trombone" (1915)
- "(We're) Men of Florida"
- "Military Escort" (1923)
- "Mt. Healthy" (1916)
- "The Crosley March"
- "Noble Men" (1922)
- "Orange Bowl March" (1939)
- "Rolling Thunder" (1916)
- "The Circus Bee" (1908)
- "King Karl King" (1957)

Fillmore gained fame as the "Father of the Trombone Smear", writing a series of 15 novelty tunes featuring trombone smears called "The Trombone Family". A number of these have a strong ragtime influence. "The Trombone Family" has a disturbing origin, however. It's steeped in the racial stereotypes of the minstrel era. Indeed, Fillmore's advertising to sell the pieces in the early 20th century uses Black caricatures in various ways to sell his music to white audiences. As such, groups are now beginning to retire "The Trombone Family" from performance. All of Fillmore's trombone rags are as follows:

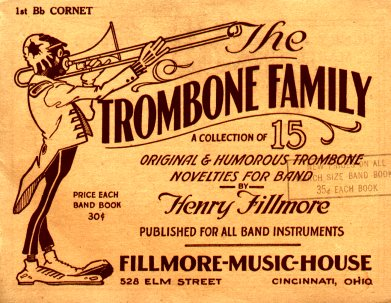
Music to Fillmore's popular "Trombone Family" series

- "Miss Trombone (A Slippery Rag)" (1908)
- "Teddy Trombone (A Brother to Miss Trombone)" (1911)
- "Lassus Trombone (De Cullud Valet to Miss Trombone)" (1915)
- "Pahson Trombone (Lassus Trombone's 'Ole Man')" (1916)
- "Sally Trombone (Pahson Trombone's Eldest Gal Some Crow)" (1917)
- "Slim Trombone (Sally Trombone's Cousin - the Jazzin' One Step Kid)" (1918)
- "Mose Trombone (He's Slim Trombone's Buddy)" (1919)
- "Shoutin' Liza Trombone (Mose Trombone's Ah-finity)" (1920) (Also known as "Hallelujah Trombone" for the quote from Handel's "Messiah")
- "Hot Trombone (He's Jes a Fren' ob Shoutin' Liza Trombone)" (1921)
- "Bones Trombone (He's Jes as Warm as Hot Trombone)" (1922)
- "Dusty Trombone" (1923)
- "Bull Trombone (A Cullud Toreador)" (1924)
- "Lucky Trombone" (1926)
- "Boss Trombone" (1929)
- "Ham Trombone" (1929)

Occasionally, as in "The Footlifter" credit, Fillmore wrote with the name Harold Bennett.
