= List of shipwrecks in June 1835 =

The list of shipwrecks in June 1835 includes ships sunk, foundered, wrecked, grounded or otherwise lost during June 1835.

== 1 June ==
List of shipwrecks: 1 June 1835
Ship	State	Description
Assiniboine	United States	The steamboat burned on the Missouri River on the western border of the Michigan Territory near what later became Bismarck, North Dakota.

== 2 June ==
List of shipwrecks: 2 June 1835
Ship	State	Description
Camilla	United Kingdom	The ship departed from the Bay of Bengal for Calcutta, India, no further trace, presumed foundered with the loss of all hands.

== 8 June ==
List of shipwrecks: 8 June 1835
Ship	State	Description
No. 25	Imperial Russian Navy	The ship was driven ashore and wrecked between Cape Tammikonniemi (60.233256°N 28.974753°E) and Maly Peninsula (60.250485°N 28.954754°E) on the eastern coast of the Gulf of Finland. She was on a voyage from Kronstadt to Sveaborg.

== 9 June ==
List of shipwrecks: 9 June 1835
Ship	State	Description
Laura	United Kingdom	The ship was lost near Cape Ray, Newfoundland, British North America. She was on a voyage from Philadelphia, Pennsylvania, United States to Quebec City, Lower Canada, British North America.
Rosella	United Kingdom	The ship ran aground and was severely damaged at Arkhangelsk, Russia. She was on a voyage from Peterhead, Aberdeenshire to Arkhangelsk.

== 10 June ==
List of shipwrecks: 10 June 1835
Ship	State	Description
Cherub	United Kingdom	The ship capsized at Quebec City, Lower Canada, British North America. She was refloated on 13 June.

== 11 June ==
List of shipwrecks: 11 June 1835
Ship	State	Description
Samuel Freeman	United Kingdom	The ship was wrecked at Mispeck Point, Saint John, New Brunswick. She was on a voyage from London to Cumberland, Maryland, United States.

== 13 June ==
List of shipwrecks: 13 June 1835
Ship	State	Description
Majestic	United States	The steamship suffered a boiler explosion at Memphis, Tennessee, killing 40 people. She was on a voyage from New Orleans, Louisiana to St. Louis, Missouri.

== 14 June ==
List of shipwrecks: 14 June 1835
Ship	State	Description
Isabella (1813 ship)	United Kingdom	The whaler was wrecked by ice off the coast of Greenland. Her 25 crew were rescued by Lee (United Kingdom) on 17 June.
Montezuma	Mexican Navy	Ingham incident: The schooner was run ashore on Brazos Island, Texas, United States to prevent capture by USRC Ingham ( United States Revenue-Marine).

== 15 June ==
List of shipwrecks: 15 June 1835
Ship	State	Description
Eagle	United Kingdom	The schooner sprang a leak and foundered in the Irish Sea. Her crew were rescued by the schooner Lord Exmouth (United Kingdom). She was on a voyage from Liverpool, Lancashire to Wigton, Cumberland.
Mary Ann	United Kingdom	The ship was wrecked 30 nautical miles (56 km) east of Pictou, Nova Scotia, British North America. She was on a voyage from Pictou to London.

== 17 June ==
List of shipwrecks: 17 June 1835
Ship	State	Description
William Ewing	United Kingdom	The barque was wrecked on Scaterie Island, Nova Scotia, British North America. All on board, over 250 people, were rescued. She was on a voyage from Londonderry to Quebec City, Lower Canada, British North America.

== 18 June ==
List of shipwrecks: 18 June 1835
Ship	State	Description
La Reyna Gobernadora	Spanish Navy	First Carlist War: The frigate ran aground at Portugalete during an operation to land marines. She consequently came under attack by Carlist forces.

== 19 June ==
List of shipwrecks: 19 June 1835
Ship	State	Description
Eliza	United Kingdom	The ship was wrecked on Saaremaa, Russia. She was on a voyage from the Firth of Forth to Saint Petersburg, Russian Empire.
Helena	Norway	The ship was driven ashore and wrecked at Thisted. She was on a voyage from Papenburg, Kingdom of Hanover to a Norwegian port.

== 20 June ==
List of shipwrecks: 20 June 1835
Ship	State	Description
Ann	United Kingdom	The ship was driven ashore and severely damaged in the Saint Lawrence River.
Diana	United Kingdom	The ship was wrecked in the Saint Lawrence River.
Fortuna	United Kingdom	The ship was wrecked on Bornholm, Denmark. Her crew were rescued. She was on a voyage from Memel, Prussia to Leith, Lothian.
James	(United Kingdom of Great Britain and Ireland) British North America	The barque was wrecked in the Shag Islands, Newfoundland. Her crew were rescued. She was on a voyage from Philadelphia, Pennsylvania, United States to Quebec City, Lower Canada.
Kingston	United Kingdom	The ship was driven ashore near Quebec City.
Mars	United Kingdom	The ship was wrecked in the Saint Lawrence River.
Nathaniel	United Kingdom	The ship was driven ashore and wrecked in the Shag Islands with the loss of 41 of the 48 people on board.
William Ewing	(United Kingdom of Great Britain and Ireland) British North America	The barque was wrecked on the west coast of Scaterie Island, Nova Scotia, British North America. She had about 300 passengers on board, all of whom were rescued. She was on a voyage from Londonderry to Saint John, New Brunswick.

== 21 June ==
List of shipwrecks: 21 June 1835
Ship	State	Description
Annabella	(United Kingdom of Great Britain and Ireland) Jersey	The ship was wrecked on Green Island, Labrador, British North America. Her crew were rescued.
Ebenezer	(United Kingdom of Great Britain and Ireland) Jersey	The ship was wrecked on Green Island. Her crew were rescued.
Sir Walter Scott	United States	The ship was struck by lightning, set afire and sank in the Atlantic Ocean (31°24′N 75°43′W). All 21 people on board survived. She was on a voyage from New Orleans, Louisiana to Liverpool, Lancashire, United Kingdom.

== 22 June ==
List of shipwrecks: 22 June 1835
Ship	State	Description
Brothers and Sisters	United Kingdom	The ship caught fire and put into Peterhead, Aberdeenshire, where she was burnt down to the waterline.

== 24 June ==
List of shipwrecks: 24 June 1835
Ship	State	Description
Betsey	United Kingdom	The oyster smack was driven ashore and wrecked at Spurn Point, Yorkshire. Her three crew were rescued by the Spurn Lifeboat.
Earl of Leicester	United Kingdom	The ship was wrecked at Bearhaven, County Kerry. Her crew were rescued. She was on a voyage from Liverpool, Lancashire to Limerick.
Huron	United Kingdom	The brig was wrecked on the Horse Bank, in the Irish Sea off the mouth of the River Ribble. All on board were rescued. She was on a voyage from Liverpool, Lancashire to Pernambuco, Brazil.

== 25 June ==
List of shipwrecks: 25 June 1835
Ship	State	Description
Friendship	Kingdom of Hanover	The ship was wrecked at Robin Hood's Bay, Yorkshire, United Kingdom. Her crew were rescued. She was on a voyage from Harwich, Essex to Sunderland, County Durham, United Kingdom.
Thales	United Kingdom	The ship was driven ashore and wrecked near Whitby, Yorkshire. All fourteen people on board were rescued.

== 26 June ==
List of shipwrecks: 26 June 1835
Ship	State	Description
Ceres	United Kingdom	The ship capsized in the English Channel with the loss of all but two of her crew. Survivors were rescued by Clyde (United Kingdom). She was on a voyage from Shoreham-by-Sea, Sussex to Dundee, Forfarshire. Ceres was subsequently taken in to Ramsgate, Kent.

== 27 June ==
List of shipwrecks: 27 June 1835
Ship	State	Description
Adolf	Danzig	The ship was driven ashore and wrecked on Saltholm, Denmark. She was on a voyage from Danzig to Hull, Yorkshire, United Kingdom.

== 29 June ==
List of shipwrecks: 29 June 1835
Ship	State	Description
Adonis	United Kingdom	The ship was wrecked in the Maldive Islands. Her crew were rescued. She was on a voyage from Mauritius to China.

== 30 June ==
List of shipwrecks: 30 June 1835
Ship	State	Description
Esther	United Kingdom	The ship capsized in the Irish Sea off Great Orme Head, Caernarfonshire with the loss of four of her six crew. Survivors were rescued by the fishing smack Eagle ( (United Kingdom of Great Britain and Ireland) Isle of Man). Esther was on a voyage from Limerick to Liverpool, Lancashire.
Orion	(United Kingdom of Great Britain and Ireland) British North America	The ship was wrecked on Cape Blanch, Newfoundland with the loss of five of her crew. She was on a voyage from Newfoundland to Quebec City, Lower Canada.

== Unknown date ==
List of shipwrecks: Unknown date 1835
Ship	State	Description
Anne	United Kingdom	The brig was wrecked in the Saint Lawrence River at Rivière-Ouelle, Lower Canada, British North America before 24 June.
Diana	United Kingdom	The ship was wrecked in the Saint Lawrence River before 24 June.
George IV	United Kingdom	The ship was wrecked on "La Roque". Her crew were rescued. She was on a voyage from Liverpool, Lancashire to La Guaira, Venezuela.
Isabella	United Kingdom	The ship ran aground in the Saint Lawrence River and was wrecked before 16 June. She was on a voyage from Saint John, New Brunswick, British North America to Liverpool.
Jessie	United Kingdom	The ship foundered in the Atlantic Ocean before 10 June. Her fourteen crew took to a boat, but only three of them survived the ten days it took before they were rescued.
Kingston	United Kingdom	The full-rigged ship was wrecked in the Saint Lawrence River at Saint-Thomas, Lower Canada before 24 June.
Majestic	United Kingdom	The ship was wrecked on the White Island Reef before 26 June. She was on a voyage from Whitby, Yorkshire to Montreal, Lower Canada
Mars	United Kingdom	The ship was wrecked in the Saint Lawrence River before 24 June.
