= Semper Paratus (march) =

Official march of the United States Coast Guard

English: Always Ready
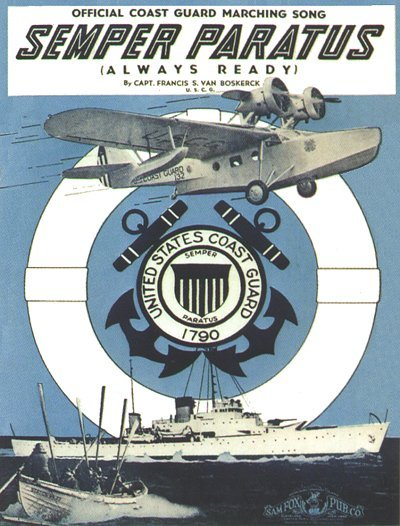
- Sheet music cover, 1928
- Organizational anthem of the United States Coast Guard
- Lyrics: Homer Smith and Walton Butterfield, 1943
- Music: Francis Saltus Van Boskerck, 1927
- Adopted: 1928; 98 years ago

Audio sample
- U.S. Coast Guard Band performing the march: file; help

"Semper Paratus" (Latin for "Always Ready") is the official song and march of the United States Coast Guard. It was composed by U.S. Coast Guard Captain Francis Saltus Van Boskerck in 1927. It made its debut in 1928.

== Etymology of title ==
Semper Paratus is the title of the song and is also the U.S. Coast Guard's official motto. The precise origin of the phrase is obscure, although the U.S. Coast Guard Historian's Office notes the first use was by the New Orleans Bee newspaper in 1836, in reference to the actions of the U.S. Revenue Cutter Service during the Ingham incident.

== History ==
=== Composition ===
The original lyrics (seen below) were written by Captain Francis Saltus Van Boskerck in 1922, at the cabin of USCGC Yamacraw in Savannah, Georgia; he wrote the music in 1927, on a "beat-up old piano" in Unalaska, Alaska.

=== First performance ===
During the run of A Girl in Every Port (1928 film) at the Fox Theater in Washington D.C., a detachment of 50 Coast Guard officers appeared at the theater for the debut of "Semper Paratus", the official song of the U.S. Coast Guard. The officers appeared at each performance during the playing of the song. Rear Admiral Frederick Billard was the Coast Guard commandant at the time.

=== Lyrical modifications ===
The current verse, as well as a second chorus, were written by Homer Smith, 3rd Naval District Coast Guard quartet; Chief Cole; and Lieutenant Walton Butterfield in 1943. In 1969, the first line of the chorus was changed from “So here's the Coast Guard marching song, We sing on land and sea.” to “We're always ready for the call, We place our trust in Thee.”

== Lyrics ==
"Semper Paratus" being performed in 1944 by the Boston Pops.

"Semper Paratus" being performed in the 1940s, during World War II.

"Semper Paratus" being played by the U.S. Navy Band in the 1990s.

"Semper Paratus" being played by the USCG Band at the 2009 U.S. presidential inauguration in Washington, D.C.

The following are lyrics to "Semper Paratus". Typically, only the first verse and the chorus are sung (occasionally only the chorus alone), at official military ceremonies, public events, and service medleys. This abbreviation is primarily practiced to accommodate strict time constraints during joint-service events and to emphasize the general rescue mission outlined in the chorus rather than the specific 19th-century naval battles detailed in the subsequent verses.

Semper Paratus
"Semper Paratus" being played by the USCG Band at a May 2010 parade in Torrance, California.

Verse 1

From Aztec Shore to Arctic Zone,
To Europe and Far East,
The Flag is carried by our ships
In times of war and peace;
And never have we struck it yet,
In spite of foemen's might,
Who cheered our crews and cheered again
For showing how to fight.

Chorus

We're always ready for the call,
We place our trust in Thee.
Through surf and storm and howling gale,
High shall our purpose be,
"Semper Paratus" is our guide,
Our fame, our glory, too.
To fight to save or fight and die!
Aye! Coast Guard, we are for you.

Verse 2

"Surveyor" and "Narcissus,"
The "Eagle" and "Dispatch,"
The "Hudson" and the "Tampa,"
These names are hard to match;
From Barrow's shores to Paraguay,
Great Lakes or Ocean's wave,
The Coast Guard fights through storms and winds
To punish or to save.

Verse 3

Aye! We've been "Always Ready"
To do, to fight, or die!
Write glory to the shield we wear
In letters to the sky.
To sink the foe or save the maimed
Our mission and our pride.
We'll carry on 'til Kingdom Come
Ideals for which we've died.

== See also ==
- "Marines' Hymn"
- "The U.S. Air Force"
- "Anchors Aweigh"
- "The Army Goes Rolling Along"
- "Semper Supra"
- "U.S. Public Health Service March"
- A Girl in Every Port (1928 film)

== Notes ==
=== Sources ===
- "History, Heritage & Traditions: Semper Paratus". Frequently Asked Questions. U.S. Coast Guard Historian's Office. Archived from the original on 30 January 2018.
- "Semper Paratus". Annotated Music. Library of Congress.
- Kroll, C. Douglas (2010). A Coast Guardsman's History of the U.S. Coast Guard. Annapolis, Maryland: U. S. Naval Institute Press. ISBN 978-1-59114-433-5.
- Loy, James M. (January 19, 1999). "The Curse of Semper Paratus" (PDF). Speech before the Military Order of the Carabao Luncheon.
