= Marines' Hymn =

Official hymn of the US Marine Corps

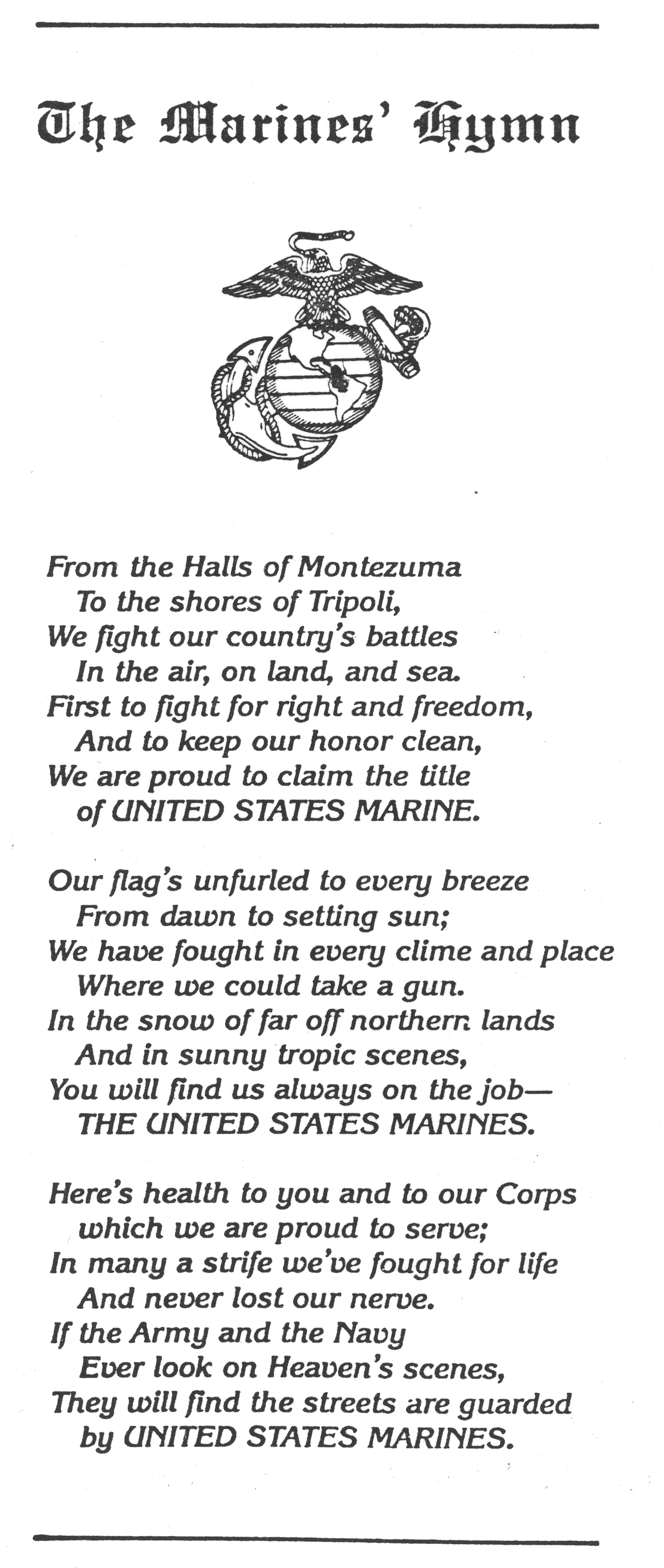
- Printed lyrics
- Organizational anthem of the U.S. Marine Corps
- Lyrics: Unknown
- Music: Jacques Offenbach, 1867 (arranged by Edward M. Van Loock, 1915) (Note: Another later arrangement from the mid-1950s by Donald R. Hunsberger is also accepted for official performances.)
- Adopted: 1929

Audio sample
- "Marines' Hymn" (instrumental): file; help

The "Marines' Hymn" is the official hymn of the United States Marine Corps, introduced by the first director of the USMC Band, Francesco Maria Scala. Its music originates from an 1867 work by Jacques Offenbach with the lyrics added by an anonymous author at an unknown time in the following years. Authorized by the commandant of the Marine Corps in 1929, it is the oldest official song in the United States Armed Forces. The "Marines' Hymn" is typically sung at the position of attention as a gesture of respect, akin to a national anthem. However, the third verse is also used as a toast during formal events, such as the birthday ball and other ceremonies.

== History ==
Instrumental sample of a single verse of the "Marines' Hymn" played by the President's Own Marine Band, arranged by Donald R. Hunsberger.

Instrumental performance of all verses of the "Marines' Hymn" played by the 2nd Marine Division Band in London, arranged by Donald R. Hunsberger.

A 2025 USMC-produced documentary about the Marines' Hymn's origins.

The line "To the shores of Tripoli" refers to the First Barbary War, and specifically the Battle of Derna in 1805. "The Halls of Montezuma" refers to the Battle of Chapultepec on 12/13 September 1847 during the Mexican–American War, where a force of Marines stormed Chapultepec Castle. Strictly, the usage "Halls of Montezuma" is poetic license, as the building which the Marines stormed had been erected by the Spanish rulers of Mexico, more than two centuries after the Aztec Emperor Montezuma was overthrown. At the time of the assault, the fort was actually the newly founded Mexican Military Academy. Prior to Mexican independence one of the Spanish viceroys had built a personal residence on the hill (1786). However, in Aztec times Chapultepec Hill and its hot springs were a royal spa.

Marine Corps tradition maintains that the red stripe worn on the dress-blues trousers of officers and noncommissioned officers, and commonly known as the blood stripe, commemorates the high number of Marine NCOs and officers killed storming the castle of Chapultepec in September 1847. As noted by the Marine Corps,

While the lyrics are said to date from the 19th century, no pre-20th century text is known. The author of the lyrics is likewise unknown. Legend has it that a Marine on duty in Mexico penned the hymn. The unknown author transposed the phrases in the motto on the Colors so that the first two lines of the Hymn would read: "From the Halls of Montezuma, to the Shores of Tripoli", favoring euphony over chronology.

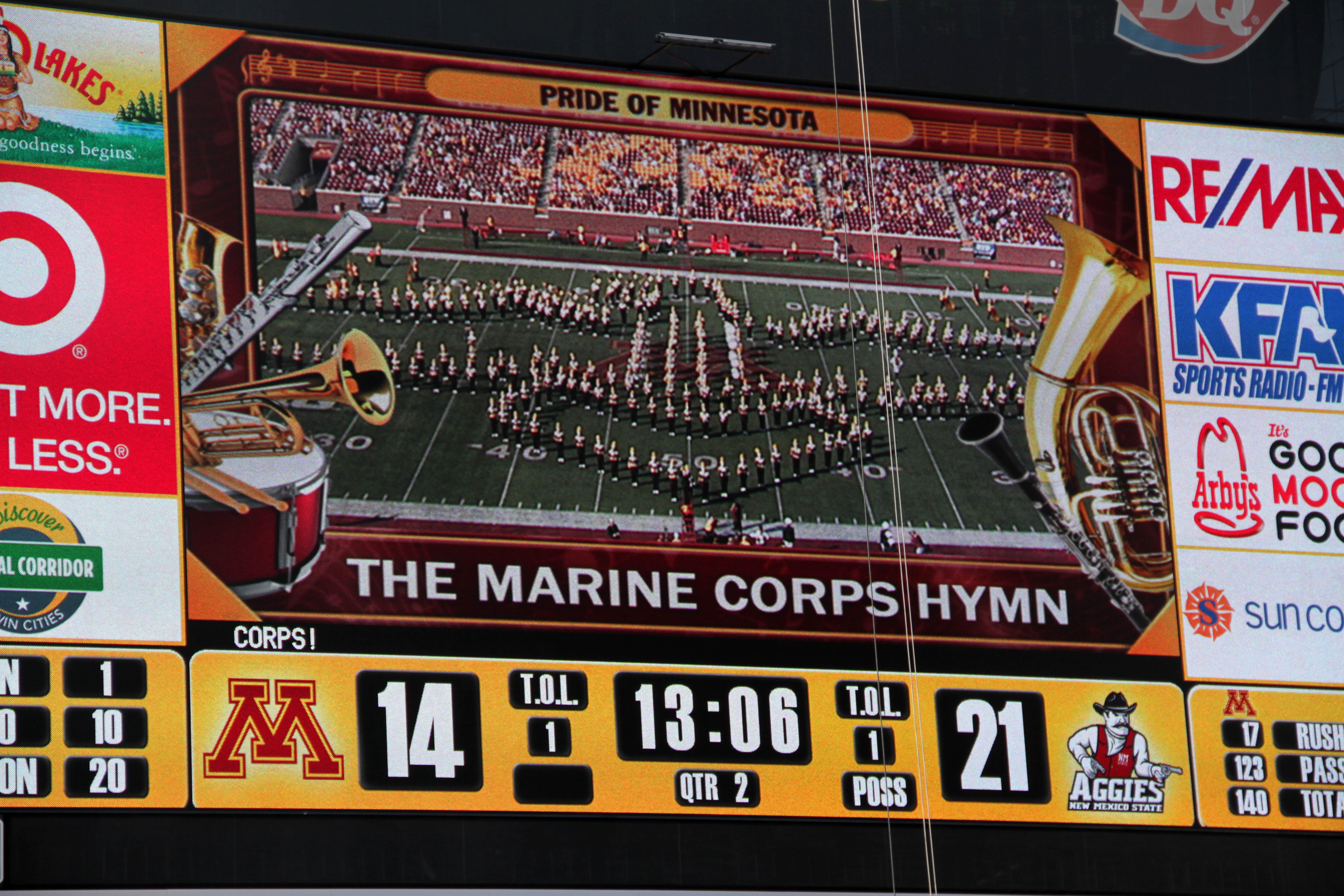
The "Marines' Hymn" being performed at the TCF Bank Stadium, Minneapolis, 2011.

The music is from the "Gendarmes' Duet" (or the "bold gendarmes") from the revision in 1867 of the Jacques Offenbach opera Geneviève de Brabant, which debuted in Paris in 1859. Correspondence between Colonel Albert S. McLemore and Walter F. Smith (the second leader of the United States Marine Band) traces the tune:

Major Richard Wallach, USMC, says that in 1878, when he was in Paris, France, the aria to which the Marines' Hymn is now sung was a very popular one.

The name of the opera and a part of the chorus was secured from Wallach and forwarded to Smith, who replied:

Major Wallach is to be congratulated upon a wonderfully accurate musical memory, for the aria of the Marine Hymn is certainly to be found in the opera Genevieve de Brabant... The melody is not in the exact form of the Marine Hymn, but is undoubtedly the aria from which it was taken. I am informed, however, by one of the members of the band, who has a Spanish wife, that the aria was one familiar to her childhood and it may, therefore, be a Spanish folk song.

John Philip Sousa once wrote:

The melody of the 'Halls of Montezuma' is taken from Offenbach's comic opera, 'Genevieve de Brabant' and is sung by two gendarmes.

Today, the preferred version officially performed by the U.S. Marine Band is a 1915 arrangement by Edward M. Van Loock, a member of the Marine Band at the time. Another later arrangement from the 1950s by Donald R. Hunsberger is also accepted for official performances.

The lyrics are also contained in the book Rhymes of the Rookies published in 1917. The author of these poems was W. E. Christian. The book is available online in several formats. It consists of a series of poems regarding military life prior to World War I.

Some websites, including the official USMC website, claim that the U.S. Marine Corps secured a copyright on the song either 19 August 1891 or 18 August 1919. U.S. Copyright Law prohibits copyrighting "any work of the United States Government", including subordinate agencies such as the Marine Corps, but allows them to hold "copyrights transferred to it by assignment, bequest, or otherwise". The Library of Congress asserts that the song was originally copyrighted in 1919 by The Leatherneck, which was started by off-duty US Marines in 1917 using a donation from the YMCA, and therefore might not be considered a "work of the United States Government". (It does not state whether Leatherneck's copyright was ever transferred to the Marine Corps.) In addition, several composers do hold copyrights on different arrangements of the song. These copyrights cover only the specific arrangements and not the song as a whole. In 1929 the commandant of the Marine Corps authorized the three verses of the Marines' Hymn as the official version, but changed the fifth through eighth lines:

Pre-1929 version	Authorized change
Admiration of the nation, we're the finest ever seen; And we glory in the title Of United States Marines.	First to fight for right and freedom And to keep our honor clean; We are proud to claim the title Of United States Marine.

This older version can be heard in the 1951 film Halls of Montezuma. On 21 November 1942, Commandant Thomas Holcomb approved a change in the words of the first verse's fourth line from "On the land as on the sea" to "In the air, on land, and sea" to reflect the addition of aviation to the Corps' arsenal.

Western Illinois University uses the hymn prior to all football games. They are the only nonmilitary academy allowed to use the hymn. The university has had permission to use the official nickname, mascot, and hymn of the Corps since 1927.

== Lyrics ==
From the Halls of Montezuma
To the shores of Tripoli;
We fight our country's battles
In the air, on land, and sea;
First to fight for right and freedom
And to keep our honor clean;
We are proud to claim the title
Of United States Marine.

Our flag's unfurled to every breeze
From dawn to setting sun;
We have fought in ev'ry clime and place
Where we could take a gun;
In the snow of far-off Northern lands
And in sunny tropic scenes;
You will find us always on the job
The United States Marines.

Here's health to you and to our Corps
Which we are proud to serve;
In many a strife we've fought for life
And never lost our nerve;
If the Army and the Navy
Ever look on Heaven's scenes;
They will find the streets are guarded
By United States Marines.

== Extra verses ==
Various people over the years have written unofficial or semi-official extra verses to commemorate later battles and actions. For example, after U.S. military forces occupied Iceland in 1941 to guard it against possible occupation by Nazi Germany, this verse was written:

Again in nineteen forty-one, we sailed a north'ard course
And found beneath the midnight sun, the Viking and the Norse.
The Iceland girls were slim and fair, and fair the Iceland scenes,
And the Army found in landing there, the United States Marines

== See also ==
- "The Song of the Marines"
- Halls of Montezuma (film)
- To the Shores of Tripoli
- "The U.S. Air Force" (song)
- "Anchors Aweigh"
- "The Army Goes Rolling Along"
- Semper Paratus (march)
- Semper Supra (march)
- Sporting clubs that use the tune for their respective club songs:
  - Australian Football
    - Adelaide Football Club – "The Pride of South Australia"
    - Perth Football Club
    - Werribee Football Club
  - Rugby League
    - Melbourne Storm – "We Are the Mighty Melbourne Storm"
    - Canterbury Bulldogs
