= United States Coast Guard Ceremonial Honor Guard =

U.S. Coast Guard Ceremonial Honor Guard
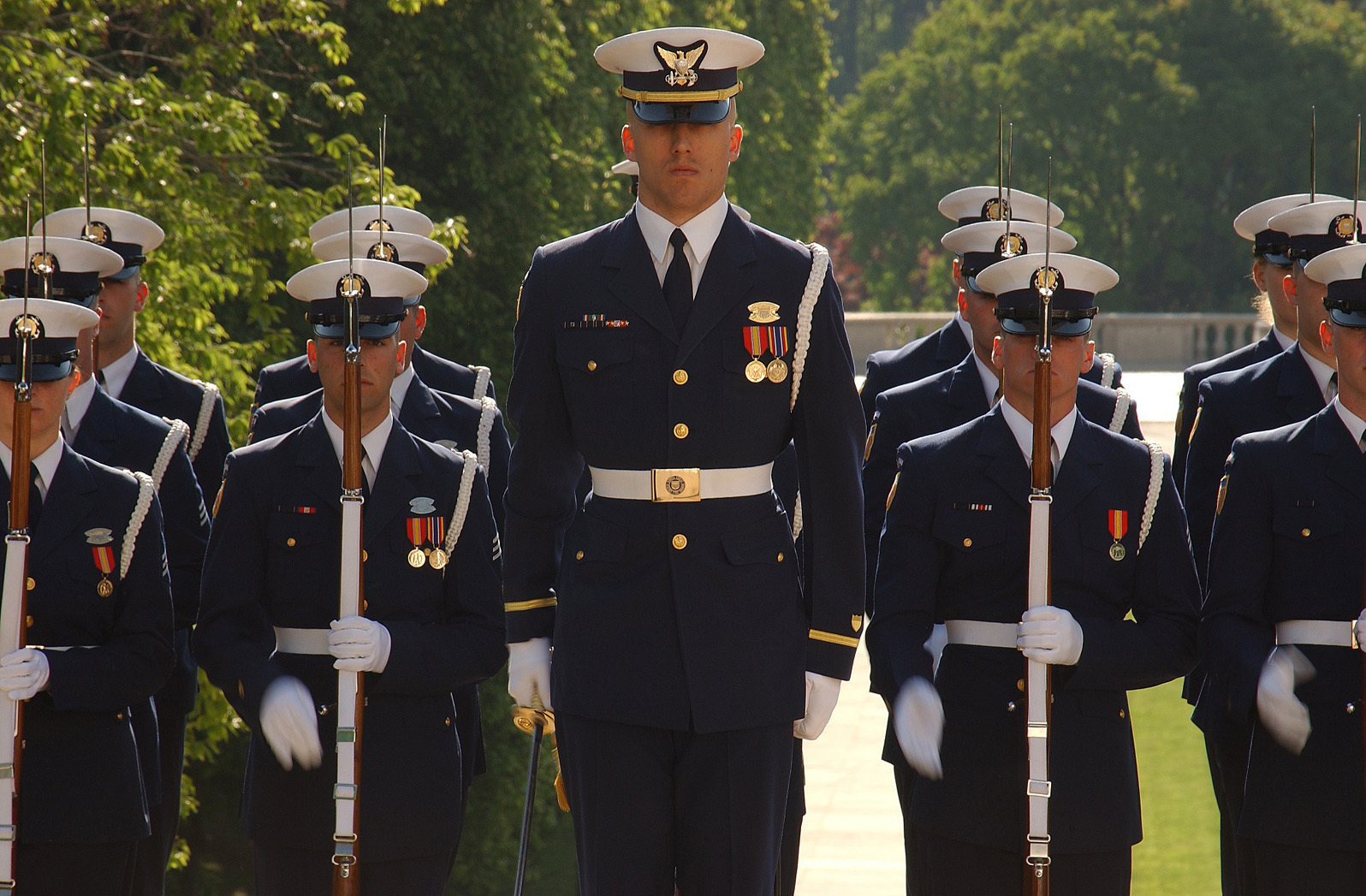
- Active: 1962 – Present
- Country: United States
- Branch: U.S. Coast Guard
- Type: honor guard
- Role: public duties
- Part of: U.S. Coast Guard Command, Control, Communication, Computer, Cyber and Intelligence Service Center (C5ISC)
- Garrison/HQ: Alexandria, Virginia, United States
- Colors: Coast Guard Blue
- Decorations: Coast Guard Unit Commendation
- Website: http://www.uscg.mil/honorguard/

Commanders
- Commanding Officer: LCDR Ryan Ball
- Master Chief: ISCM Blaine Piersol
- Executive Officer: LT Tyler Pfenninger
- Operations Officer: LT James Rimmele
- Training Officer: LTJG Patrick Wheeler

Insignia
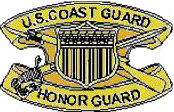
- Coast Guard Honor Guard Badge

The United States Coast Guard Ceremonial Honor Guard is a unit of the United States Coast Guard responsible for the performance of public duties. Stationed at the Command, Control, Communication, Computer, Cyber and Intelligence Service Center (C5ISC) in Alexandria, Virginia, the unit was activated in 1962.

== History ==
The U.S. Coast Guard Ceremonial Honor Guard was activated on March 5, 1962 to support Coast Guard ceremonial missions and provide a Coast Guard presence during state occasions, such as the presidential inaugural parade and state and official arrival ceremonies. Prior to this, ad hoc units raised from the Coast Guard Recruit Training Center in Cape May, New Jersey performed these functions. Initially stationed in Baltimore, Maryland, the Coast Guard Ceremonial Honor Guard was redeployed to its current station at the Command, Control, Communication, Computer, Cyber and Intelligence Service Center (C5ISC) in Alexandria, Virginia as of 1965.

== Organization ==
=== Mission ===
The U.S. Coast Guard Ceremonial Honor Guard provides – along with similar units from the U.S. Army, U.S. Navy, U.S. Marine Corps, and U.S. Air Force – marching platoons for state and official arrival ceremonies at the White House and the Pentagon, for the quadrennial presidential inaugural parade, for annual Independence Day observances in Washington, D.C., as well as for public events (recently including New Orleans Mardi Gras and the Coast Guard Festival in Grand Haven, Michigan). It also provides elements for military tattoos, change of command ceremonies, ship commissioning ceremonies, and its personnel serve as pallbearers, color guards, and firing parties at the funerals of Coast Guardsmen at Arlington National Cemetery.

According to the Coast Guard, most personnel assigned to the U.S. Coast Guard Ceremonial Honor Guard serve a two-year tour of duty with the unit and are selected directly from recruit training.

=== Uniforms ===
The unit wears the Coast Guard "full dress blue" uniform augmented with the service identification badge, white belt with embossed brass buckle, white aiguillette, and white gloves.

== Notable members ==
- Perry Ellis (fashion designer)

== See also ==
- U.S. Coast Guard Band
- U.S. Coast Guard Pipe Band
