= Coast Guard Honor Guard Badge =

Qualification badge of the US Coast Guard

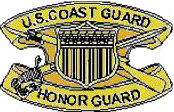
Drawing of the Coast Guard Honor Guard Badge

The Coast Guard Honor Guard Badge is a qualification badge of the United States Coast Guard which recognizes those personnel who are/have been permanently assigned to the Ceremonial Honor Guard Unit at the U.S. Coast Guard Command, Control, Communication, Computer, Cyber and Intelligence Service Center (C5ISC), Alexandria, Virginia. The badge was inspired by the Tomb of the Unknown Soldier Guard Identification Badge.

== Qualification ==
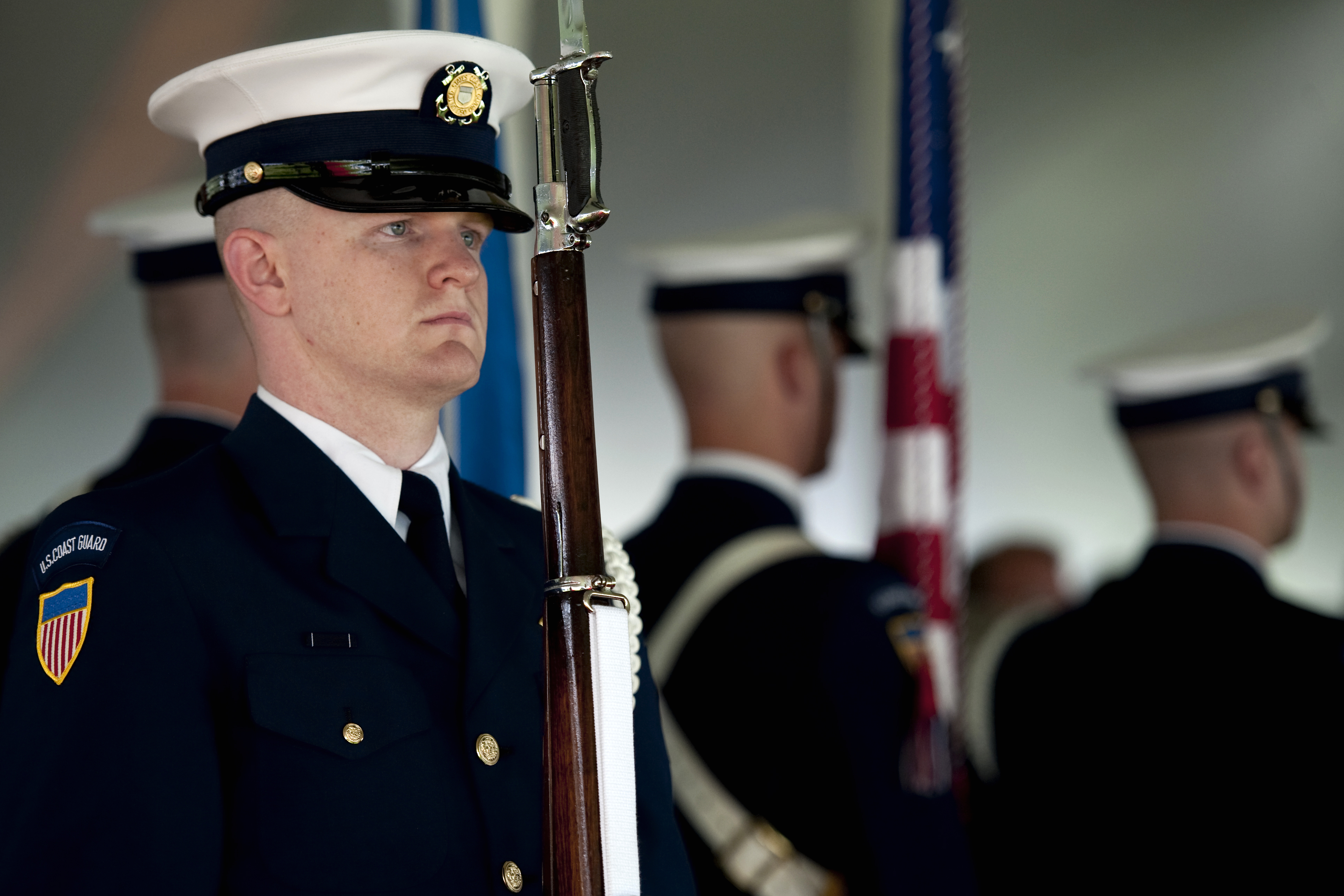
USCG Honor Guardsman

To qualify for the Honor Guard service members must be between 6 ft-6 ft 4in for men and 5 ft 10in-6 ft 4in for women. This is a regulation throughout all the five services' honor guards for uniformity on parade. All recruits must pass background clearances, health check-ups on back and legs (for long periods of standing and marching), no visible tattoos, unsightly scars and facial acne.

To be awarded the Coast Guard Honor Guard Badge, a service member must qualify in at least two fields of expertise the fields include, "Body bearing, Colors Detail, Silent Drill, and Firing Party". Once a member is qualified in two of these fields they are issued a temporary badge. The badge is authorized to wear at this point while serving out the Honor Guard commitment. At the end of the members Honor Guard term the member is evaluated and can earn the right to wear the badge permanently throughout their Coast Guard career.

Afterwards the trainee performs (keeping with the Coast Guard creed of poise, pride, perfection) ceremonies that attest and demonstrate poise before their peers, pride in their uniform, perfection in their drills and knowledge of their job sequencing. When perfected the trainee will receive their Honor Guard Badge and take their oath, becoming one of a select few. The Honor Guard performs over 1,600 ceremonies each year.

== Wear ==
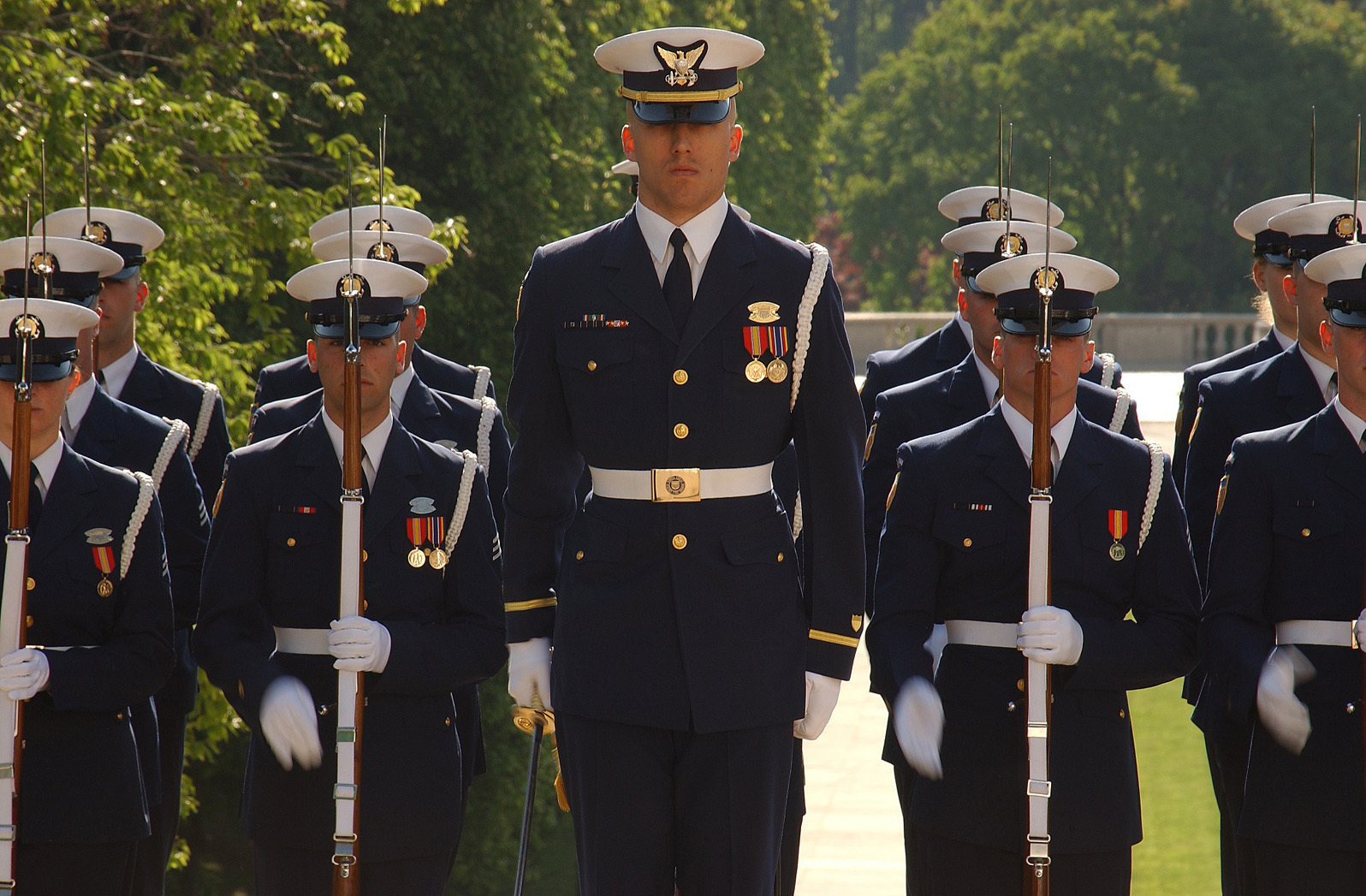
The Coast Guard Ceremonial Honor Guard, circa 2006

The badge is then worn directly above all awards and decorations on the left side of the Coast Guard uniform. Formerly, the badge was worn on the right pocket following departure from an Honor Guard assignment.

Recently, Coast Guard Honor guard badge became an identification badge, given to every honor guard member upon completion of an honor guard tour. Although it can be issued before an Honor guardsman departs, and the conditions are still the same - qualify in 2 out of 3 specialties. Wear of the badge has changed from the right pocket to directly above the ribbon rack, or directly below if a more pertinent insignia is authorized (cutterman pin, for example).

According to the Coast Guard Uniform Manual, CIM 1020.6j, the Honor Guard badge is "authorized for past and present members assigned to the Ceremonial Honor Guard."

== See also ==
- United States Coast Guard Ceremonial Honor Guard
- Military badges of the United States
