= USRC Tahoma =

Ship of the U.S. Revenue Cutter Service

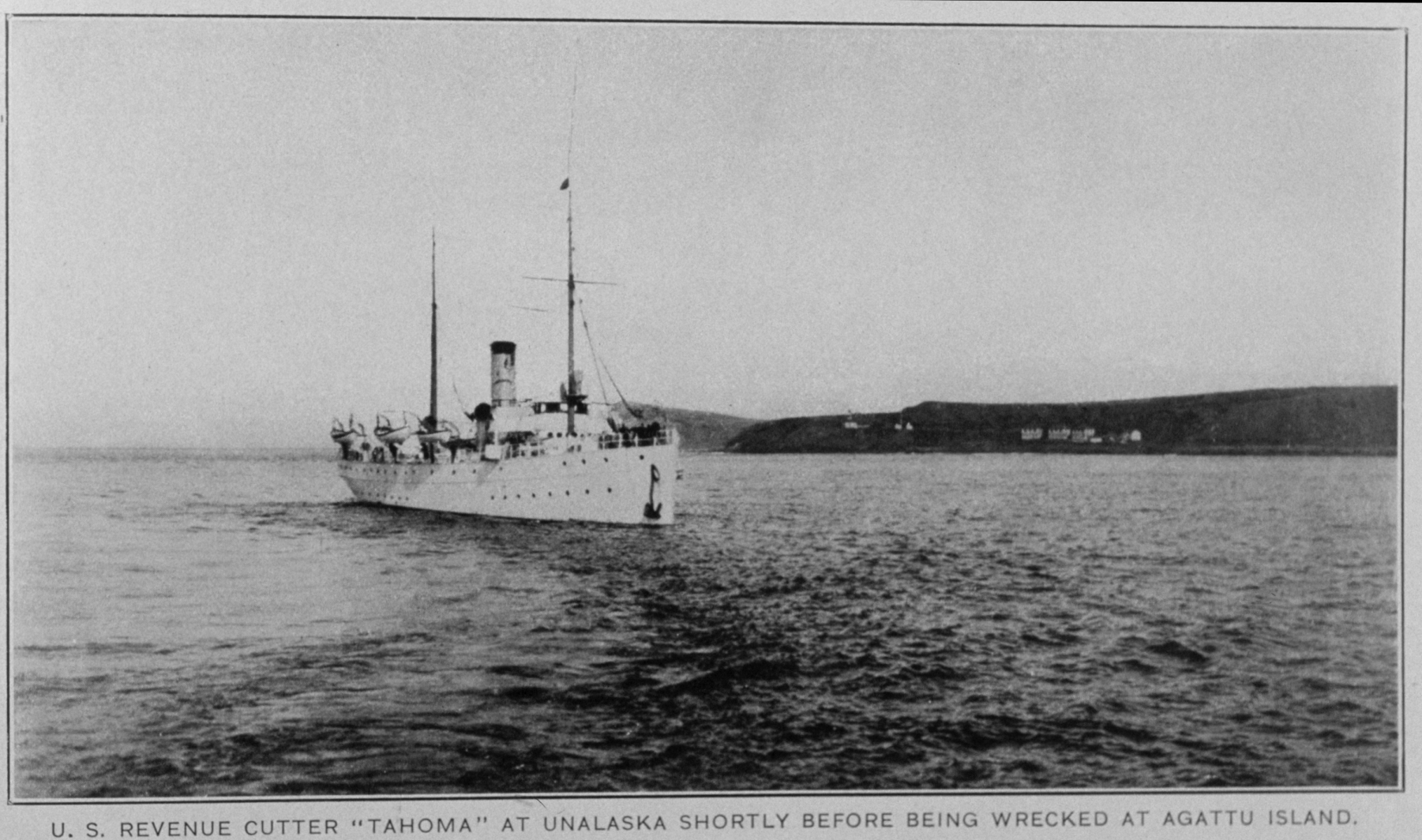

History

United States
- Name: USRC Tahoma
- Namesake: Salishan Native American word meaning "snow peak" and a principal mountain in the Cascades.
- Builder: New York Shipbuilding, Camden, New Jersey
- Cost: $225,000 (USD)
- Launched: 10 October 1908
- Commissioned: 25 March 1909
- Home port: Port Townsend, Washington
- Fate: Sank 20 September 1914

General characteristics
- Displacement: 1215 tons
- Length: 191 ft 8 in (58.42 m)
- Beam: 32 ft 6 in (9.91 m)
- Draft: 14 ft (4.3 m)
- Propulsion: Triple expansion steam engine,18",29",47" dia. x 30" stroke
- Complement: 8 officers, 61 enlisted
- Armament: 4 x 6-pound rapid fire guns

USRC Tahoma, was a steel-hull flush deck cutter that served in the United States Revenue Cutter Service from 1909 to 1914 with the Bering Sea Patrol and was the sister ship to the USRC Yamacraw.

== Commissioning and trip to homeport ==
USRC Tahoma was launched on 10 October 1908 by New York Shipbuilding at Camden, New Jersey. She was commissioned into the U.S. Revenue Cutter Service after outfitting at Arundel Cove, Maryland on 25 March 1909. Since she was to serve with the Bering Sea Patrol, she made the trip across the Atlantic Ocean and made a coaling stop at the Azores. While visiting Gibraltar she received orders from the United States Department of the Treasury to steam to Alexandrette in the Ottoman Empire to help calm American expatriate nerves during local civil unrest. Tahoma remained off the Ottoman coast for 13 days before resuming a course for the Suez Canal. After making port calls at several locations in the Pacific Ocean, she arrived at Port Townsend, Washington, on 23 August 1909.

== Bering Sea Patrol and sinking ==
The Tahoma participated in the Bering Sea Patrol along the Alaskan coast each summer enforcing fisheries regulations and assisting with search and rescue missions. She spent the winter months at her home port, Port Townsend, and underwent refits. After the steamer Yukon was wrecked on Sanak Island in the eastern Aleutian Islands on 11 June 1913, Tahoma came to her assistance and rescued the 45 people who had been aboard Yukon.

On 20 September 1914, Tahoma struck an uncharted reef in the Aleutians and sank. All hands managed to get off the sinking ship safely in boats and were picked up by the merchant steamer Cordova and the United States Coast and Geodetic Survey survey ship USC&GS Carlile P. Patterson.

== See also ==
- Mount Tahoma (Mount Rainier), the ship's namesake
