= Francis Saltus Van Boskerck =

U.S. Coast Guardsman and songwriter

Captain Francis Saltus Van Boskerck U.S.C.G.
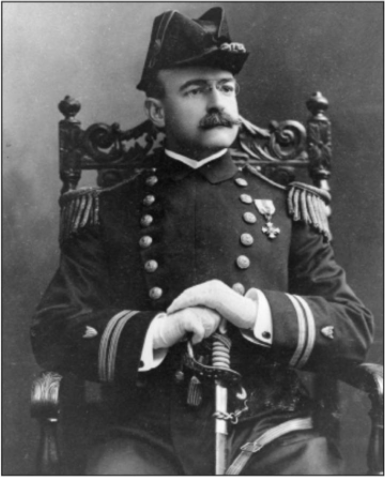
- Born: New York state
- Died: Norfolk, Virginia
- Allegiance: United States
- Branch: Revenue Cutter Service, later United States Coast Guard
- Service years: 1891–1927
- Rank: Captain
- Commands: Port of Philadelphia, 1917; USCGC Bear, 1920; USCGC Yamacraw, 1922; Great Lakes District, 1924; Bering Sea Patrol, 1925–1926; Norfolk Division, October 1926–1927
- Wars: World War I
- Education: Revenue Cutter Service School of Instruction, Naval War College
- Other work: Writer and composer of "Semper Paratus"

Francis Saltus Van Boskerck (October 1868 – November 26, 1927) was a United States Coast Guard captain known for writing and composing "Semper Paratus", the Coast Guard's official march. He held various senior positions within the Coast Guard.

Van Boskerck served in the Coast Guard as commander of the Coast Guard cutters USCGC Bear, USCGC Yamacraw and as commander of the Norfolk Division, district commander of the Great Lakes District, captain of the Port of Philadelphia, and commander of the Bering Sea Patrol. He wrote "Semper Paratus"'s words in 1922 aboard Yamacraw and its music in 1927 on a beat-up piano in the Aleutian Islands. He gave the song to Lieutenant Colonel Harvey Miller to publish the day before Van Boskerck died.

== Early life and education ==
Van Boskerck was born in October 1868 and was a native of New York state. He was appointed to join the Revenue Cutter Service School of Instruction on May 17, 1889, as a cadet. The institution would become the United States Coast Guard Academy when the modern Coast Guard was formed by the merger of the Revenue Cutter Service and Lifesaving Service in 1915. Until 1890, the School of Instruction was held on ships, when the first land-based campus for it was established in Curtis Bay, Maryland, likely making it where Van Boskerck lived. He received his commission into the Revenue Cutter Service upon graduating from the School, on May 20, 1891.

After many years in the Coast Guard, Van Boskerck attended the Naval War College in 1923 and 1924. Upon leaving, he was made district commander of the Great Lakes District.

== Career ==
Van Boskerck received a commission into the Coast Guard, then the Revenue Cutter Service on May 20, 1891. He would go on to serve twenty-three years of sea duty out of a thirty-six-year career, not leaving the Coast Guard until his death in 1927. He would rise through the ranks of the Coast Guard throughout his career, holding various senior positions.

=== Pre- and during World War I ===
Van Boskerck was first nominated for the rank of captain on May 14, 1908 by President Theodore Roosevelt. Previously, he served as a first lieutenant.

Van Boskerck's first prominent position was in 1914 and 1915, when he was tasked with overseeing the construction of the cutters Tallapoosa and Ossipee at Newport News, Virginia. In 1917, he was made captain of the Port of Philadelphia, while simultaneously being an aide for the Fourth Naval District there. He held these positions during the U.S. involvement in World War I, and was the first member of the Coast Guard to detect a German U-boat in the Atlantic.

=== Post-World War I ===
When the war ended, Van Boskerck was once again tasked with construction oversight, this time on repairs of the cutter USCGC Bear. In the summer of 1920, he commanded a cruise of Bear to the Bering Sea. In 1922, he was placed in command of USCGC Yamacraw, headquartered in Savannah, Georgia, aboard which he wrote the lyrics to "Semper Paratus". The vessel's primary mission at the time was to intercept illegal shipments of alcohol (during Prohibition) aboard boats off the coast of Florida and the Carolinas.

In 1923, Van Boskerck went to Newport, Rhode Island to attend the Naval War College, and in 1924 he was placed in command of the Great Lakes District. A year later, in 1925, he was named assistant inspector of the Northwest District. In 1925, he was put in command of the Bering Sea Patrol, headquartered in Unalaska, Alaska, and held the post into 1926. It was here he would write the music to "Semper Paratus".

In 1926, Van Boskerck returned to the East Coast and was named commander of the Norfolk Division in October in order to fill a vacancy. That fall, he took a week of leave and traveled to Washington, D.C., in order to discuss his retirement from the Coast Guard with Lieutenant Colonel Harvey Miller, also publisher and editor of Coast Guard Magazine. Miller offered him a job as national commander of the Army and Navy Union, which Van Boskerck was honored by. He would have been the first former Coast Guard member to hold the position. That day, he also persuaded Miller to publish "Semper Paratus".

== Creation of "Semper Paratus" ==
=== Writing of Lyrics ===
In 1922, Van Boskerck was in command of the cutter USCGC Yamacraw, which chased boats smuggling then-illegal alcohol in the coastal waters of Florida and the Carolinas but was headquartered in Savannah, GA. It was near the shore of this city, where, in his cabin, Van Boskerck wrote the words to "Semper Paratus". He wrote of the experience:

One day,... the inspiration came to me to write a song of the Coast Guard. It was one of those so-called "flashes" that come to people, at times, apparently from nowhere.... And so I went... and wrote the words to the song which I named "Semper Paratus"

He then presented the lyrics to the officers of Yamacraw, expecting criticism. However, despite Van Boskerck having no musical training or experience, the officers loved the song and urged him to compose music, which he would do five years later.

=== Writing of Music ===
In 1927, Van Boskerck was in command of the remote Bering Sea Patrol, a post to which he had ascended in 1925 and 1926. It was here he was able to write the music to "Semper Paratus", with the assistance of two dentists of the Public Health Service, Alf E. Nannestad and Joseph O. Fournier—the latter of whom played the violin and was nicknamed "The Singing Dentist" for singing while working. They used a piano owned by Mrs. Albert Clara Gross, the wife of a local fur trader. Gross would often open her home to Coast Guardsmen. Her piano was in poor condition but it has been speculated that it was at the time "probably the only piano in the whole long chain of the Aleutian Islands."

=== Publishing ===
Now that he had lyrics and music, Van Boskerck was ready to publish "Semper Paratus". Later in 1927, he traveled to the East Coast and was named commandant of the Norfolk Division. While attending a dance held by the League of Coast Guard Women in Norfolk, he had the nine-piece orchestra play "Semper Paratus" in public for the first time. It was met with thundering ovations and multiple calls for encores.

That fall, Van Boskerck traveled to Washington, D.C. to discuss his retirement with Lieutenant Colonel Harvey Miller, who also served as the Coast Guard Magazine's editor and publisher. After this subject had concluded, Van Boskerck produced the lyrics and sheet music to "Semper Paratus" and said to Miller "In it I have tried to pour forth all the glory, honor, and tradition of the Coast Guard. It is an anthem of Coast Guard lore and history." Less than an hour later, Miller promised to do everything in his power to get the song published.

"Semper Paratus" was published in 1928 by the Sam Fox Publishing Company.

== Death ==
After he delivered the words and music of "Semper Paratus" to Miller, Van Boskerck had intended to head to New York City for the Army–Navy football game that was to be held there. For an unknown reason, he instead decided to take a steamboat back to Norfolk. As he was leaving his room to disembark the vessel, he died abruptly of a heart attack. He had no known ailments at the time of his death. Van Boskerck died in the early hours of the morning on November 26, 1927. His death was reported by the Associated Press in The Evening Star that day.
