= The U.S. Air Force (song) =

Official song of the United States Air Force

- Organizational anthem of the U.S. Air Force
- Also known as: "Wild Blue Yonder"
- Lyrics: Robert MacArthur Crawford, 1939
- Music: Robert MacArthur Crawford, 1939
- Adopted: 1947; 79 years ago

Audio sample
- "The U.S. Air Force" (sung by a chorus): file; help

"The U.S. Air Force" is the official song of the United States Air Force, with music and lyrics by Robert MacArthur Crawford; adopted in the late 1940s, and is often referred to as "Wild Blue Yonder".

== Title changes ==
Originally, the song was titled "Army Air Corps." During World War II, the service was renamed "Army Air Forces" because of the change in the main U.S. Army's air arm naming in mid-1941, and the song title changed to agree. In 1947, when the Air Force became a separate service, the song was retitled, "The U.S. Air Force."

== Lyrics ==
=== Original lyrics ===
(Verse I)

Off we go into the wild blue yonder,
Climbing high into the sun;
Here they come, zooming to meet our thunder,
At them boys, Give 'er the gun!
Down we dive, spouting our flame from under
Off with one helluva roar!
We live in fame or go down in flame. Hey!
Nothing'll stop the Army Air Corps!

(Verse II)

Minds of men fashioned a crate of thunder,
Sent it high into the blue;
Hands of men blasted the world asunder;
How they lived God only knew! (God only knew, then!)
Souls of men dreaming of skies to conquer
Gave us wings, ever to soar!
With scouts before and bombers galore. Hey!
Nothing'll stop the Army Air Corps!

(Verse III)

Here's a toast to the host
Of those who love the vastness of the sky,
To a friend we send a message of his brother men who fly.
We drink to those who gave their all of old
Then down we roar to score the rainbow's pot of gold.
A toast to the host of men we boast, the Army Air Corps!

(Verse IV)

Off we go into the wild sky yonder,
Keep the wings level and true.
If you'd live to be a grey-haired wonder
Keep the nose out of the blue. (Out of the blue, boy!)
Flying men, guarding the nation's border,
We'll be there, followed by more!
In echelon we carry on. Hey!
Nothing'll stop the Army Air Corps!

=== Current version, as of 2020 ===
(Verse I)

Off we go into the wild blue yonder,
Climbing high into the sun;
Here they come zooming to meet our thunder,
At ‘em now, Give 'em the gun!
Down we dive, spouting our flame from under,
Off with one helluva roar!
We live in fame or go down in flame. Hey!
Nothing'll stop the U.S. Air Force!

(Verse II)

Brilliant minds fashioned a crate of thunder,
Sent it high into the blue;
Valiant hands blasted the world asunder;
How they lived God only knew!
Boundless souls dreaming of skies to conquer
Gave us wings, ever to soar!
With scouts before and bombers galore. Hey!
Nothing'll stop the U.S. Air Force!

(Verse III)

Here's a toast to the host
Of those who love the vastness of the sky,
To a friend we send a message of the brave who serve on high.
We drink to those who gave their all of old
Then down we roar to score the rainbow's pot of gold.
A toast to the host of those we boast, the U.S. Air Force!

(Verse IV)

Off we go into the wild sky yonder,
Keep the wings level and true;
If you'd live to be a grey-haired wonder
Keep the nose out of the blue!
Fly to fight, guarding the nation's border,
We'll be there, followed by more!
In echelon we carry on.
Oh, nothing'll stop the U.S. Air Force!

== History ==
"The Army Air Force" being performed by the Boston Pops in 1944

As Apollo 15 Lunar Module Falcon lifts off from the Moon on August 2, 1971, astronauts and Air Force pilots David Scott and James Irwin play a prerecorded instrumental version of the song.

In 1937, Assistant Chief of the Air Corps Brig. Gen. Henry H. Arnold persuaded the Chief of the Air Corps, Maj. Gen. Oscar Westover, that the Air Corps needed an official song reflecting their unique identity in the same manner as the other military services, and proposed a song competition with a prize to the winner. However, the Air Corps did not control its budget, and could not give a prize. In April 1938, Bernarr A. Macfadden, publisher of Liberty magazine stepped in, offering a prize of $1,000 to the winning composer, stipulating that the song must be of simple "harmonic structure", "within the limits of [an] untrained voice", and its beat in "march tempo of military pattern".

Over 700 compositions were received and evaluated by a volunteer committee of senior Air Corps wives with musical backgrounds chaired by Mildred Yount, the wife of Brig. Gen. Barton K. Yount. The committee had until July 1939 to make a final choice. However, word eventually spread that the committee did not find any songs that satisfied them, despite the great number of entries. Arnold, who became Chief of the Air Corps in 1938 after Westover was killed in a plane crash, solicited direct inquiries from professional composers and commercial publishers, including Meredith Willson and Irving Berlin, but not even Berlin's creation proved satisfactory, although it was used as the title music to the 1943 play Winged Victory by Moss Hart.

Two days before the deadline, music instructor Robert Crawford, a rejected World War One Air Service pilot and professional musician billed as "the Flying Baritone," personally delivered a sound recording of his entry, which proved to be a unanimous winner.

=== Reception ===
Mrs. Yount recalled that Rudolph Ganz, guest conductor of the National Symphony Orchestra and a consultant to the committee, was immediately and enthusiastically in favor of the winner.

The contest rules required the winner to submit his entry in written form, and Crawford immediately complied. However his original title, What Do You think of the Air Corps Now?, was soon officially changed to The Army Air Corps. Crawford himself publicly sang the song for the first time over national radio from the 1939 National Air Races.

Not everyone was fond of the song. During a dinner of September 1939, Mrs. Yount played a recording of the song for Charles Lindbergh and asked his opinion. He responded politely to Yount, but years later remarked in a diary, "I think it is mediocre at best. Neither the music nor the words appealed to me." Arnold did not share Lindbergh's opinion: he sought to fund publication of band and ensemble arrangements of the song for nationwide distribution. However, the Air Corps did not have enough money to publicize the song, so Crawford arranged a transfer of the song's copyright to New York music publisher Carl Fischer Inc., including a perpetual performance release in favor of the U.S. Air Force.

== Additional songs ==
In addition to the U.S. Air Force song, there have been several other songs that have been at times used by the Air Force regionally and nationally during public events. However, none of them was ever identified as "the Air Force song". One song in particular, "Men in the Air Force Blue", written and copyrighted in 1966, was for a time in the mid 1960s and early 1970s a favorite among Air Force personnel both in country and abroad. The song was written by Eve Lawson, the wife of Technical Sergeant Lawrence E. Lawson, while they were stationed at Niagara Falls. She initially performed the song locally but soon went on to perform at several public events for the Air Force in Washington D.C. It was during one of these performances that the song caught the attention of President Lyndon B. Johnson who had one of his senior military aides write a letter to her thanking her for the contribution of the song and of her performance. The song began to catch a more broad following with performances by Eve Lawson on local and nationwide radio and even an appearance on Liz Dribben's Dialing for Dollars television program.

== Performance of the song ==
Most commonly, only the first verse is performed, though in professional performances all four verses may be presented. The song is often sung at Air Force-related functions, and is sung before Physical Training (PT) exercise by basic trainees at Lackland Air Force Base. Although not the Academy's official fight song, the first verse of the song is also frequently played at United States Air Force Academy sporting events and at other Academy functions, such as parades.

=== Third verse ===
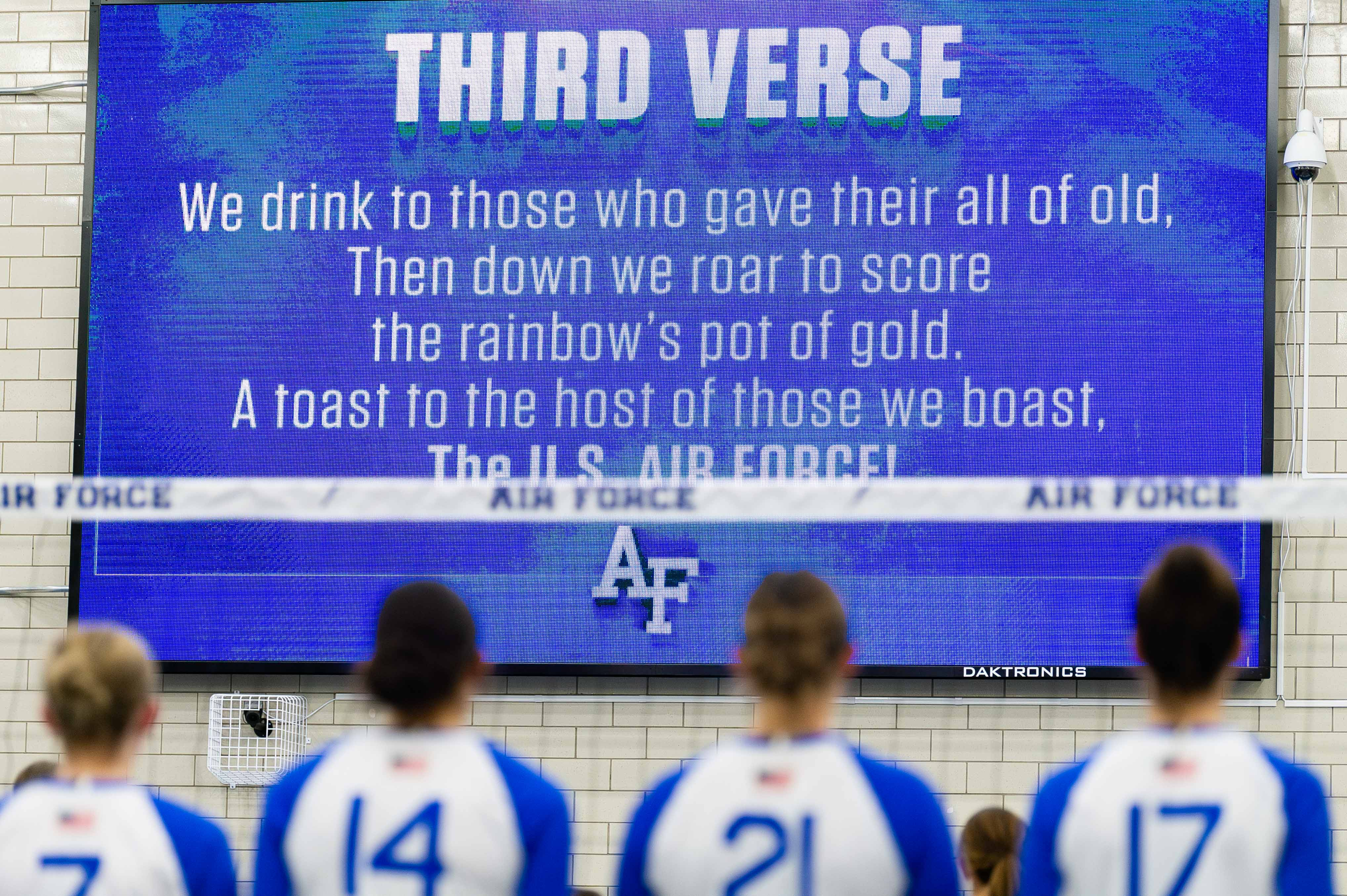
The third verse displayed during a performance at an Air Force Falcons volleyball game in 2024

The third verse ("Here's a toast...") has a different melody, and a more reverent mood than the rest of the song to commemorate those who have fallen in the service of the Air Force and the United States. This verse is sometimes performed independently of the other verses. The third verse is sung by itself after most Academy sporting events, with the entire Cadet Wing participating after a football game. It is sung in conjunction with Army's Alma Mater and Navy's Blue and Gold, when the teams combine to participate in the singing of both Academies' songs. The third verse is also traditionally sung by Academy cadets and graduates as an alma mater to honor the passing of a fellow cadet or graduate.

==== Lyrical updates ====
On 27 February 2020, the third verse was updated to celebrate all men and women who serve in the USAF. In the words of USAF General David L. Goldfein (Chief of Staff, United States Air Force; USAF Academy Class of 1983) this "new version of the third verse...better reflects the reality of today's force by celebrating all who have—and will—step up to serve." The verse's third and sixth lines were changed as follows:

Third line: from "To a friend we send a message of his brother men who fly" to "To a friend we send a message of the brave who serve on high."

Sixth line: from "A toast to the host of men we boast, the U.S. Air Force!" to "A toast to the host of those we boast, the U.S. Air Force!"

Goldfein alluded to future changes in this announcement with the statement "we’ll also take a hard look at whether further updates may be warranted for the other verses of the song."

=== Final changes on first, second, and fourth verse ===
On 29 May 2020, all stanzas of the Air Force song were updated. The official announcement stated that these changes "completes a two-step process in which male-only references were revised to capture the distinguished service, the high standards, and central role that women play in every facet of the modern United States Air Force." The lyrics have been changed from male-only to gender-neutral as it follows:

First verse on fourth line: "At 'em boys, Give 'er the gun!" to "At ‘em now, Give 'em the gun!"

Second verse on first line: "Minds of men fashioned a crate of thunder," to "Brilliant minds fashioned a crate of thunder,"

Second verse on third line: "Hands of men blasted the world asunder;" to "Valiant hands blasted the world asunder;"

Second verse on fifth line: "Souls of men dreaming of skies to conquer" to "Boundless souls dreaming of skies to conquer"

Fourth verse on fifth line: "Flying men, guarding the nation's border," to "Fly to fight, guarding the nation's border,"

=== Changes in the lyrics to rhyme with "Force" ===
Following the initial change on June 20, 1941 of the American air force's name from "Army Air Corps" to "Army Air Force(s)", to the post-World War II 1947 establishment of the separate "U.S. Air Force", an attempt was made to change the sixth line of each verse so that the last word rhymed with "force" instead of "corps". Thus, "Off with one helluva roar!" became "Off on one helluva course!"; "Gave us wings, ever to soar!" became "Gave our wings every resource!"; and "We'll be there, followed by more!" became "We'll be there, ever on course!"

These changes appeared in the 1972 edition of the USAF publication Air Force Customs and Courtesies but were never popular, and the lyrics were reverted in later editions.

== Alternate song: U.S. Air Force Blue ==
"Air Force Blue" played on TV in 1957

An unofficial Air Force song, "The U.S. Air Force Blue," was composed during 1956 by Marilyn Scott and Keith Textor, who specialized in providing music for radio and television commercials. It was sung by the Basic Airmens Choir of Parks Air Force Base, California, at SAC's 25th anniversary on the Dave Garroway Show in 1956, and released as a feature in the Air Force News newsreel as sung by Mitch Miller's chorus and orchestra.

They took the blue from the skies and a pretty girl's eyes
and a touch of Old Glory's hue,
And gave it to the men who proudly wear the U.S. Air Force blue.

The U.S. Air Force Blue

Oh, they are men with a dream on America's team,
They're a rugged and ready crew.
And you can bet your boots the world looks up to U.S. Air Force Blue.

To U.S. Air Force Blue!

They know where they're goin', they've set their course,
the sky's no limit in the Air Force.

They took the blue from the skies and a pretty girl's eyes
and a touch of Old Glory's hue,
And gave it to the men who proudly wear the U.S. Air Force Blue.

And you can wear it too!

The U.S... Air Force... Blue!

The Air Force bought the rights to the song and released it into the public domain.

The current arrangement, by MSgt Tom Dosett, has the following lyrics:

We take the blue from the skies and some pretty blue eyes
And a touch of Old Glory's hue,
And fervently declare we're proud to wear
The U.S. Air Force Blue.

We have the drive and the dream in America's team
We're a rugged and ready crew
And you can bet your boots the world looks up
To U.S. Air Force Blue.

We know where we're going, we've set our course
The sky's no limit in the Air Force!

And when the blue from the skies meets the gleam in our eyes
And a touch of Old Glory's hue,
We fervently declare we're proud to wear
The U.S. Air Force Blue.

== See also ==
- Anchors Aweigh
- The Army Goes Rolling Along
- Marines' Hymn
- Semper Paratus (march)
- Semper Supra (march)
