= Robert MacArthur Crawford =

American songwriter (1899–1961)

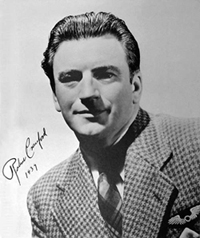
- Robert MacArthur Crawford
- Born: Robert MacArthur Crawford; July 27, 1899; Dawson City, Yukon, Canada
- Died: March 12, 1961 (aged 61); New York City, New York, U.S.
- Occupation: Composer

Robert MacArthur Crawford (July 27, 1899 – March 12, 1961) is known for writing The U.S. Air Force song. He was born in Dawson City, Yukon, Canada and spent his childhood in Fairbanks, Alaska. He graduated high school in 1915 at Chehalis High School in Chehalis, Washington. During World War I, he attempted to become a pilot in the United States Army Air Service but was dismissed when he was discovered to be underage. He attended the Case Scientific Institute in Cleveland, known today as Case Western Reserve University, where he was a member of the Phi Kappa Psi fraternity. Crawford then enrolled in Princeton University, and graduated in 1925. He later studied and taught at the Juilliard School of Music. Crawford learned how to fly an airplane in 1923. He flew himself around the United States in a small plane to concerts, where he was introduced as "The Flying Baritone." Liberty magazine sponsored a contest in 1938 for a musical composition that would become the official song of the U.S. Army Air Corps. Out of 757 submissions, Crawford's was chosen as the winner. The song was officially introduced at the Cleveland Air Races on Sept. 2, 1939, where Crawford sang its first public rendition.

During World War II, Crawford flew for the Air Transport Command of the U.S. Army Air Forces. In 1947, Crawford joined the University of Miami's music faculty. He remained there for ten years, until he left to focus on composing.
