= Anchors Aweigh =

United States Naval Academy fight song

Anchors Aweigh!
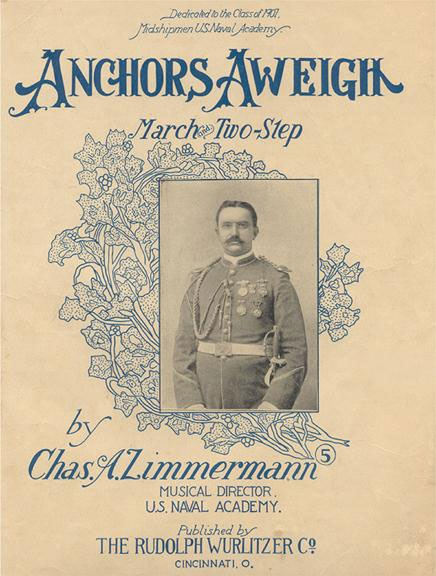
- Organizational anthem of the U.S. Navy
- Lyrics: John Hagan, 1997
- Music: Charles A. Zimmermann, 1906
- Adopted: 1907; 119 years ago

Audio sample
- 1993 recording of "Anchors Aweigh" in Zimmermann's original 1906 arrangement, as performed by the United States Navy Band: file; help

Anchors Aweigh is the fight song of the United States Naval Academy and unofficial march song of the United States Navy. It was composed in 1906 by Charles A. Zimmermann with lyrics by Alfred Hart Miles. When he composed Anchors Aweigh, Zimmermann was a lieutenant and had been bandmaster of the United States Naval Academy Band since 1887. Miles was midshipman first class at the academy, in the class of 1907, and had asked Zimmermann to assist him in composing a song for that class, to be used as a football march. Another academy midshipman, Royal Lovell (class of 1926), later wrote what would be adopted into the song as its third verse. Another member of the Naval Academy Band, Willy Perlitz Jr., assisted in writing the music for the different instruments used in Anchors Aweigh.

== Etymology ==
"Weigh anchor" is an old English sailors' expression first referenced in literature in John Dryden's The Tempest, in 1670. It is an order that a ship's anchors be raised. To "weigh anchor" is to bring all anchor(s) aboard the vessel in preparation for departure. In response to the order, the phrase "anchors aweigh" reports back that all anchors are clear of the sea bottom; therefore the ship is officially under way.

"Anchors aweigh" is often misspelled as "Anchor's away", leading to confusing the terms, and sometimes misunderstanding the order as meaning "to drop anchor". Confusion may also occur over two correct spellings typically encountered: that is, "anchor's" with an apostrophe, and without ("anchors"). Here the phrase "anchor's aweigh", (denoting a single anchor plus the contraction of the verb "is") means: this anchor is raised. The single phrase must be distinguished from the plural "anchors aweigh", which reports that all anchors of the ship are raised.

Although the original (now archaic) "aweigh" is verbal and transitive, the "aweigh" used now is adjectival/adverbial in nature and meaning. "Weigh" as a verb means to "bear" or "move", thus giving it several shades of meaning and derivation, including "weight" or "heaviness".

== Composition ==
Chorus to "Anchors Aweigh"

Many arrangements of the song exist, but the original composition by Zimmermann from 1906, is labelled as a "March and Two-Step" and consists of a lengthy instrumental march introductory section, which then becomes a two-step with lyrical accompaniment approximately halfway into the piece.

Many arrangements of "Anchors Aweigh" exist today, one arrangement by Paul V. Yoder often sees use by military bands, such as those of the Japan Self-Defense Forces, the Bundeswehr, and other nations' militaries.

== History ==
U.S. Navy recruits singing the post-1997 lyrics of "Anchors Aweigh" as they walk through a tunnel at Recruit Training Command Great Lakes in Illinois.

The song was first played during the Army–Navy football game on December 1, 1906, at Franklin Field in Philadelphia, Pennsylvania. Navy won the game 10–0 before a crowd in excess of 30,000, their first win in the matchup since 1900.

The song was gradually adopted as the song of the U.S. Navy; although there is a pending proposal to make it the official song, and to incorporate protocol into Navy regulations for its performance, its status remains unofficial. Its lyrics were considered too specific to the Academy and not representative of the Navy at large, and so were rewritten by George D. Lottman (note the reference to "farewell to college joys"). Its melody was also slightly rewritten by Domenico Savino.

The song has a joyful, brisk melody, and it has been adopted by several other navies around the world, such as the Finnish Navy. In addition to being bandmaster at the Naval Academy, Zimmerman was also the organist at St. Mary's Catholic Church in Annapolis, and the opening notes of the melody to "Anchors Aweigh" bear a marked similarity (although in a different tempo) to the opening of the ancient Marian hymn Salve Regina, with which Zimmerman would have been thoroughly familiar.

During World War II, members of the Navy Women's Reserve, known more popularly as the WAVES, wrote "WAVES of the Navy" to harmonize with "Anchors Aweigh".

Bing Crosby included the song in a medley on his 1961 album 101 Gang Songs.

It was also sung by a group of soldiers in the 1958 film version of the Rogers and Hammerstein musical South Pacific, during the Thanksgiving show.

== Lyrics ==
1943 sheet music

Performed in 1930 by Phil Spitalny

Performed by the Boston Pops in 1944

Abridged version performed by the U.S. Navy Band in the 1990s

"Anchors Aweigh" (1906 version), which is still used today at the Naval Academy.

Stand Navy down the field, sails set to the sky;
We'll never change our course, So Army you steer shy-y-y-y.
Roll up the score, Navy, anchors aweigh!
Sail Navy down the field and sink the Army, sink the Army grey!

Get under way Navy, decks cleared for the fray;
We'll hoist true Navy Blue, So Army down your grey-y-y-y;
Full speed ahead, Navy; Army heave to;
Furl Black and Grey and Gold, and hoist the Navy, hoist the Navy Blue!

Blue of the Seven Seas; Gold of God's Great Sun
Let these our colors be till all of time be done, done, done,
By Severn's shore we learn Navy's stern call:
Faith, Courage, Service true, with Honor, Over Honor, Over All.

Revised Lyrics of 1926 by George D. Lottman:

Stand, Navy, out to sea, Fight our battle cry;
We'll never change our course, So vicious foe steer shy-y-y-y.
Roll out the TNT, Anchors Aweigh. Sail on to victory
And sink their bones to Davy Jones, hooray!

Anchors Aweigh, my boys, Anchors Aweigh.
Farewell to college joys, we sail at break of day-ay-ay-ay.
Through our last night on shore, drink to the foam,
Until we meet once more. Here's wishing you a happy voyage home.

Revised Lyrics of 1997 by then-MCPON John Hagan which is used today by the Navy:

Stand Navy out to sea, fight our battle cry!
We'll never change our course so vicious foes steer shy-y-y-y!
Roll out the TNT, anchors aweigh!
Sail on to victory, and sink their bones to Davy Jones, hooray!

Anchors Aweigh, my boys, Anchors Aweigh!
Farewell to foreign Shores, we sail at break of day-ay-ay-ay;
Through our last night ashore, drink to the foam,
Until we meet once more, here's wishing you a happy voyage home!

Blue of the mighty deep, Gold of God's great sun;
Let these our colors be, Till All of time be done, done, done, done;
On seven seas we learn, Navy's stern call:
Faith, courage, service true, With honor over, honor over all.

== See also ==
- Marines' Hymn, the song of the United States Marine Corps (USMC)
- Semper Paratus (march), the song of the United States Coast Guard (USCG)
- The Army Goes Rolling Along, the song of the United States Army (USA)
- The U.S. Air Force (song), the song of the United States Air Force (USAF)
- Semper Supra (march), the song of the United States Space Force
