= United States Coast Guard Pipe Band =

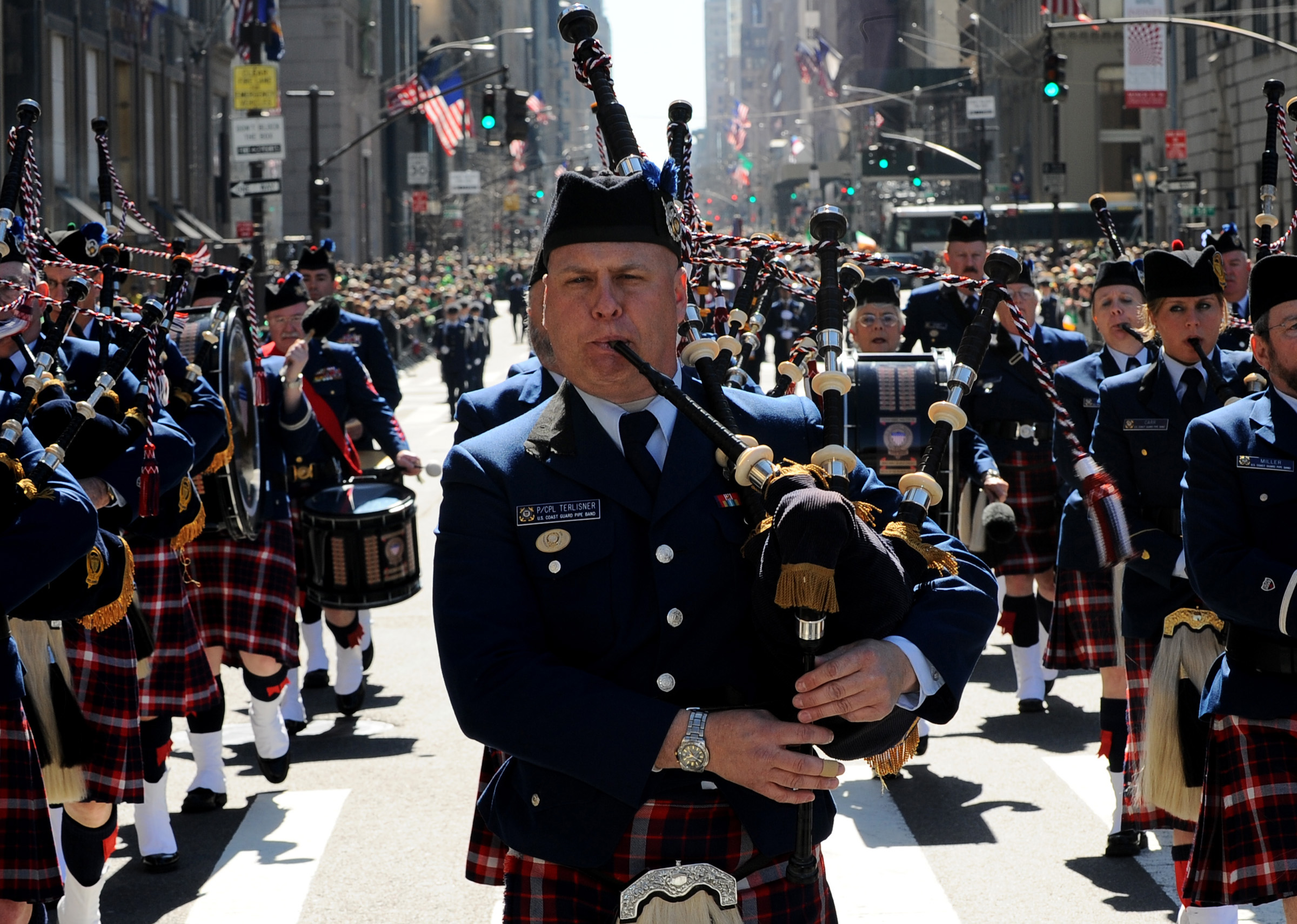
- The U.S. Coast Guard Pipe Band pictured in 2010.
- Active: 2002 to Present
- Allegiance: United States
- Branch: U.S. Coast Guard
- Type: Military Band/Pipe Band
- Role: Public Duties
- Size: 55
- Principal Address: Miami, Florida
- Nickname: "The Commandant's Own"
- Colors: Coast Guard Blue; Red
- Decorations: Meritorious Team Commendation
- Website: http://www.uscgpipeband.org/

Commanders
- Pipe Major: ML Loudermik
- Drum Major: Kevin Conquest

The United States Coast Guard Pipe Band is a pipe band and private military unit composed of current and former United States Coast Guard personnel. Though a privately maintained entity, it is formally recognized by the U.S. Coast Guard and provides support to official Coast Guard ceremonies including changes-of-command, funerals, and ship commissioning. The unit was established in 2001 and formally recognized by the U.S. Coast Guard as a Coast Guard-affiliated organization the following year.

== History and operations ==
The idea for a Coast Guard pipe band originated with U.S. Coast Guard Chief Warrant Officer Kevin Gilheany who organized the group in 2001. The following year it received special authorization from the Commandant of the Coast Guard recognizing it as an affiliate organization and permitting it to incorporate "United States Coast Guard" into its name.

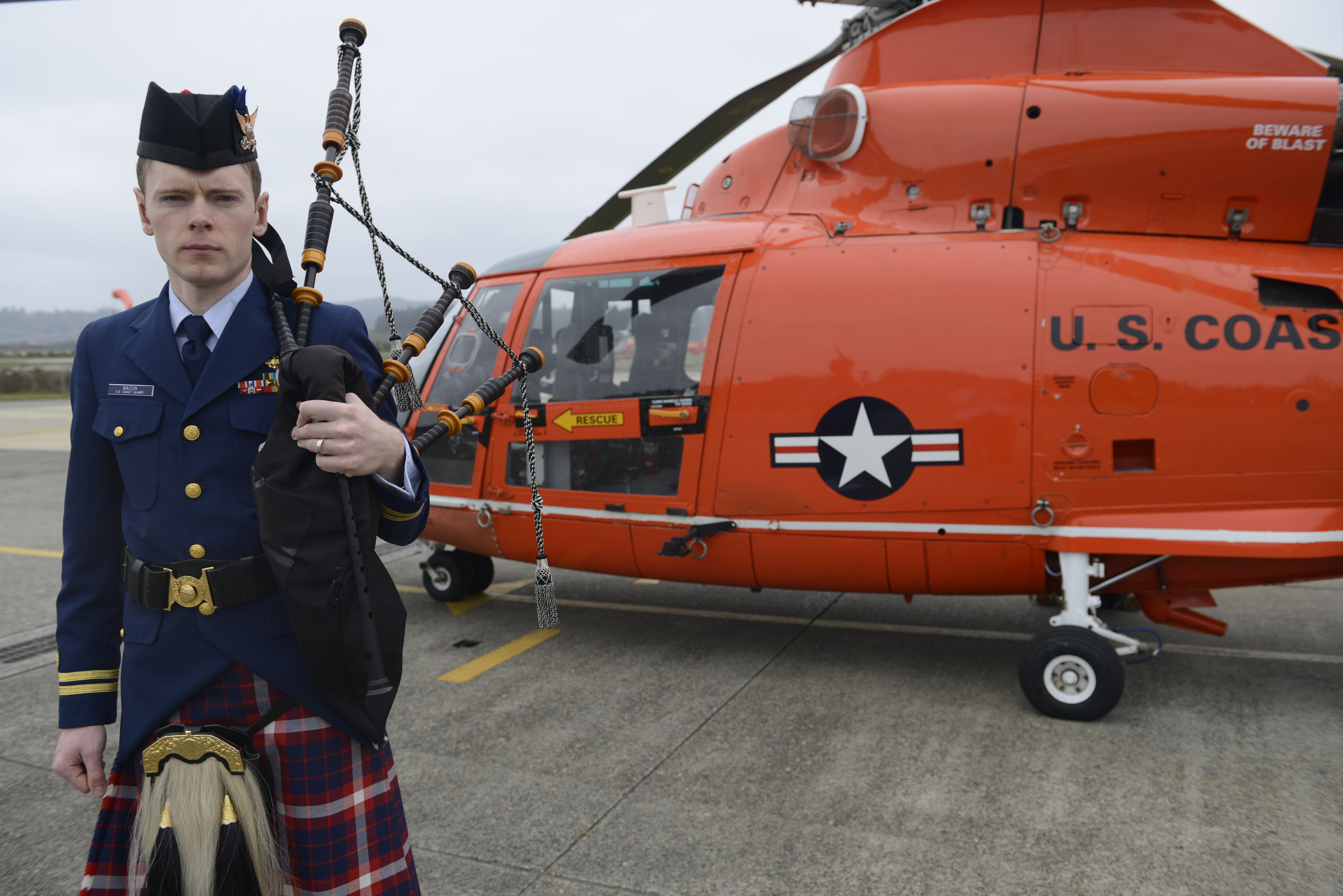
A Coast Guard Pipe Band member pictured in 2015 at Air Station North Bend.

The U.S. Coast Guard Pipe Band is organized into local detachments and its performances typically consist of a single piper and drummer performing for U.S. Coast Guard change-of-command ceremonies, military funerals, and Coast Guard ship commissioning events, however, large ensembles have occasionally been raised for parades and other major occasions including the Grand Haven, Michigan Coast Guard Festival and the New York St. Patrick's Day parade. Membership is restricted to personnel of the U.S. Coast Guard, U.S. Coast Guard Reserve, and U.S. Coast Guard Auxiliary, as well as honorably discharged "wartime veterans" of the U.S. Coast Guard and U.S. Coast Guard Reserve. According to the organization, the restriction to "wartime veterans" is due to Coast Guard uniform regulations which only permit non-serving persons to wear the Coast Guard uniform if they previously served during a declared war or national emergency.

As of 2016, the U.S. Coast Guard Pipe Band was a 501(c)(3) organization incorporated in Florida.

== Uniforms and equipment ==
U.S. Coast Guard Pipe Band personnel wear modified highland dress consisting of standard Coast Guard and Coast Guard Auxiliary Service Dress Blue "Bravo" uniforms, Tropical Blue Long, and Dinner Dress Blue uniforms augmented with a kilt patterned in the Coast Guard tartan in lieu of trousers.

The Coast Guard tartan was designed by Joanne Pendleton in 2002 and was subsequently listed in the Scottish Register of Tartans. It is patterned in red and blue with a white ten-thread count supposed to represent the first ten cutters of the Revenue-Marine. The tartan's full thread count is W10 R10 CGB12 R2 CGB12 ("CGB" meaning "Coast Guard Blue").

== See also ==
- U.S. Coast Guard Band
- U.S. Coast Guard Ceremonial Honor Guard
