= Halls of Montezuma (film) =

1951 film by Lewis Milestone

- Theatrical release poster
- Directed by: Lewis Milestone
- Written by: Michael Blankfort
- Produced by: Robert Bassler
- Starring: Richard Widmark
- Cinematography: Winton C. Hoch; Harry Jackson
- Edited by: William H. Reynolds
- Music by: Sol Kaplan
- Color process: Technicolor
- Production company: Twentieth Century-Fox
- Distributed by: Twentieth Century-Fox
- Release dates: January 4, 1951 (Los Angeles); January 5, 1951 (New York)
- Running time: 113 minutes
- Country: United States
- Language: English
- Box office: $2.65 million (U.S. rentals)

Halls of Montezuma is a 1951 American World War II war film directed by Lewis Milestone and starring Richard Widmark, Jack Palance, Reginald Gardiner and Robert Wagner in his first credited screen role. The plot concerns U.S. Marines fighting on a Japanese-held island, and the title is a reference to the opening line from the Marines' Hymn.

Real color combat footage from the war in the Pacific was incorporated into the film's cinematography, and scenes at Camp Pendleton, California were filmed on location with the full cooperation of the Marines.

== Plot ==
During World War II, a Marine battalion prepares to land on a Japanese-held island in the Pacific. Lieutenant Colonel Gilfillan orders the men to take prisoners in order to gain information about Japanese fortifications. Below deck, veteran Lieutenant Carl A. Anderson reassures frightened Corporal Stuart Conroy that he has shown courage before and can do so again, Anderson having been a science teacher before the war, and Conroy had been one of his students. In the landing boat heading to shore, Navy corpsman C. E. "Doc" Jones is worried because Anderson has been suffering from migraine for months, receiving painkillers from Doc. Anderson leads the men as they hit the beach. They try to take a ridge of hills but are deterred by a sudden Japanese rocket attack, during which his radio operator Private First Class Coffman, whom Anderson pulled out of the drink at Tawara is killed. Anderson meets with other officers at battalion headquarters, where Gilfillan informs them that he has received orders to stop the rockets within nine hours, before the next assault on the hills. He assigns Anderson's platoon the task of capturing Japanese prisoners to interrogate in an effort to learn the exact origin of the rocket fire. The colonel assigns Sergeant Johnson, an expert in Oriental languages and culture, to assist Anderson.

Among those whom Carl selects for his task, he includes his six of his most battle-hardened veterans, the last of his original men from 42 on Guadalcanal, Pigeon Lane, Slattery, Doc, Conroy, Sergeant Zelenko, Riley 'Pretty Boy' Duncanon and a replacement named Whitney, bringing along war correspondent Sergeant Dickerman as well, under Gilfillan's orders. Guided by Johnson, he leads them on patrol to a Japanese-held cave, where they are ambushed, resulting in Zelenko being blinded. Anderson's men capture five Japanese soldiers, including a shell-shocked old man, and kill the others. However, during their return to battalion headquarters, their number is reduced. Doc, the corpsman, dies of wounds, and Lane accidentally kills Pretty Boy when tries to stop him killing the prisoners, only for Pretty Boy to pull his rifle, making it misfire and kill him. Anderson, Johnson, Conroy, Slattery, Lane, Whitney and Dickerman are the only fully able-bodied survivors of the patrol. Anderson takes his prisoners to headquarters, but one Japanese officer commits seppuku. Later, Anderson and Johnson learn that one of the prisoners is a highly educated Major disguised as a private. After questioning him, they determine the location of the rockets.

A map expert at headquarters matches the location. Anderson's mission is thus accomplished, and Colonel Gilfillan offers his grateful thanks. But as Anderson returns to the platoon, he learns that Conroy has been killed from Slattery. Anderson is shocked the most by this death, and is disturbed by the news and questions the meaning of his sacrifice. In response, Dickerman reads aloud a note that Doc had given to him. Anderson, inspired by Doc's appeal that he remain strong for the other men, destroys his painkillers with the butt of his weapon. He leads his men in another assault on the Japanese, and Navy F4U Corsairs smash the Japanese rocket positions.

== Cast ==
- Richard Widmark as Lt. Carl A. Anderson
- Jack Palance as Pigeon Lane
- Reginald Gardiner as Sgt. Randolph Johnson
- Robert Wagner as Private Coffman
- Karl Malden as Doc
- Richard Hylton as Conroy
- Richard Boone as Lt. Col. Gilfillan
- Skip Homeier as Pretty Boy
- Don Hicks as Lt. Butterfield
- Jack Webb as Correspondent Sgt. Dickerman
- Bert Freed as Slattery
- Neville Brand as Sgt. Zelenko
- Martin Milner as Whitney
- Philip Ahn as Nomura

== Production ==
Dana Andrews, Anne Baxter and Paul Douglas were originally set to star in the film but did not become members of the cast.

The film used various locations around Camp Pendleton and the adjacent Pacific coast for the landing scenes. The Marines also provided accurate military equipment, such as weapons, tanks and uniforms, and provided the manpower to create the logistics of a wartime Marines battalion. The Marines assigned Major George A. Gilliland, the recipient of two Bronze Stars and a Purple Heart, as a technical advisor for the film.

Halls of Montezuma is the final American World War II film directed by Lewis Milestone, who next directed films in Europe and in other genres.

== Release ==
The film's invitational world premiere was held at Grauman's Chinese Theatre in Hollywood on January 4, 1951. Marines marched up Hollywood Boulevard and the 60-piece 1st Marine Division Band from Camp Pendleton played music, including an updated version of the "Marines' Hymn" that included lyrics mentioning victories won since those mentioned in the original song. Many of Hollywood's top famous film stars attended, and the festivities were hosted by George Jessel.

Proceeds from the Hollywood and New York premieres were donated to charities associated with the United States Marine Corps. The studio also allowed the USMC to use the film for recruitment purposes.

At the film's San Francisco premiere on January 11, 1951, a large number of volunteer recruits were inducted into the Marines and proceeds were donated to the Marine Corps League.

The film was released during the midst of the Korean War. On the day of the Hollywood premiere, United Nations forces were driven from Seoul by communist troops in the pivotal Third Battle of Seoul.

== Reception ==
In a contemporary review for The New York Times, critic Bosley Crowther called the film "a remarkably real and agonizing demonstration of the horribleness or war" and wrote:

Pulling no punches in recording the dirty and gory details of beach-crashing, foot-slogging warfare and what it does to the minds and emotions or men, this Technicolored drama about a strike by United States Marines against an island in the Pacific is one of the best of the latter-day war films. And when we say that, we are commending not only the technical skill and the unrelenting candor of those who did the job, but also the courage of their convictions in bringing it to the screen at this time. ... In many respects, this compact drama is reminiscent of "A Walk in the Sun," the harrowing history of a patrol at Salerno, which Mr. Milestone directed six years ago. But in this film, the span is a little broader, the violence is more vivid and intense and the comprehensions of human tension are somewhat more abstruse and involved. Psychoses of fear and hate are mingled dramatically among the men, and their distaste for taking prisoners becomes a motivating factor in the plot. Indeed, the concentration of the writer and the director toward the end upon a drama of interrogation, to build suspense, is the one weakness of the film. Here it takes on the appearance, for a short while, of a studio-made film. Otherwise, the production is tremendous.

Critic Edwin Schallert of the Los Angeles Times wrote:

Only the issue of the horror of war which the picture brings out so realistically may stand in the way or its popular acclaim. That depends entirely on the public's mood. The mood is grim and powerful to the last degree, the bloody business being emphasized by the Technicolor photography. The honesty of the enterprise makes it so highly deserving of attention that possibly the more terrifying aspects or the production will not stand against it in the long run. ... Apart from the grim side, the film develops a fascinating mystery motif. The tortuous difficulties through which a solution is reached and the source of the rocket attack finally bombed make a fascinating story thread.
