= United States Coast Guard Band =

U.S. Coast Guard Band
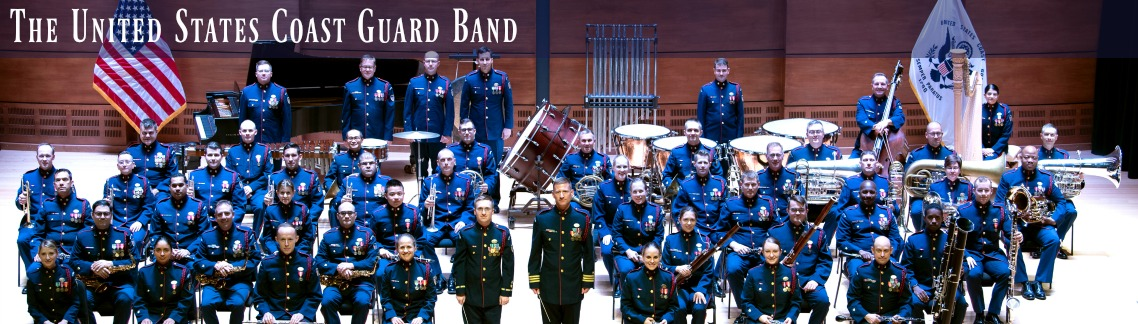
- The U.S. Coast Guard Band pictured in 2019.
- Active: 1925 to Present
- Country: United States
- Branch: U.S. Coast Guard
- Type: Military band
- Role: Public duties
- Size: 55
- Part of: USCG Office of Public Affairs
- Garrison/HQ: New London, Connecticut
- Colors: Coast Guard Blue
- Decorations: Coast Guard Unit Commendation
- Website: http://www.uscg.mil/band/

Commanders
- Director: CAPT Adam Williamson
- Assistant Director: CWO Jeffrey A. Spenner
- Drum Major: MUCM Brian Nichols
- Conductor Laureate: CAPT Lewis J. Buckley (ret.)

Insignia
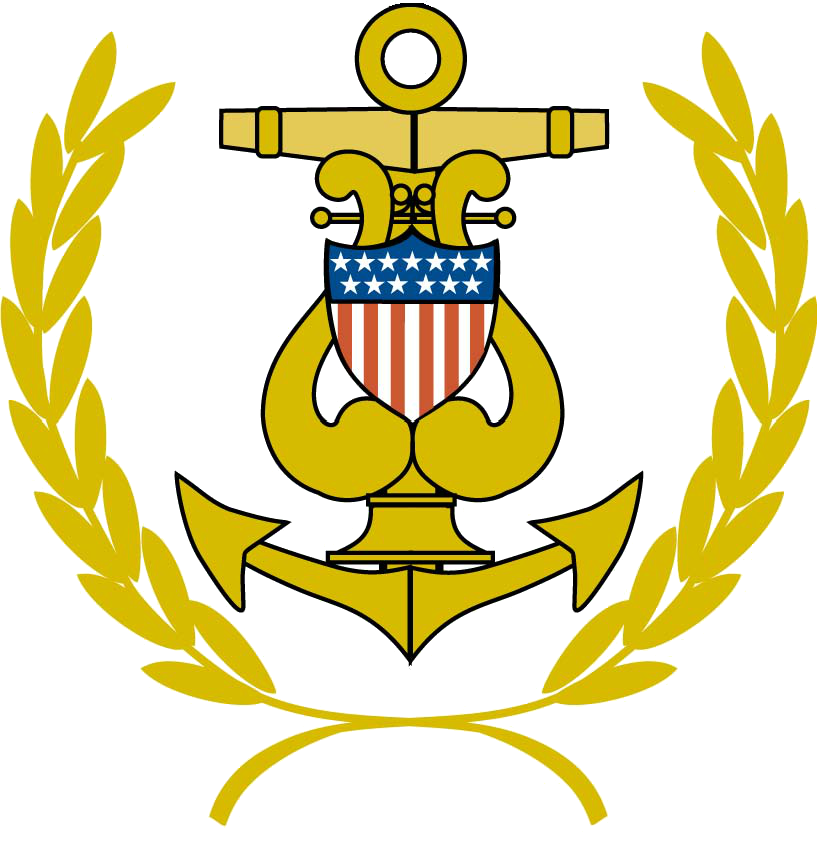
- Emblem

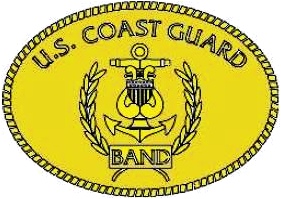
- Service Identification Badge

The United States Coast Guard Band is the premier band representing the United States Coast Guard and the Department of Homeland Security. Established in 1925, the Coast Guard Band is stationed at the U.S. Coast Guard Academy in New London, Connecticut. The Band frequently appears in Washington, D.C., at presidential and cabinet-level functions on formal and informal occasions. Once a year, it undertakes national and international tours to promote the Coast Guard.

As of 2016, the U.S. Coast Guard Band is the Coast Guard's only professional musical ensemble (a second branch band, the U.S. Coast Guard Pipe Band, is an auxiliary-staffed organization).

== History ==
=== Founding and early years ===
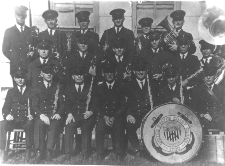
An early photograph of the U.S. Coast Guard Band

In March 1925, the Coast Guard Band was organized with the assistance of Lt. Charles Benter, leader of the U.S. Navy Band, Dr. Walter Damrosch, conductor of the New York Philharmonic, and John Philip Sousa, former director of the U.S. Marine Band. At the time of its establishment, it was primarily as a ceremonial unit responsible for supporting cadet activities at the U.S. Coast Guard Academy, where it was stationed. In 1931 the Coast Guard Band was the principal military band for two of the days of the week-long observances of the sesquicentennial of the British surrender at Yorktown: 17 October, thematically designated "Revolution Day", and 18 October, designated "Religion Day".

=== World War II ===
An influx of new personnel into the Coast Guard during World War II stretched the band's capabilities and, for the first time, additional bands were raised by the Coast Guard to support stateside ceremonial and training requirements of the expanding force. In May 1943 an all-women's band, the Coast Guard SPAR Band, was activated at the Palm Beach SPAR Training Station. The Palm Beach SPAR Band, which had a strength of 35 personnel, was transferred to Washington, DC in 1945. While there it performed in the triumphal parade held for Admiral Chester Nimitz and participated in the mourning ceremonies for President of the United States Franklin Roosevelt, assigned to perform dirges at Union Station for the arrival of the funeral train carrying the president's body. The SPAR Band was deactivated in 1946.

In addition to the Coast Guard SPAR Band, bands were activated in many Coast Guard districts for the duration of hostilities. The 11th District Band enlisted Rudy Vallée as its bandmaster (during World War I Vallee had served in the U.S. Navy for three months before being expelled after it was discovered he was 15 years old). Like the SPAR Band, the district bands were phased out after the end of the war, the Coast Guard Band returning to its status as the service's sole musical unit.

=== Post-war ===
In 1965 the Coast Guard Band was chartered by Congress as the official band of the entire service and was given parity with other U.S. military "premier ensembles". In 1976, and again in 1981, the Coast Guard proposed moving the band to Washington, D.C. Petition drives by citizens of Connecticut prevented the moves.

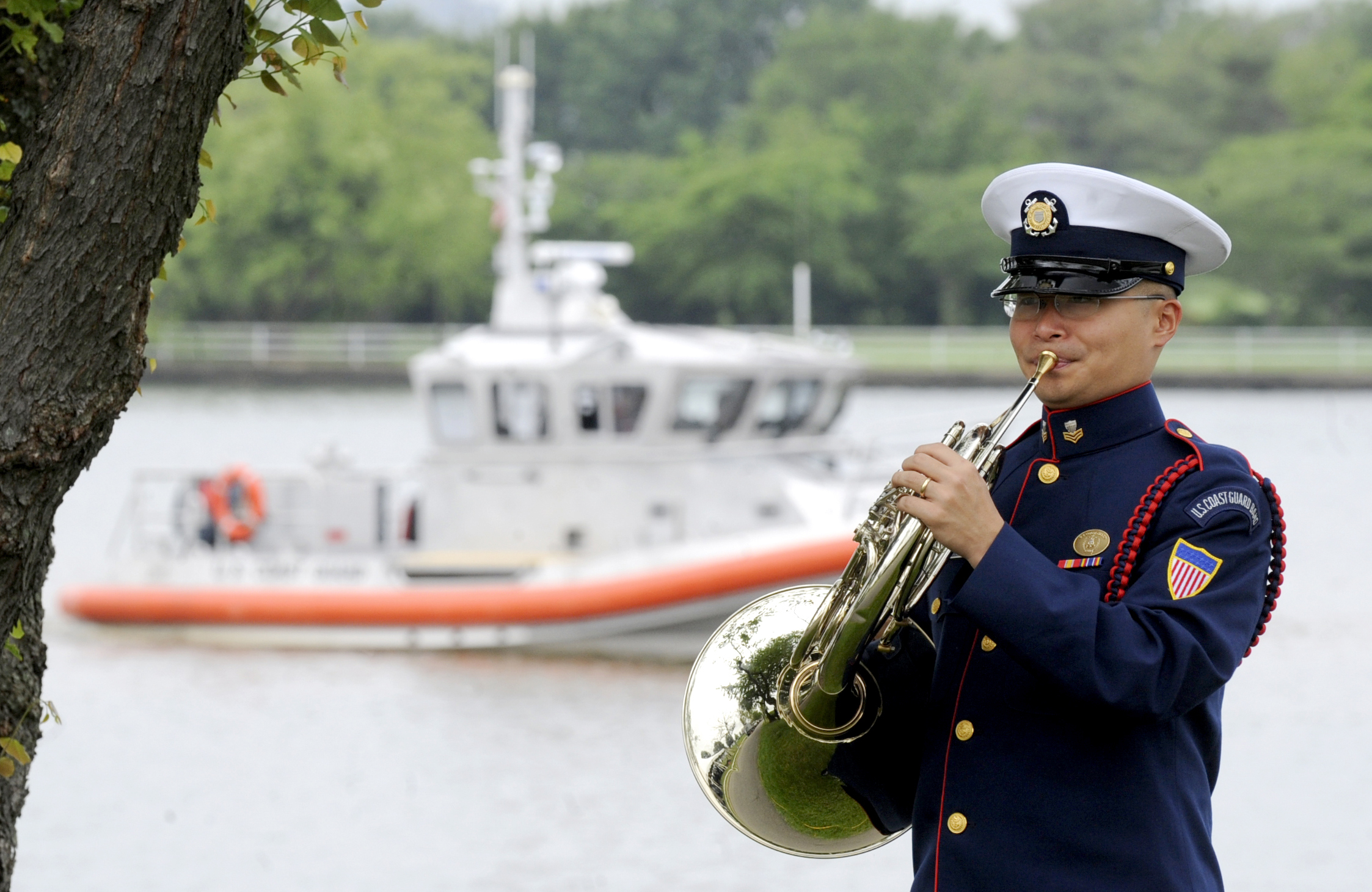
A Coast Guard bandsman warms-up prior to a change-of-command ceremony in 2010.

Lewis J. Buckley assumed command of the Coast Guard Band in 1975 as the group's fifth director. Leading the band for 29 years, until 2004, Buckley retired as the longest-serving conductor of a major military service band in American history.

=== Modern era ===
In 1989 the Coast Guard Band became the first U.S. military band to perform in the Soviet Union and, in 2016 the Coast Guard Band performed at the debut of "The Finest Hours" at Mann's Chinese Theater, the first time the band had performed at the debut of major motion picture.

In late 2015 the Coast Guard began another study about the feasibility of relocating the band from its traditional station in New London, Connecticut to Washington, DC. The proposal to relocate the band has been opposed by United States Senator Richard Blumenthal.

After the creation of the United States Space Force in December 2019, the Coast Guard Band played a central role in developing the Space Force's official song, "Semper Supra." After singer-songwriter James Teachenor, a former member of the United States Air Force Band at the United States Air Force Academy, wrote the lyrics and composed the melody for "Semper Supra" and received suggested arrangements and finishing touches for it from 12 military bands, he collaborated with Chief Musician Sean Nelson, a trombonist and staff arranger with the Coast Guard Band. Nelson completed the song with harmonies and orchestration, adding more than 30 instrumental parts. "I became familiar with the other branches' songs, but I wanted this one to have its own modern spin to reflect what the Space Force is — modern, new and very advanced," Nelson said. The Coast Guard Band recorded Nelson's arrangement of the song for review by the Space Force. After months of coordination between the Space Force and Coast Guard Band to further develop and revise the song and variations of it, the Space Force chose the final version of "Semper Supra." The song was unveiled in a public performance by members of the U.S. Air Force Band on 20 September 2022, at the 2022 Air & Space Forces Association Air, Space and Cyber Conference at National Harbor, Maryland. Teachenor and Nelson gifted "Semper Supra" and the copyright to its music and lyrics to the United States Department of the Air Force.

== Organization ==
Almost all personnel of the Coast Guard Band are assigned to the ceremonial and concert bands, the group's primary performance units. The band, however, maintains several chamber music groups to provide specialized performance capabilities to which some personnel are co-assigned. This includes a woodwind quintet, a brass quintet, a Dixieland jazz band, a saxophone quartet, a woodwind trio, and a flute and harp duo.

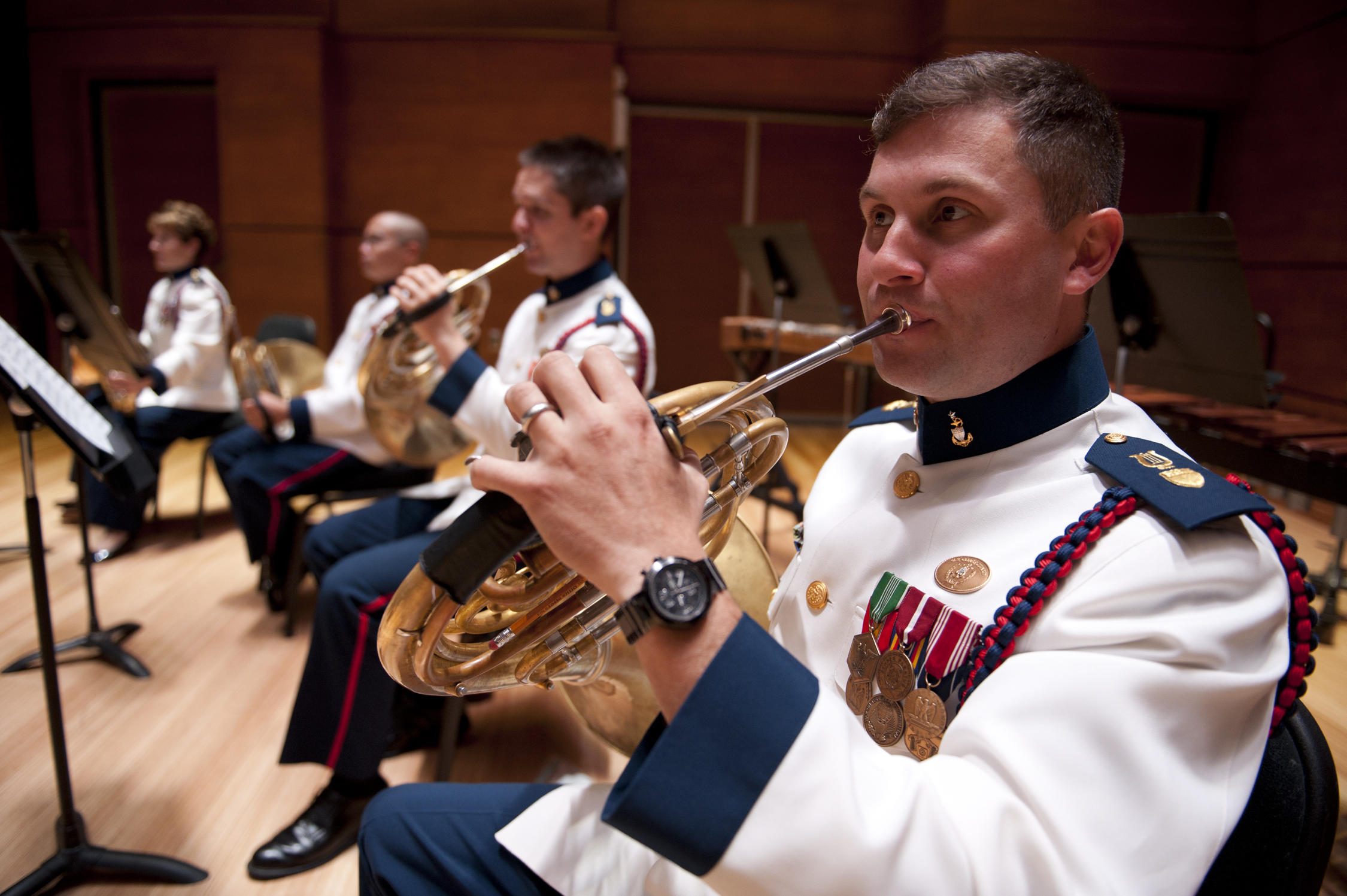
A Coast Guard horn player wearing the concert ceremonial dress in 2011.

According to the Coast Guard, competition for its limited vacancies is fierce, and many new Coast Guardsmen enlisting as musicians are conservatory-trained with degrees from elite institutions including the Juilliard School, Eastman School of Music, and the New England Conservatory. A number of its members also perform with the Eastern Connecticut Symphony Orchestra, the Hartford Symphony, and the New Haven Symphony.

Operationally located at Leamy Hall at the U.S. Coast Guard Academy, the band has billets for 54 instrumentalists and command staff, and one vocalist. Its vocalist billet has traditionally been filled by a female singer.

== Uniforms and equipment ==
In addition to regular Coast Guard uniforms, the Coast Guard Band is authorized wear of special ceremonial dress consisting of navy blouses with banded collars and shoulder boards, and a multi-colored aiguillette. A second distinctive uniform, the "concert ceremonial dress uniform," is patterned in white with blue highlights such as shoulder boards and cuffs.

== Music ==
Semper Paratus, performed by the Coast Guard Band.

Vasily Agapkin's Farewell of Slavianka, performed by the Coast Guard Band.

Lewis J. Buckley's The Tall Ship Eagle, performed by the Coast Guard Band.

Herbert L. Clarke's The Bride of the Waves, performed by the Coast Guard Band. Euphonium Soloist David Werden.

== Selected discography ==
- Blue & Gray Songs of the Civil War 2003 by The United States Coast Guard Band

== See also ==
- United States military bands
- U.S. Coast Guard Ceremonial Honor Guard
- U.S. Coast Guard Pipe Band
