= Semper Supra (march) =

Official march of the United States Space Force

English: Always Above
- Organizational anthem of the United States Space Force
- Lyrics: James Teachenor, 2022
- Music: James Teachenor and Sean Nelson, 2022
- Adopted: 2022; 4 years ago

"Semper Supra" (Latin for 'always above') is the official march of the United States Space Force, composed in 2022 by James Teachenor and Sean Nelson.

== Etymology ==
"Semper Supra" is named after the U.S. Space Force's official motto, Semper Supra. After the creation of the U.S. Space Force on December 20, 2019, United States Air Force Senior Airman Daniel Sanchez – who researched the mottos of other military branches and chose "Semper Supra" because of both its ease of pronunciation and the alliteration of both the Latin phrase and its English translation "Always Above" – proposed the motto, and the U.S. Space Force officially adopted it on July 22, 2020.

== History ==
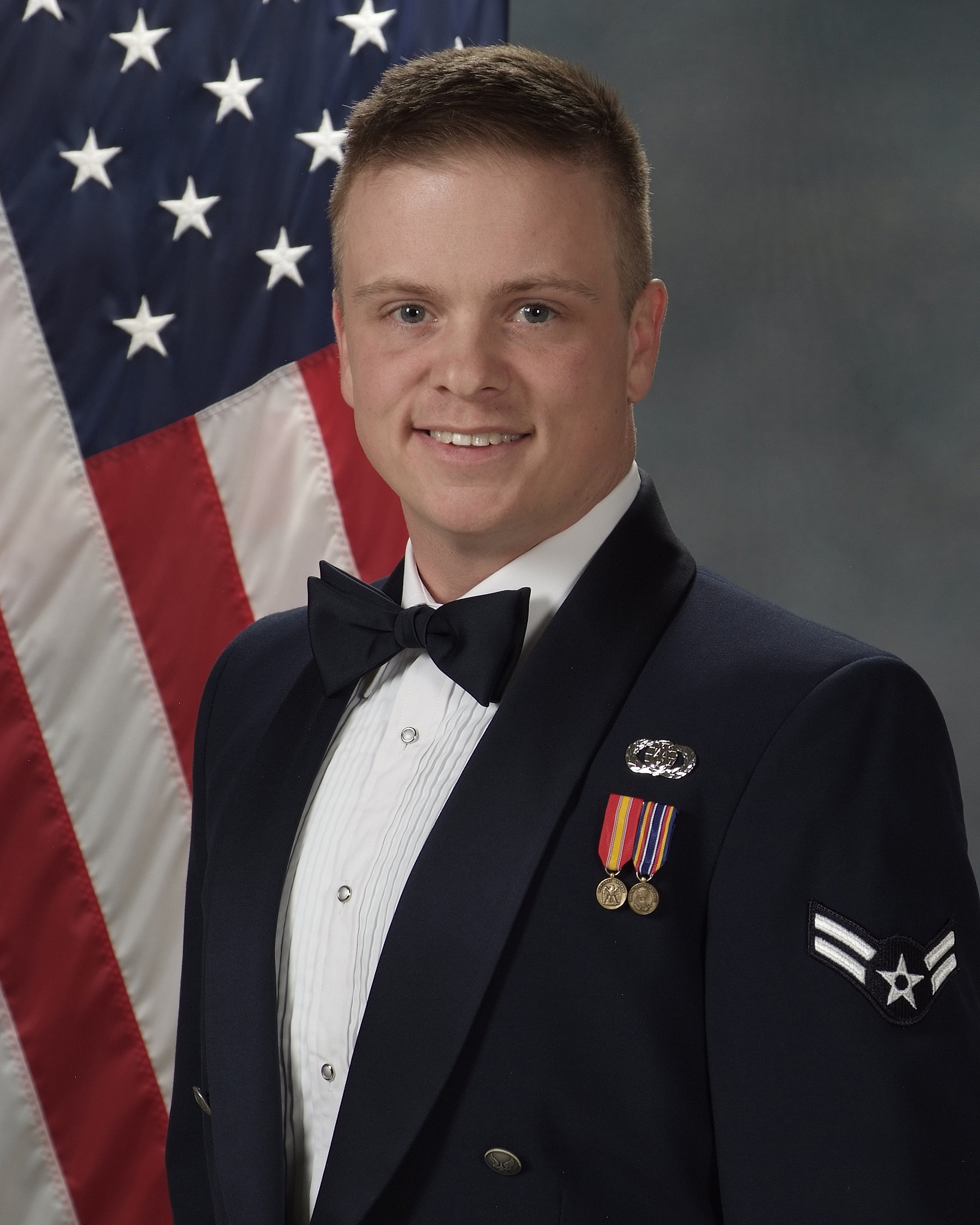
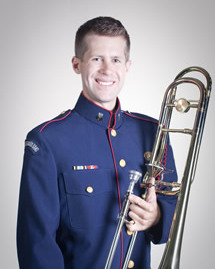
James Teachenor (left) and Sean Nelson (right).

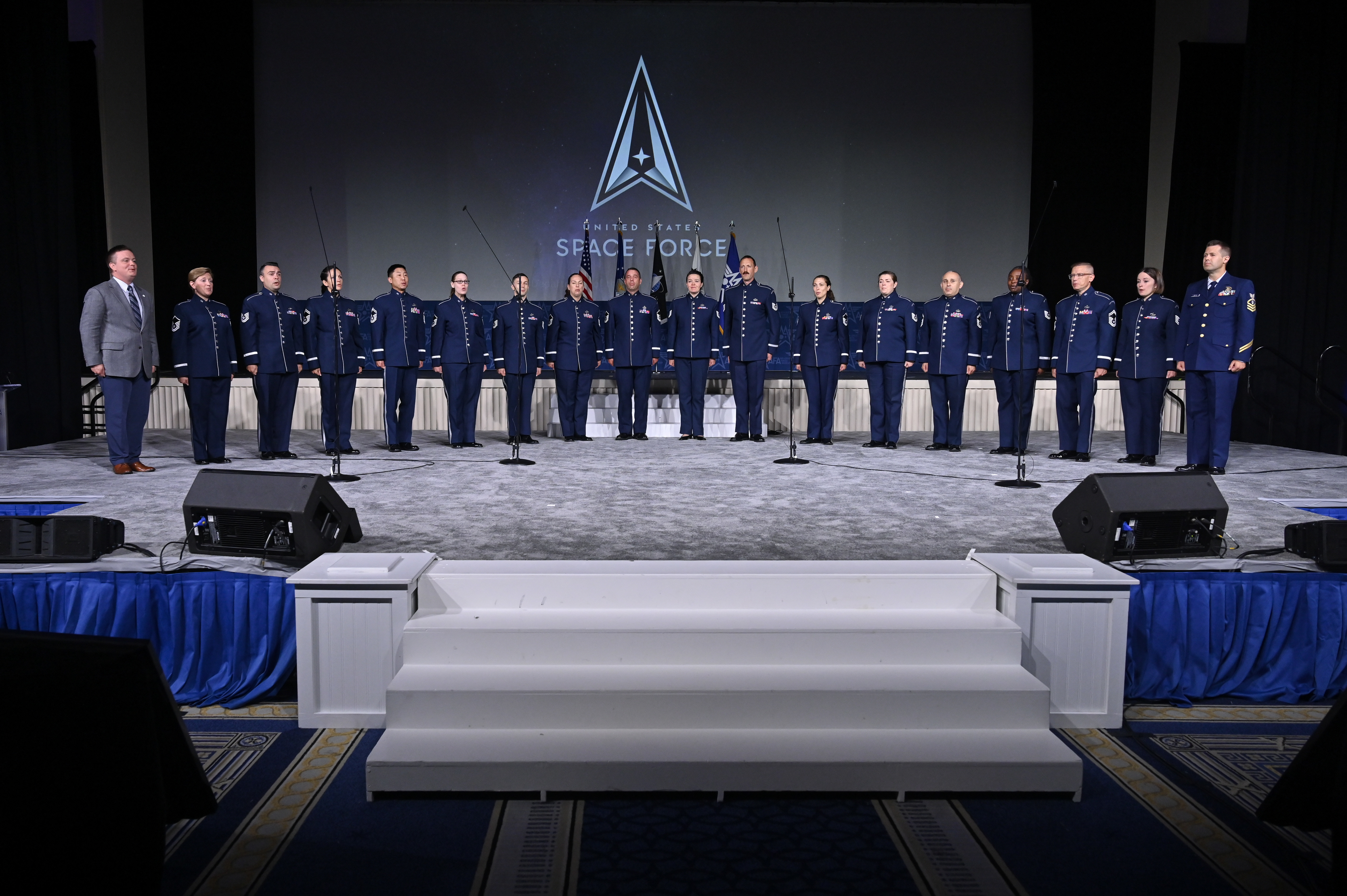
Members of the United States Air Force Band and a guest singer give the first public performance of "Semper Supra" at National Harbor, Maryland, on September 20, 2022.

Singer-songwriter James Teachenor, a former member of the United States Air Force Band at the United States Air Force Academy, wrote the lyrics and composed the melody for Semper Supra. Upon the creation of the Space Force in December 2019, he began working with the Chief of Space Operations, General John W. "Jay" Raymond, to start the process of writing the song. He explained, "The song was a long work in progress because I wanted it to encompass all the capabilities that the Space Force offers and its vision."

Teachenor sent the melody and lyrics to various U.S. military bands for them to suggest arrangements and finishing touches, and the bands submitted 12 different arrangements for consideration. Teachenor then collaborated with Chief Musician Sean Nelson, a trombonist and staff arranger with the United States Coast Guard Band. Nelson completed the song with harmonies and orchestration, adding more than 30 instrumental parts. "I became familiar with the other branches' songs, but I wanted this one to have its own modern spin to reflect what the Space Force is – modern, new, and very advanced," Nelson said. The U.S. Coast Guard Band recorded Nelson's arrangement of the song for review by the Space Force. After months of coordination between the Space Force and Coast Guard Band to further develop and revise the song and variations of it, the Space Force chose the final version of "Semper Supra."

The song was unveiled in a public performance by members of the U.S. Air Force Band and a guest singer on September 20, 2022, during a speech Raymond gave at the 2022 Air & Space Forces Association Air, Space and Cyber Conference at National Harbor, Maryland. In announcing the Space Force's adoption of the song as its service anthem, Raymond explained, "We wanted a song that spoke to our guardians [the Space Force's term for its personnel], that brought to life our motto, 'Semper Supra.' And it all comes together into something that I hope guardians around the world will be proud of." Raymond added, "This is a once-in-a-lifetime opportunity to establish a Space Force song that will be part of our culture and heritage for years to come. Our traditions are part of the fabric that weave us all together as we execute our missions side-by-side; I will be proud to sing 'Semper Supra' alongside my fellow guardians."

In announcing the selection of the song, the United States Department of the Air Force stated, "It was created to capture the esprit de corps of both current and future Guardians, and intends to bring together service members by giving them a sense of pride."

== Interim use of "The Invincible Eagle" by Sousa ==
Before adopting “Semper Supra” as its official service song in September 2022, the Space Force used an excerpt of “The Invincible Eagle,” composed by John Philip Sousa in 1901, as its official interim march. It was adopted in 2020. The portion of the march used was named "The U.S. Space Force March" and was to be played for "ceremonies and gatherings of the USSF and anywhere a musical representation of America’s Space Professionals [was] needed."

== Lyrics ==
We’re the mighty watchful eye,
Guardians beyond the blue,
The invisible front line,
Warfighters brave and true.

Boldly reaching into space,
There's no limit to our sky.
Standing guard both night and day,
We’re the Space Force from on high.

== Copyright ==
Teachenor and Nelson gifted "Semper Supra" and the copyright to its music and lyrics to the U.S. Department of the Air Force, which is the exclusive owner of the copyright.

== Critical reviews ==
Immediate media reaction to the song was mixed. On September 22, 2022, Stephen Thompson on All Things Considered on NPR commented, "My immediate thought went to Team America: World Police. (...) Or like something out of, like, a G.I. Joe cartoon." A New York Times article on September 21, 2022, commented that while trying to "shoot for the stars," the musical number leaves something to be desired.

== See also ==
- "Marines' Hymn"
- "The U.S. Air Force"
- "Anchors Aweigh"
- "The Army Goes Rolling Along"
- "Semper Paratus"
