= The U.S. Air Force Blue =

Composition by Alan Scott and Keith Textor
- Language: English
- Written: 1957

"The U.S. Air Force Blue"
- Performed by the U.S. Air Force Band in 2014: file; help

"The U.S. Air Force Blue" is a song associated with the United States Air Force. Composed in 1957 as an advertising jingle for recruiting ads, the song's popularity subsequently saw it receive wider use. As of 2019, it is listed in the Air Force Manual as an authorized piece of ceremonial music.

== History ==
"The U.S. Air Force Blue", composed in 1957 by Alan Scott and Keith Textor of the commercial music production company Scott-Textor Productions, was commissioned by the United States Air Force for use as a recruiting jingle. The song, appearing in television advertisements for the Air Force, was set to imagery of airborne North American F-86 Sabres and a Boeing B-52 Stratofortress taking off in cloud of smoke. The copyright to the words and music for the song were subsequently purchased by the Air Force and released into the public domain; Mitch Miller rearranged "The U.S. Air Force Blue" at a march tempo, the sheet music to which was distributed to both Air Force bands, and civilian bands and orchestras in the United States On February 3, 1957, Miller recorded "The U.S. Air Force Blue" during this CBS Radio show during which Lt. Gen. Emmett "Rosie" O'Donnell, Jr. – commander of the Pacific Air Forces – appeared as guest.

The song's popularity was such that, soon after introduction, an unsuccessful effort was made to replace "The U.S. Air Force" with "The U.S. Air Force Blue" as the Air Force's official service song. Nonetheless, as of 2018, "The U.S. Air Force Blue" remains an authorized piece of music in U.S. Air Force ceremonies and, according to the Air Force, "the popularity of the song remains and it is performed regularly".

"The U.S. Air Force Blue" played on television in 1957.

== Interpretation and significance ==
Writing in 1974, Richard Grid Powers quoted the lyrics of "The U.S. Air Force Blue" in his description of the organizational imagery and theory of the Air Force, which he described as counter-military, hyper-rationalist, aspiring to a "pure model of bureaucracy", and intentionally obliviating historical references in favor of a vision of the future in which air power was glorified to the exclusion of all else and in which "everything is where it ought to be ... [and] mankind has prevailed".

== Lyrics (original) ==
The original lyrics to "The U.S. Air Force Blue" have been modified in later performances to introduce gender neutral language.

They took the blue from the skies
And a pretty girl's eyes
And a touch of Old Glory's hue,
And gave it to the men who proudly wear
The U. S. Air Force Blue,
The U. S. Air Force Blue.

Oh they are men with a dream
On America's team
They're a rugged and ready crew,
And you can bet your boots
The world looks up
To U. S. Air Force Blue,
To U. S. Air Force Blue.

They know where they're going,
They set their course,
The sky's no limit in the Air Force.

== See also ==
- Be All You Can Be
- Music of the NOAA Corps
- "The U.S. Air Force," official song of the US Air Force
