= USRC Yamacraw =

Steel-hull flush-deck cutter

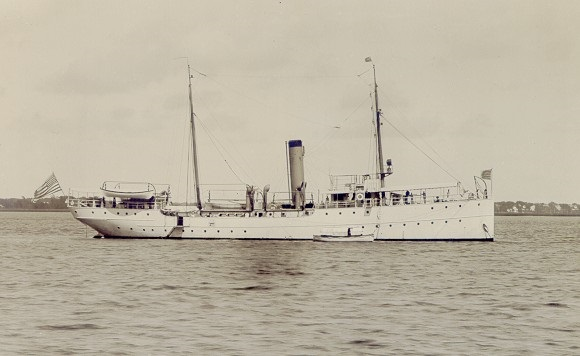
- Yamacraw circa 1914

History

United States
- Name: USRC Yamacraw; USCGC Yamacraw (after 1915)
- Namesake: Native American tribe that settled near Savannah, Georgia
- Builder: New York Shipbuilding, Camden, New Jersey
- Cost: $200,000 (USD)
- Launched: 24 October 1909
- Commissioned: 17 May 1910
- Decommissioned: 11 December 1937
- Home port: Savannah, Georgia (1910-1916)
- Fate: Sold 13 April 1938

General characteristics
- Displacement: 1080 tons
- Length: 191 ft 8 in (58.42 m)
- Beam: 32 ft 6 in (9.91 m)
- Draft: 13 ft (4.0 m)
- Propulsion: Triple expansion steam engine,18",29",47" dia. x 30" stroke
- Speed: 14 knots
- Range: 3,500 miles at 8 knots
- Complement: 8 officers, 65 enlisted
- Armament: 4 × 6-pound rapid fire guns (1909); 2 × 3"/50 cal. naval guns (After 1930)
- Notes: The original lyrics for Semper Paratus, the U.S. Coast Guard march, were written by Captain Francis Saltus Van Boskerck in 1922, aboard the USCGC Yamacraw in Savannah, Georgia.

USRC Yamacraw, was a steel-hull flush-deck cutter that served in the United States Revenue Cutter Service from 1909 to 1937 and was the sister ship to the USRC Tahoma.

== History ==
She was launched on 24 October 1908 by New York Shipbuilding at Camden, New Jersey. Her homeport was Savannah, Georgia where she enforced customs laws, conducted search and rescue operations and destroyed derelict vessels. After the start of World War I she also enforced neutrality laws along the eastern seaboard. During a search and rescue attempt on 4 March 1917 assisting the steamer Louisiana run aground near Ocean City, Maryland, the Yamacraw lost 10 of her crew. Several citations for heroism were awarded posthumously. After the United States declared war on Germany on 6 April 1917, Yamacraw was assigned to the U.S. Navy but retained her Coast Guard crew. She served as a patrol vessel in the Chesapeake Bay to Nantucket Shoals area until called for convoy duty to Europe. During convoy missions escorting merchant vessels she performed a rescue, saving four survivors of a torpedo attack. On escort duty Yamacraw cruised over 36,000 miles. Upon return to Coast Guard control after the war, she returned to routine patrol work at Savannah. In the spring of 1921 she served as part of the International Ice Patrol, returning to Savannah after July. After the passage of Prohibition, she took an active role in law enforcement along the southeastern coast. Yamacraw was decommissioned at Curtis Bay, Maryland on 11 December 1937 and sold for $10,300 on 13 April 1938 to Merritt-Chapman-Scott Corporation.
