= Ingham incident =

1835 Mexican-American naval battle

Coordinates: 26.0352°N 97.1385°W

Ingham Incident
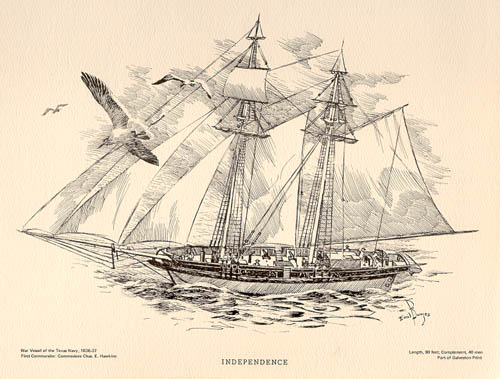
- USRC Ingham while serving in the Texas Navy.
Date	June 14, 1835; 191 years ago
Location	Gulf of Mexico, off Brazos Santiago, Texas
Result	United States victory

Belligerents
United States	Mexico

Commanders and leaders
Ezekiel Jones	Juan Calvi

Strength
1 schooner	1 schooner

Casualties and losses
None	None; 1 schooner grounded

The Ingham Incident, or the Montezuma Affair, was a naval battle fought in 1835, the first between Mexico and the United States. The Mexican warship Montezuma patrolled the coast of Texas to prevent the smuggling of contraband into the territory. During the cruise, the Mexicans captured the American merchant ship Martha and later the Texan ship Columbia which led to a response by the United States Revenue-Marine revenue cutter USRC Ingham. A bloodless engagement was fought on June 14, and ended when the Montezuma was purposely run aground to prevent capture.

== Background ==
The conflict began at Galveston on May 7 of 1835 before the outbreak of fighting between the Texans and the Mexicans. That day the Mexican Navy schooner Montezuma, under the command of Lieutenant Juan Calvi, seized the American schooner Martha for "customs violations" and because the passengers were not carrying passports, they were arrested and put in the brig. Two of the passengers, Thomas J. and Francis S. Early, were the sons of the former Governor Peter Early of Georgia. The brothers recalled that on previous encounters in Mexico the authorities did not ask for passports so they assumed they didn't need one. Ten days later Calvi captured the Texan ship Columbia for similar infractions. Both incidents sparked anger in Texas and a debate on whether the seizures were legal. The smuggling of contraband into Texas had become a major concern to the Mexicans by 1835, according to author William R. Wells II, most American and Texan ships were involved in the illegal trade and openly defiant of the Mexican laws against such activities. Mill equipment owned by Robert Wilson was part of the cargo aboard the Martha when she was taken. Wells sent a message about the outrage to Lieutenant Colonel William B. Travis.

Travis responded with a letter dated July 7, informing Wilson that the revenue cutter USRC Ingham had been dispatched by Customs Agent James W. Breedlove, as she was the only armed American naval ship in the western Gulf of Mexico. The Ingham was cruising the Mississippi River south of New Orleans when her commander, Captain Ezekiel Jones, received orders to sail to Texas. Though the seizures of the two ships were deemed legal by the Texans and the Americans, a critical press, politics, and the "unofficial urging" of the use of force by President Andrew Jackson eventually resulted in the operation and a subsequent naval battle. Due to an incident at Havana, Cuba, sometime before, Agent Breedlove attempted to establish an American naval force in the western Gulf by claiming that a slave ship was sailing from Havana to Texas but his scheme was thwarted by Assistant Navy Secretary John Boyle. One vessel was dispatched, the USS St. Louis, which sailed for Cuba where her commander discovered that the so-called slave ship was carrying free negroes to Brazoria.

The official report states that Captain Jones was sailing the Ingham on a twenty-five-day cruise for an anti-slavery operation, though his real intentions were to liberate the captured ships and the American citizens. Upon reaching the Sabine River, Jones patrolled the area for a few days for slavers before crossing into Mexican waters disguised as a merchantman. First the captain sailed past Galveston for Matagorda, Texas, but heavy seas prevented him from entering so Jones headed for the Brazos River, where on June 3 he was informed by a local pilot that "several Acts of Piracy" had been committed by the Montezuma and that there were no slave ships in the area. Captain Jones sent a landing party ashore to uncover the truth of these claims and he ordered that the three vessels in port be examined, none of which were found to be carrying slaves. Following that the Americans cruised back to Matagorda and crossed the bar on June 5; two more ships were boarded but they were found to be legal. At the same time a crewman from one of the merchant ships informed the Americans that a vessel with 100 slaves on board was expected to arrive at Matagorda shortly.

Jones discounted this rumor and continued his search of the bay for the "Montezuma," which was suspected to be in the area. Another shore party was landed with the mission of investigating various rumors about the Martha affair and to recruit spies to report on the Montezuma's presence. Ultimately USRC Ingham would sail the Texas coast for another two weeks without finding the Mexican schooner. Jones used the time to board suspected slavers and to drill his men for a possible encounter with the Montezuma. Eventually Jones decided to head for Matamoros on June 12 "with the avowed intention of seeking the Montezuma."

== Incident ==
A Morris-Taney class cutter, possibly the USRC Ingham

On June 13, the Ingham passed the bar at Passo Cabello where she struck the ground several times, so a pilot was hired to take the ship to Brazos Santiago which was reached on July 14. While six miles off the port, Jones proceeded with caution by having "all hands preparing grape shot & getting the Battery in fighting order & exercising the great guns & small arms." At 5:00 pm Jones tacked toward shore and a lookout sighted a vessel anchored off Brazos Santiago. An hour later the vessel was identified as a "clipper built Schooner" and at 6:30 the vessel hoisted sails and "bore down" on the Ingham. Ten minutes after that the Mexicans opened fire on the Americans with one shot and at 7:40 her crew raised their ensign, revealing that the vessel was a warship. According to Captain Jones, he returned the Mexican's fire only after receiving it, though it remains unknown as to who fired the first shots. The former master of the captured Texan ship Colombia was on board the Montezuma throughout the incident and he claimed that the Mexicans opened fire after the Ingham discharged a lee gun as a signal to communicate. Jones reported that Lieutenant Calvi must have thought the Ingham was a merchant ship due to the disguise and as soon as he realized that the American ship was armed, he "hauled his wind & made all sail from us." The Americans were now chasing the Montezuma and they opened fire with a 9-pounder chaser to prevent the Mexicans from moving into position for a broadside.

After that Lieutenant Calvi had his men open fire again, making Jones believe that a battle had begun in earnest so he slowed his ship to allow the Ingham's broadside guns to be brought into action. Calvi exploited this opportunity to disengage and he headed for the shore, jettisoning gear and weapons along the way to lighten the schooner, increase her speed, and to shorten the vessel's draft in order to cross the bars of the Rio Grande. Calvi, for unknown reasons, did not sail into port; instead he anchored with his broadside facing the Ingham. The alarm was also raised and Mexican Army troops reinforced the Montezuma. Soon after that the Mexicans were back in sail and they resumed their firing on the American cutter. Calvi stayed close to shore so the remainder of the engagement was a long range gunnery duel. Captain Jones attempted to cut the Mexicans off by getting in between the Montezuma and the harbor's entrance but Calvi was "too far to the leeward" for that to be done. By 12:00 the Mexicans were unable to escape the pursuing Ingham so Clavi chose to run his ship "into the Breakers & on the Bar" which caused heavy damage to the Montezuma. Jones considered shelling the wreck but he later decided against this and broke off the action now that the enemy was no longer a threat.

American forces discharged only thirteen shots during the entire battle according to Jones' report; he did not mention how many rounds the Mexicans had fired. In the following months, an anonymous person claimed that the Ingham had purposely remained out of the Montezuma's range; this was contested by a sailor named Harby, who commanded the ship's guns. Harby said that the Mexican schooner was within "easy reach" of his last six shots and that Captain Jones had ordered that the Montezuma should not be struck but, if possible, intimidated. There were no casualties on either side. After the battle, Jones sailed back for New Orleans where he prepared for another expedition with the objective of capturing the Mexican warship Correo de Mexico. However, hostilities broke out in Texas first and the rebels engaged and captured the Correo de Mexico on September 1 off Brazoria. The American prisoners captured by Lieutenant Calvi were all released on June 15 and the cruise of the Ingham was declared a success. A newspaper called the Ingham "Semper Paratus" for her response to the Martha affair and the term would eventually become the motto of the United States Coast Guard. The Ingham was later sold to the Texas Navy and renamed Independence.

== See also ==
- "Semper Paratus" – the official march of the United States Coast Guard
- Crawford Affair
- Single ship action
- Gunboat diplomacy
