= USRC Ingham (1832) =

U.S. Coast Guard cutter

History

United States
- Namesake: Samuel D. Ingham
- Builder: Webb and Allen, New York
- Laid down: 1830
- Launched: 1832
- Commissioned: 1832
- Decommissioned: 10 January 1836
- Home port: New Orleans, Louisiana, Baltimore, Maryland
- Nickname(s): Semper Paratus
- Fate: transferred to the Texas Navy renamed Independence

General characteristics
- Class & type: Schooner
- Displacement: 112 tons
- Length: 73.4 ft (22.4 m)
- Beam: 20.6 ft (6.3 m)
- Draught: 9.7 ft (3.0 m)
- Propulsion: wind
- Complement: 20-24
- Armament: 6-9 pndrs
- Notes: Texas Revolution; Ingham Incident; Battle of Brazos River

The United States Revenue Cutter Ingham was one of the 13 Coast Guard cutters of the Morris-Taney class. Named for Secretary of the Treasury Samuel D. Ingham, she was the first United States warship to engage a Mexican ship in combat; and for her service in that battle, a newspaper called her Semper Paratus (always ready), which later became the motto of the United States Coast Guard. Ingham was sold in 1836 to the Republic of Texas and served in the Texas Navy until she was captured as a prize-of-war by Mexico and was rechristened Independencia.

== History of the cutter ==
The Morris-Taney class cutters were the backbone of the Revenue Cutter Service for more than a decade from 1830 to 1840. Samuel Humphreys designed these cutters for roles as diverse as fighting pirates, privateers, combating smugglers and operating with naval forces. He designed the vessels on a naval schooner concept. They had Baltimore Clipper lines. The vessels were built by Webb and Allen, and designed by Isaac Webb. They resembled Humphreys' design, but had one less port.

== Career ==
The Ingham was initially stationed at New Orleans, Louisiana. She did a short term of duty in Baltimore, Maryland during late 1831 and returned to duty in New Orleans in January 1832.

The revenue cutters in New Orleans were increasingly monitoring the situation in Texas, because settlers and merchant traffic between the United States and the Mexican province of Texas mostly traveled by sea and usually through New Orleans. Starting in 1835, the central Mexican government attempted to collect excise taxes and disrupt trafficking in slaves into Texas. This led to seizures of Texan-owned and American-owned and flagged vessels, the most famous being the American merchant ship Martha. She was seized on 7 May 1835, by the Mexican schooner Montezuma and the Americans on board were held as prisoners.

The Ingham, under Captain Ezekiel Jones, was dispatched to the Texas coast to monitor the situation and on 14 June, near Brazos Santiago, Montezuma fired on Ingham and the fire was returned. There is some discrepancy as to whether the Mexican warship was trying to evade battle once she realized the identity of the ship she had fired on, but Captain Jones did not allow Montezuma to evade the battle. Eventually the Mexican schooner ran aground and Ingham broke off the battle, having fired 13 guns. These became the first conflict between Mexican and United States forces and are considered by some historians as the first broadside of the Texas Revolution. The following day General Martin Cos ordered the release of the Martha's passengers.

In January 1836 the Ingham was sold to the Republic of Texas for $1,710 and Captain Jones was duly transferred to another command within the Revenue Service. The newspaper, the New Orleans Bee wrote about Jones, "his prompt and efficient action in the affair of the Montezuma, has taught a neighboring state a valuable lesson of respect for our flag..." and concerning the Ingham, the paper wrote, "the vessel is entitled to bear the best motto for a military public servant—SEMPER PARATUS." The United States Revenue Cutter Service would adopt Semper Paratus (always ready) as their motto in 1896.

== Subsequent career ==
Ingham became the Independence in the Texas Navy, and was later captured by the Mexicans and renamed the Independencia.
