= List of marches by John Philip Sousa =

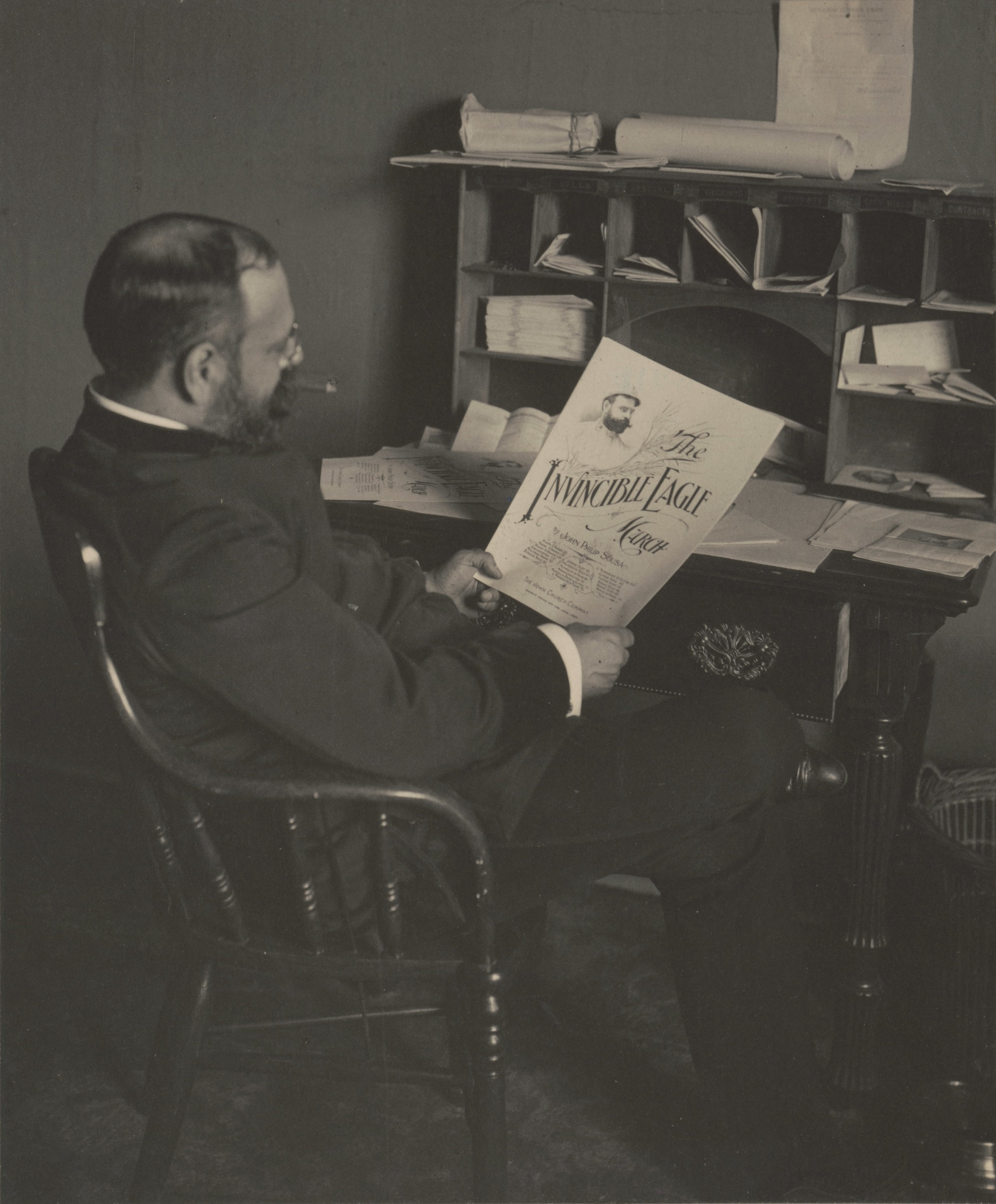
Sousa holding a copy of the sheet music for his march "The Invincible Eagle"

John Philip Sousa was an American composer and conductor known primarily for American military marches. He composed 136 marches during the late Romantic era, from 1873 until his death in 1932. (Note: The number of marches composed by Sousa was 136. He composed various other melodies found in his suites and operettas, which are sometimes mistaken for marches.) He derived a few of his marches from his other musical compositions such as melodies and operettas. "The Stars and Stripes Forever" is considered Sousa's most famous composition. A British journalist named Sousa "The March King", in comparison to "The Waltz King" — Johann Strauss II. However, not all of Sousa's marches had the same level of public appeal. Some of his early marches are lesser known and rarely performed. He composed marches for several American universities, including the universities of Minnesota, Illinois (now known as University of Illinois Urbana-Champaign), Nebraska, Kansas, Marquette, and the Pennsylvania Military College (now known as Widener University). He served as leader of the Marine Band from 1880 to 1892, and performed at the inaugural balls of President James A. Garfield and Benjamin Harrison.

In 1987, "The Stars and Stripes Forever" was made the national march of the United States, by an act of Congress. The "U.S. Field Artillery" is the official march of the United States Army. After leaving the Marine Band, he formed a civilian band and went on many tours in the subsequent 39 years. He died on March 6, 1932, at the age of 77, leaving his last march "Library of Congress" unfinished.

== List of marches ==
List of marches
Title	Year	Key (First Strain / Trio)	Time Signature (First Strain / Trio)	Form	Notes	Audio	Ref.
"Review"	1873	B♭ / E♭	6/8	I-AA-BB-Br-CC-DD-I-AA-B	"Review" was Sousa's first published march and was dedicated to Colonel William G. Moore.		
"Salutation"	1873				Composed while Sousa was a musician in the Marine Band; he dedicated it to the new band leader Louis Schneider.	—	
"The Phoenix"	1875				Dedicated to Milton Nobles. Parts of this march were later used in "Manhattan Beach".	—	
"Revival"	1876	B♭ / E♭	cut time	I-AA-BB-CC-D-I-A-B-C	Sousa composed this march at the request of his fellow composer Simon Hassle. The three strains before the Trio are repeated da capo. The Trio incorporates the hymn "In the Sweet By-and-By".		
"The Honored Dead"	1876	B♭ minor / D♭ / G♭	4/4	I-A-B-C-Br-C-Br-C-I-A-B	The occasion of this march's composition is unknown, but it was arranged upon the death of President Ulysses S. Grant in 1885, and was also used in Sousa's own funeral procession. The style is a funeral march, a dirge with a much slower tempo. The introduction and first two strains are repeated da capo.		
"Across the Danube"	1877	A♭ / D♭	6/8	I-AA-BB-C-D	Sousa credits the inspiration for this march to one of the victories of Christendom over the Turks during the Russo-Turkish War.		
"Esprit-de-corps"	1878	F minor / E♭ / A♭ / D♭	cut time	I-AA-BB-CC-DD-EE	Esprit-de-corps is a French term meaning 'the spirit of the body'. It was published one year after Sousa resigned from the Marine Corps. There are three strains before the Trio, each in a different key, and no break strains.		
"On the Tramp"	1879	A♭ / D♭	cut time	I-AA-BB-Br-C-Br-D-C	This march was based on the song "Out of Work" by Septimus Winner. The title of the march was a slang expression in the 1880s, meaning "on the lookout for employment".		
"Resumption"	1879	A♭ / D♭ / A♭	6/8	I-AA-BB-CC-DD-I-A-B	The title of this march was derived from the resumption of the use of gold and silver coins in the U.S. The introduction and first two strains are repeated da capo.		
"Globe and Eagle"	1879	E♭ / B♭ / E♭ / A♭	cut time	I-AA-BB-CC-DD-EE	This march takes its title from the emblem of the Marine Corps. It was one of several military-related titles chosen by Sousa while he was an orchestra conductor. The form unusually has three strains before the Trio, which in turn features many dramatic chromatic scales in the woodwinds.		
"Our Flirtation"	1880	E♭ / A♭	cut time	I-AA-BB-C-Br-C-Br-C	"Our Flirtation" was from a musical comedy produced in 1880. It was dedicated to Henry Litchfield West of The Washington Post.		
"Recognition March"	1880	E♭ / G♭ / E♭ / A♭	6/8 / 2/4	IAIA-BB-CC-Br-DD-EE	Sousa's heirs presented this march to the Library of Congress in 1970. It is considered a revised version of Sousa's "Salutation" march. The structure has an unusual three strains before the Trio, including a repeated introduction, and a rare second strain chromatic mediant modulation. The Trio changes from compound to simple meter, the first Sousa march to do so.		
"Guide Right"	1881	F / B♭	cut time	A-BB-CC	Sousa composed this march for use in parade, dedicating it to R. S. Collum, captain of the Marine Corps. This march omits the introduction and uses a through-composed first strain.		
"President Garfield's Inauguration"	1881	E♭ / A♭	4/4	I-AA-Br-B-Coda-CC-Br-C-I-A-Br-B-Coda	This was one of the two marches Sousa dedicated to President Garfield. It was composed for the inauguration of James A. Garfield, and was first performed on March 4, 1881. A "grand march" in style, the march is played at a slower tempo than usual, with trumpet fanfares prominent throughout. All the strains before the Trio are repeated da capo adding significantly to its length.		
"In Memoriam"	1881	B♭ minor / G♭	cut time	A-B-C-A-D-Br-D	Sousa composed this funeral march and dedicated it to President James A. Garfield, upon his death. The dirge was played by the Marine Band as the president's body was received at the Capitol in Washington, D.C., as well at Garfield's funeral in Cleveland, Ohio. It would be repeated at Sousa's own funeral half a century later.		
"Right Forward"	1881	B♭ / E♭	6/8	I-AA-BB-Br-CC-DD	This march is considered the second version of "Guide Right". It was dedicated to R. S. Collum.		
"The Wolverine"	1881	B♭ / E♭	6/8	I-AA-BB-CC-DD	Sousa composed and dedicated this march to David H. Jerome, Governor of Michigan from 1881 to 1883. It premiered in March 1881.		
"Yorktown Centennial"	1881	C / F♭	cut time	I-AA-BB-Br-C-Br-C-DD-I-A-B	Composed to commemorate the hundredth anniversary of the British surrender at Yorktown, one of the last important battles in the Revolutionary War. The introduction is one of the shortest consisting of a single chord and snare drum roll. The break strain before the trio is a snare drum solo while the break strain in the middle of the trio is a bugle call. The first half of the march is repeated da capo.		
"Congress Hall"	1882	B♭ / E♭	6/8	I-AA-BB-Br-C-Br-C	Composed after the Marine Band's first visit to the Congress Hall Inn in Cape May, New Jersey. He dedicated it to the proprietors of the inn, H. J. Crump and J. R. Crump. The second strain features a difficult Euphonium part with very fast scales across most of the range of the instrument.		
"Bonnie Annie Laurie"	1883	B♭ / E♭	cut time	I-AA-BB-CC-D-I-A-B	Inspired by the old Scottish ballad "Annie Laurie", which he considered the most beautiful of all folk songs.		
"Mother Goose"	1883	F / B♭	6/8 / 2/4	I-AA-BB-Br-C-DD-E-C	This march quotes several nursery rhyme songs, including: "Come All Ye Young Maids", "I'se Come to See Miss Jennie Jones" (a variant on the more well-known "Here We Go Round the Mulberry Bush"), "Little Jack Horner", "There Is a Man in Our Town" (a variant on the much more well-known "Bingo", "Oh, Dear Doctor", and "Down in the Meadow".		
"Pet of the Petticoats"	1883	F / B♭	2/4	A-B-Br-B-A	The occasion and reason for this march's composition are unknown. The usual introduction, first strain, and second strain are all through-composed as one section, which is repeated da capo after the Trio.		
"Right-Left"	1883	F / B♭	6/8	I-AA-B-A-C-Br-C	The trio famously features shouts of "Right! Left!" at regular intervals, probably depicting the drills of the Marine Corps.		
"Transit of Venus"	1883	D♭ / G♭ / G / G♭	6/8	I-AA-BB-C-D-C	Composed for the unveiling of a statue of Joseph Henry, the first secretary of the Smithsonian Institution, and was premiered in April 1883. The unusual two-strain Trio structure has a rare half-step modulation in the middle section.		
"The White Plume"	1884	B♭ / E♭	2/4	AA-BB-C-D-A-B	Sousa composed this march by transforming a previous piece of which he composed with Edward M. Taber. He rearranged the piece and added new sections. This is one of the few marches without an introduction, and repeats the first two strains da capo.		
"The Mikado"	1885	D♭ / A♭ / D♭ / G♭	/ 6/8 /	I-A-B-C-D	This march was based on themes from the Gilbert and Sullivan comic opera of the same name.		
"Mother Hubbard"	1885	E♭ / A♭	6/8 / 2/4	I-AA-BB-Br-CC-DD-Br-D-C	This march is considered a version of "Mother Goose" as it is also based on a nursery rhyme theme. Several nursery rhyme songs are quoted: "Three Blind Mice", "Thus the Farmer Sows His Seed", "Old Mother Hubbard", "Hey Diddle Diddle", "Little Redbird in the Tree", "London Bridge Is Falling Down", and "The Minstrel Boy". The second strain features a unique woodwind soli.		
"Sound Off"	1885	C minor / E♭ / A♭	cut time	I-AA-B-CC-Br-C-Br-C	Sousa composed this march and dedicated it to Major George Porter Houston. The title of the march is a military command. The first strain repeat features a prominent euphonium countermelody. The second strain is through-composed rather than the usual repeat.		
"Triumph of Time"	1885	F / B♭	6/8	I-AA-BB-Br-CC-D	The occasion and reason for this march's composition are unknown. The second strain and Trio notably features very fast scales and arpeggios in the woodwinds.		
"The Gladiator"	1886	C minor / E♭ / A♭	cut time	I-AA-BB-CC-Br-C-Br-C	The inspiration for this march is not confirmed, but it is widely believed that Sousa might have been inspired by a literary account of some particular gladiator. It was initially composed for a music publisher in Pennsylvania, but after they rejected the march, it was sold to Harry Coleman, who sold over a million copies of it.		
"The Rifle Regiment"	1886	D♭ / G♭	cut time	I-A-I-A-BB-C-Br-C	The occasion for the composition of this march is unknown, but it was dedicated to the officers of the 3rd U.S. Infantry. The introduction is an unusually long 20 bars and repeated with the first strain. The trio is also quite long at 32 bars, so it is not repeated.		
"The Occidental"	1887	E♭ / A♭	cut time	I-AA-BB-CC-Br-C-Br-C	The occasion of this march's composition is unknown, but it was published four years after being composed.		
"Ben Bolt"	1888	E♭ / E♭ minor / B♭ / E♭ / A♭	2/4	I-AA-BB-C-D-E	This march quotes several songs of the day in each strain, respectively: "The Daisy Polka" by Luigi Arditi, the African American spiritual "Go Down Moses", "Sally in Our Alley" by Henry Carey, "Ben Bolt" by Nelson Kneass, and . "O Fair Dove, O Fond Dove" by Alfred Scott Gatty.		
"The Crusader"	1888	D♭ / G♭	cut time	I-AA-Br-B-Br-B-CC-Br-C-Br-C	Sousa composed this march after being "knighted" by Columbia Commandery No. 2, a local division of the Knights Templar of the Masonic York Rite. It is believed that Sousa used fragments of Masonic music in the march. This march features a rare break strain between the first two strains.		
"National Fencibles"	1888	B♭ / E♭	cut time	I-AA-BB-CC-Br-C-Br-C	The titular National Fencibles were a Washington, D.C.-based drill team. The break strain features suspended cymbal and a snare drum solo.		
"Semper Fidelis"	1888	C / F	6/8	I-AA-BB-Br-CCC-DD	During a conversation with Sousa, President Chester A. Arthur expressed his displeasure for "Hail to the Chief", the personal anthem of the president, and requested that Sousa compose a more appropriate piece. "Semper Fidelis" was composed two years after Arthur's death, which takes its title from the motto of the U.S. Marine Corps, which means "always faithful". The march unusually features a drum break before the trio. The first Trio strain is constructed of a bugle call repeated three times with increasingly complex accompaniment superimposed on it. Famously, there is no stinger.		
"The Picador"	1889	G minor / B♭ / E♭	cut time	I-AA-BB-CC-Br-C-Br-C	Composed in 1889, and was soon sold to publisher Harry Coleman, for $35 (equivalent to $1,300 in 2025). A bullfight was depicted on the front page of its sheet music.		
"The Quilting Party March"	1889	A♭ / D♭	2/4	I-AA-BB-Br-CC	Sousa quoted two songs to construct this march. The first strain quotes "When a Wooer Goes a-Wooing" from Gilbert and Sullivan's The Yeomen of the Guard. The trio quotes "Seeing Nellie Home", also known as "Aunt Dinah's Quilting Party" by Patrick S. Gilmore. The march is quite brief with only a short interlude between the second and trio strains.		
"The Thunderer"	1889	F / B♭	cut time	I-AA-BB-CC-Br-C-Br-C	Composed for the occasion of the 24th triennial Conclave of the Grand Encampment of the Knights Templar, and was dedicated to Columbia Commandery No. 2.		
"The Washington Post"	1889	F / B♭	6/8	I-AA-BB-CC-Br-C-Br-C	Composed for the award ceremony of an essay contest organized by The Washington Post. With President Benjamin Harrison in attendance, the march was premiered in June 1889.		
"Corcoran Cadets"	1890	A♭ / D♭	cut time	I-AA-BB-C-Br-C-Br-C	Composed at the request of a California-based drill team named "Corcoran Cadets".		
"The High School Cadets"	1890	D♭ / G♭	cut time	I-AA-BB-CC-DD	Composed at the request of the students of the only high school in Washington, D.C. (later called Central High School). He was requested to compose a march superior to his "National Fencibles" march, which he had written for a rival cadet corps. It was published in February 1890. The double Trio has no break strain and, notably, no stinger at the end.		
"The Loyal Legion"	1890	G minor / B♭ / E♭	cut time	I-AA-BB-CC-Br-C-Br-C	Composed to commemorate the twenty-fifth anniversary of the founding of the Loyal Legion. It was first played in April 1890.		
"Homeward Bound"	1891/92	E♭ / A♭	2/4	I-AA-BB-C-Br-C-Br-C	Originally unpublished and rediscovered in 1965, 23 years after Sousa's death. It is believed to have been composed in 1891 or 1892 and was hinted at in Sousa's autobiography Marching Along.		
"The Belle of Chicago"	1892	E♭ / A♭	cut time	I-AA-BB-CC-DD	Composed to salute the ladies of Chicago, an action for which he was criticized. The march is more popular overseas than in the United States.		
"March of the Royal Trumpets" <---------	1892	E♭ / A♭	cut time	I-AA-BB-C-Br-C-Br-C	A rare case of a "grand march" at a slower tempo and in a European style. This march was never published in its original form. Egyptian trumpets were used in its composition.		
"On Parade"	1892	D♭ / G♭ / D♭	cut time	I-AA-BB-CC-DD-I-A-B	This march was published after being orchestrated into two different Sousa compositions. It was also known as "The Lion Tamer". The fanfare introduction and first two strains are repeated after the double Trio.		
"The Triton"	1892	B♭ / E♭	6/8	I-A-B-A-CC-DD-I-A-B-A	Originally composed by a composer named J. Molloy, this march was formed by transforming Molloy's simple arrangement into a march. The form is an unusual binary form with the entire first section repeated after the double strain Trio.		
"The Beau Ideal"	1893	D♭ / G♭	cut time	I-AA-BB-CC-Br-C-Br-C	An inscription on the original sheet music indicated that "Beau Ideal" was a newly formed organization called The National League of Musicians of the United States.		
"The Liberty Bell"	1893	F / B♭	6/8	I-AA-BB-C-Br-C-Br-C	Sousa initially composed this march as an operetta at the request of Francis Wilson, but he later transformed it into a march. The unveiling of a painting of the Liberty Bell in Chicago and his son's march in a Philadelphia parade in the bell's honor inspired Sousa to name the march "The Liberty Bell". The Trio features a prominent part for chimes and large bell. The march is famously known as the theme to Monty Python's Flying Circus.		
"Manhattan Beach"	1893	F / B♭	cut time	I-AA-BB-CC-DD	This march had been derived from an earlier composition, probably "The Phoenix March". It was dedicated to Austin Corbin. The Trio's smooth harmonies and clarinet arpeggios are said to depict the waves of the beach. In a very unusual effect, the final trio strain ends quietly with no stinger.		
"The Directorate"	1894	F / B♭	cut time	I-AA-BB-CC-DD	Sousa composed this march in appreciation of an honor bestowed upon Sousa by the Board of Directors of the 1893 St. Louis Exposition. The Trio unusually has no break strain, but instead two strains each repeated.		
"King Cotton"	1895	E♭ / A♭	6/8	I-AA-BB-CC-Br-C-Br-C	Composed for the Cotton States and International Exposition of 1895. It was named the official march of the exposition.		
"El Capitan"	1896	B♭ / E♭	6/8 / 2/4	I-AA-BB-CC-Br-DD	This march was extracted from Sousa's operetta, El Capitan. It was played at Admiral Dewey's victory parade in New York in 1899. The Trio changes from compound to simple meter. The first trio strain is extended functioning as a brief break strain leading to the second trio strain.		
"The Stars and Stripes Forever"	1896	E♭ / A♭	cut time	I-AA-BB-C-Br-C-Br-C	"The Stars and Stripes Forever" is Sousa's most famous composition. He composed the march at sea on Christmas Day in 1896 and committed the notes to paper on his arrival in the United States. It was first performed at Willow Grove Park, just outside Philadelphia, on May 14, 1897, and was immediately greeted with enthusiasm. In 1987, it was made the national march of the United States by an act of Congress. The Trio features a famous piccolo solo.		
"The Bride Elect"	1897	D♭ / G♭	6/8 / 2/4	I-AA-BB-CC-Br-DD	This march was extracted from an operetta named The Bride Elect. Frank Simon, a cornetist in Sousa's band, said that it was one of Sousa's favorite marches. The trio changes from compound to simple meter, and has two strains.		
"The Charlatan"	1898	E♭ / A♭	6/8	I-A-BB-CC-Br-C-Br-C	This march is extracted from Acts II and III of Sousa's operetta of the same name. The first strain is through-composed rather than repeated.		
"Hands Across the Sea"	1899	F / B♭	cut time	I-AA-BB-CC-Br-C-Br-C	It is believed that Sousa took inspiration for this march from an incident in the Spanish–American War. He did not address it to any particular nation, but to all of America's friends abroad. It was first played at the Philadelphia Academy of Music in April 1899.		
"The Man Behind the Gun"	1900	A♭ / D♭	6/8 / 2/4	I-AA-BB-CC-(Br)-DD	Sousa considered this march an echo of the Spanish–American War, and it first appeared in an operetta in 1899. The Trio changes meter from compound to simple meter, a rare device in Sousa's marches. A brief extension of the first trio strain functions as a break strain before the second trio strain.		
"Hail to the Spirit of Liberty"	1900	E♭ / A♭	cut time	I-AA-BB-C-Br-C-Br-C	Composed for Sousa's band's first overseas tour of Paris. It was first played when Lafayette's monument was unveiled there on July 4, 1900.		
"The Invincible Eagle"	1901	F / B♭	6/8	I-AA-BB-C-Br-C-Br-C	This march was dedicated to the Pan-American Exposition, held in Buffalo in 1901.		
"The Pride of Pittsburgh"	1901	F / B♭ / F	4/4	I-A-Br-B-Br-C-I-A-Br-A/B/C-Coda	Composed for the dedication of the Music Hall at the Western Pennsylvania Exposition. The title of the march was selected through a contest arranged by Pittsburgh newspapers. The style is a "grand march" in a slower tempo than usual, with a more through-composed form. Percussion is limited, but includes a Timpani part. References to songs by two Pittsburgh composers are included: Stephen Foster's "Come Where My Love Lies Dreaming" and Ethelbert Nevin's "Narcissus". The final strain cleverly takes all the melodies from each respective strain and superimposes them for a grand finale.		
"Imperial Edward"	1902	B♭ / E♭	cut time	I-AA-BB-CC-Br-DD	Composed this march for and dedicated to Edward VII. The trio contains a fragment of "God Save the King".		
"Jack Tar"	1903	A♭ / D♭	6/8 / 2/4 / 6/8	I-A-B-A-C-Br-C	Originally titled "British Tar", this march was premiered at Royal Albert Hall in 1903. The march has an unusual structure, with the first strain reprising after the second. The break strain switches to simple meter with a quote of "The Sailor's Hornpipe", a traditional melody associated with the British Royal Navy. Appropriately, it features a boatswain's whistle and ship's bell in the percussion.		
"The Diplomat"	1904	F / B♭	6/8	I-AA-BB-C-Br-C-Br-C	After being impressed by the diplomatic skills of Secretary of State John Hay, Sousa composed this march and dedicated it to him.		
"The Free Lance"	1906	B♭ / E♭	6/8 / 2/4	I-AA-Br-BB-CC-D-Br-D-Br-D	This march used tunes extracted from Sousa's operetta of the same name. The trio of the march is based on "On to Victory" from the operetta. The form is unusually long with more strains than typical. Unique among Sousa's marches is the break strain between the first and second strains. The double Trio changes time signatures from compound to simple meter.		
"Powhatan's Daughter"	1907	C minor / E♭ / A♭	cut time	I-A-BB-C-Br-C-Br-C	Composed for the 1907 Jamestown Exposition, and was a salute to Chief Powhatan's daughter Pocahontas. The first strain is through-composed and begins in a minor key. By the second strain, the key modulates to the relative major.		
"The Fairest of the Fair"	1908	E♭ / A♭	2/4	* I-A-BB-C-Br-C-Br-C	On being invited with his band to play at the Boston food fair, Sousa composed this march for the fair. It was first played in September 1908. The first strain is through-composed instead of a repeat. Both the first and second strain end with a brief passage based on the introduction material.		
"The Glory of the Yankee Navy"	1909	F / B♭	2/4	I-AA-BB-C-Br-C-Br-C	The march was composed for the musical comedy "The Yankee Girl"; Sousa dedicated it to Blanche Ring, the star of the show.		
"The Federal"	1910	D♭ / G♭	cut time	I-AA-BB-C-Br-C-Br-C	Sousa composed this march just before embarking on his world tour, honoring the people of Australia and New Zealand. It was originally titled "The Land of the Golden Fleece", but that was changed to "The Federal" at the request of George Reid, the high commissioner for Australia.		
"From Maine to Oregon"	1913	E♭ / A♭ / C minor / E♭	2/4	I-A-B-C-Br-C	Sousa's operetta "All American" had been transformed to compose this march. The unusually difficult upper woodwind parts contain many florid 16th note runs. A ratchet features in the break strain, which changes the key for the final repetition to the home key.		
"Columbia's Pride"	1914	D♭ / G♭	6/8	I-A-BB	Based on a Sousa's 1890 song "Nail the flag to the mast". Sousa made some modifications in the song and composed this march for piano, which he apparently never arranged on a band or orchestra. The first strain is through-composed without repeats, the typical contrasting second strain, nor any break strain in the Trio. This is one of Sousa's shortest marches.		
"The Lambs' March"	1914	E♭ / A♭	cut time	I-AA-BB-C-D-C/D	Composed and dedicated to The Lambs Club of New York. Fragments of this march were later transformed into Sousa's 1882 operetta "The Smugglers". The Trio features two different melodies in turn followed by both superimposed, with no break strain.		
"The New York Hippodrome"	1915	B♭ / F / B♭ / E♭	6/8	I-A-BB-A-C-Br-C-Br-C	Composed in commemoration of Sousa's band's tour as his band was featured in extravaganza at the New York Hippodrome. The first strain is through-composed instead of the usual repeat. The second strain unusually changes key, followed by a first strain repeat.		
"March of the Pan Americans" ??????	1915	E♭ / A♭	cut time	I-AA-BB-C-Br-C-Br-C	"March of the Pan-Americans" is Sousa's longest march, lasting approximately fifteen minutes. The march incorporated national anthems of various nations.	—	
"The Pathfinder of Panama"	1915	B♭ / E♭	cut time	I-AA-BB-C-Br-C-Br-C	Composed at the request of Walter Anthony, a San Francisco Call's reporter. It was dedicated to Panama Canal and Panama Pacific exposition held in 1915.		
"America First"	1916	B♭ / E♭	cut time	I-AA-BB-CC-D-C	Inspired by President Woodrow Wilson's 1915 speech at the twenty-fifth anniversary convention of the Daughters of the American Revolution in 1915. It premiered on February 22, 1916 (George Washington's birthday). The march contains quotations from popular songs of the time: "We're Off to Philadelphia in the Morning" as a woodwind countermelody in the first strain, "Maryland, My Maryland" as a trumpet and trombone countermelody in the second strain, "Yankee Doodle" as a woodwind countermelody in second trio repetition, and "Dixie" as a tuba solo in the third Trio strain.		
"Boy Scouts of America"	1916	C / F	6/8	I-AB-Br-AB-C-Br-C-Br-C	Composed at the request of Charles D. Hart, President of the Philadelphia Council of the Boy Scouts and dedicated to the Boy Scouts of America. The first section is a longer amalgamation of two melodic ideas rather than distinct strains, with a brief "break strain" of a whistling tune.		
"Liberty Loan"	1917	E♭ / A♭	6/8	I-AA-BB-C-Br-C	Composed for Fourth Liberty Loan campaign of World War I, at the joint request of Secretary of the Treasury William Gibbs McAdoo and Liberty Loan Director Charles Schweppe. The Trio and break strain prominently features a Chimes solo.		
"The Naval Reserve"	1917	C / F	cut time	I-AA-BB-C-D-E	Dedicated to officers of the Naval Reserve. Other titles for this march were "Boys in the Navy Blue" and "Great Lakes". The Trio opens with a bugle call strain, then is an adaption of Sousa's own song "Blue Ridge, I'm Coming Back to You."		
"U.S. Field Artillery March"	1917	A♭ / D♭	2/4	I-A-BB-C-Br-C	Composed at the request of Army Lieutenant George Friedlander of the 306th Field Artillery. The first strain is through-composed rather than a repetition. The Trio prominently features "The Caisson Song", the official march of the U.S. Army.		
"The White Rose"	1917	B♭ minor / D♭ / G♭	2/4	I-A-BB-C-Br-C-Br-C	Composerd at the request of Pennsylvania civic committee. It was played at a public concert by combined bands in 1917.		
"Wisconsin Forward Forever"	1917	A♭ / D♭	cut time	I-AA-BB-C-Br-C-Br-C	The occasion and purpose of "Wisconsin Forward Forever" is unknown, although it is speculated that Sousa composed it to salute Wisconsin's contribution to war efforts. It was originally titled "Solid men to front", but that title was crossed out on the march's music manuscript, with the present title written.		
"Anchor and Star"	1918	C / F	6/8	I-AA-BB-Br-CC-C'C'-DD	Sousa composed "Anchor and Star" while leading the Navy Battalion Band during World War I. He dedicated it to the U.S. Navy and it was named after the U.S. Navy's emblem. The Trio features a bugle call which is then superimposed with another melody. Instead of a break strain, there's a second Trio strain.		
"Bullets and Bayonets"	1918	E♭ / A♭	cut time	I-AA-BB-C-Br-C-Br-C	Composed during World War I, "Bullets and Bayonets" was dedicated to the officers and men of the U.S. infantry.		
"The Chantyman's March"	1918	F / C / F / Bb	6/8 / 2/4	A-BB-CC-DD-EE-FF-GHH-J-GH	After enlisting in the U.S. Navy in 1917, Sousa made a study of sea chanteys and then wrote an article for The Great Lakes Recruit entitled "Songs of the Sea." He made further use of the study while on a brief leave from the navy the following spring by composing one of his medley-type marches and calling it The Chantyman's March. The march incorporates eight chanteys, in this order: "Knock a Man Down", "Away for Rio", "Haul the Bowline", "The Ballad of Billy Taylor", "It's Time for Us to Leave Her", "Put up Clearing Gear", "Hoodah Day" (more commonly known as "Camptown Races") and "A-Roving."		
"Flags of Freedom"	1918	B♭ / E♭	2/4	I-A-BCC-Br-I-D-E-F-G-H	Composed at the request of Joseph Gannon, chairman of Fourth liberty loan drive in World War I. Belgium, Italy, France (La Marseillaise), Great Britain (God Save the King), and the United States (Columbia, Gem of the Ocean) are represented in this march, each nation in turn receiving a strain, leading to the unusual form of the march. (Note: Five of the 21 countries that were at war with Germany.)		
"Sabre and Spurs"	1918	F / B♭	6/8	I-AA-BB-C-C/D-C/D-EE	Dedicated to officers of 311th Cavalry and was also known as "March of the American Cavalry". The Trio features the novelty of horses hooves, usually played on a wood block. The regimental trumpets play a prominent bugle call, which is superimposed with a second trio melody. Without a break strain, the final trio strain features xylophone.		
"Solid Men to the Front"	1918	E♭ / A♭	cut time	I-AA-BB-C-Br-C-Br-C	Composed during World War I. The title was initially used in music sheet of "Wisconsin Forward" march, but was later used for this march. The double-length second strain features an unusually difficult euphonium countermelody.		
"USAAC"	1918	B♭ / E♭	2/4	I-A-B-C-D-Br-D-Br-D	Composed for members of the United States Army Ambulance Corps. It contains melodies from a musical composition called "Good-Bye Bill". The first strains are unusually through-composed and not repeated. The Trio unusually includes the xylophone.		
"The Volunteers"	1918	E♭ / A♭	6/8	I-AA-BB-C-Br-C	Composed at the request of Robert D. Heinl, chief of the Defense Department of Patriotic services. It premiered in March 1918. The percussion section features such novelties as a siren, wood block, anvils, and a cymbal mimicking a riveting machine.		
"Wedding March"	1918	B♭ / G♭ / B♭ / E♭ / B♭ / G♭ / B♭ /	4/4	I-A-Br-B-Tr-A-C-Br2-Tr2-C-A-Br-Tr-C'	Composed at the request of Representatives of American Relief Legion during World War I. The style is much more stately than usual, with an extra break strain between the first and second strains, unusually in a distant key. Several "transition" sections lengthen this march considerably. The first strains are repeated, followed by a grandioso Trio strain in the original key, featuring chimes.		
"The Victory Chest" ?????	1918	E♭ / A♭ ?????	?????	I-AA-BB-C-Br-C-Br-C ?????	"The Victory Chest" was composed in May 1918. The occasion and reason for composition of this march are unknown.	—	
"The Golden Star"	1919	B♭ minor / F♭ / B♭ minor / G♭ / B♭ minor	4/4	A-B-C-A-D-Br-D-A	Composed in memory of Theodore Roosevelt's son Quentin, who was killed in France. The dirge style and form are very unusual for Sousa, including one of his few composed Timpani parts. The third strain features the trumpets playing Taps, the traditional bugle call at a military funeral.		
"Comrades of the Legion"	1920	E♭ / A♭	cut time	I-AA-BB-C-Br-C-Br-C	Composed shortly after World War I for the newly formed American Legion. It was titled "Comrades of the Legion", but it was changed to "The American Legion March". However, original title was used in the published version.		
"On the Campus"	1920	A♭ / D♭	cut time	I-AA-BB-CC-Br-C-Br-C	Composed at the request of the publisher and dedicated it to "collegians, past, present, and future".		
"Who's Who In Navy Blue"	1920	B♭ / E♭	2/4	I-AA-BB-C-Br-C-Br-C	Composed at the request of a student body from the U.S. Naval Academy. T. R. Wirth suggested the title "Ex Scientia Tridens", but Sousa rejected it and named it "Who's Who in Navy Blue".		
"Keeping in Step With the Union"	1921	E♭ / A♭	6/8	I-AA-BB-CC-Br-C-Br-C	Inspired by an 1855 speech by Congressman Rufus Choate. The march is dedicated to First Lady Florence Harding.		
"The Gallant Seventh"	1923	F / B♭	cut time	I-AA-BB-C-Br1-C-Br2-C-Br2-C	This march's title had been taken from a regiment on New York National Guard, composed at the request of Colonel Wade H. Hayes. The march unusually features two break strains: the first features a fanfare for trumpets and drums which is superimposed on the second and fourth trio repeats, while the second is more typical.		
"The Dauntless Battalion"	1922	F / B♭	cut time	I-AA-BB-CC-Br-C-Br-C	Upon receiving honorary doctorate from the Pennsylvania Military College in Chester, Sousa composed "The Dauntless Battalion" to honor the cadets. It was originally titled "Pennsylvania Military College March", but upon its publication, the title was changed to "The Dauntless Battalion". The Trio unusually features a Xylophone.		
"March of the Mitten Men"	1923	A♭ / D♭	cut time	I-AA-BB-C-D-C/D	Composed and dedicated to Thomas E. Mitten. For its second edition, the title was changed to "Power and Glory". The unusual Trio starts with a much longer strain than usual. Another strain follows with a quotation of Arthur Sullivan's hymn "Onward, Christian Soldiers". Finally both strains are superimposed with the hymn tune in the Trombones and Euphonium. The hymn's refrain concludes the march.		
"Nobles of the Mystic Shrine"	1923	B♭ minor / D♭ / G♭	cut time	I-AA-BB-C-Br-C-Br-C	Composed on request of Sousa's nephew, and was dedicated to the Almas Temple and Imperial Council. Several unusual percussion instruments are included, such as tambourine, Turkish Crescent, and a harp.		
"Ancient and Honorable Artillery Company"	1924	C / F	cut time	I-AA-BB-C-Br-CC'	Sousa composed "Ancient and Honorable Artillery Company" at the request of the Ancient and Honorable Artillery Company. It was formally presented to the company at Symphony Hall in Boston, Massachusetts, in September, 1924. The Trio quotes the Scottish folk song "Auld Lang Syne."		
"The Black Horse Troop"	1924	F / B♭	6/8	I-AA-B-"Br"-B-C-Br-C-Br-C	Dedicated to the mounted troops of a Cleveland National Guard Unit. Sousa's admiration of black horses used in Guard Unit is reflected in the title of the march. The second strain has an unusual "quasi-break" strain between the two repeats. The Trio strain is also longer than usual with an intermediate melody between the two halves of the primary melody. For novel effect, the percussion includes a part for "horses hoves", usually played on Temple Blocks.		
"Marquette University March"	1924	B♭ / E♭	cut time	I-AA-BB-CC-Br-C-Br-C	Composed in appreciation for Marquette University, when Sousa received n honorary doctorate.		
"The National Game"	1925	B♭ / E♭	6/8	I-AA-BB-C-Br-C-Br-C	Composed on request of Kenesaw Landis, baseball's high commissioner, on occasion of National League's fiftieth anniversary. The break strain uses a wood block to imitate the crack of a baseball bat.		
"The Gridiron Club"	1925–26	D♭ / G♭	cut time	I-AA-BB-C-Br-C-Br-C	Another version of this march composed for piano is also called "Universal Peace", which was discovered among Sousa's papers in 1965. Other titles for "The Gridiron Club" are "The Wildcat" and "The Untitled March". The break strain features the unusual percussion of suspended cymbal and wood block.	—	
"The Universal Peace"	1925–26	E♭ / A♭ ???	???	I-AA-BB-C-Br-C-Br-C ???	The occasion and reason for the composition of this march are unknown. The manuscript of this march was found with Sousa's documents in 1965.	—	
"Old Ironsides"	1926	C minor / E♭ / A♭	cut time	I-AA-BB-C-Br-C-Br-C	Composed for a rally held in Madison Square Garden, regarding deterioration of historic old Ironsides. The march was never published.		
"The Pride Of The Wolverines"	1926	F / B♭	cut time	I-AA-BB-C-Br-C-Br-C	Composed at the request of Detroit's mayor John W. Smith. It was later declared official march of Detroit.	—	
"Sesquicentennial Exposition March"	1926	B♭ / E♭	6/8	I-AA-BB-C-Br-C-Br-C	Composed on request of Sesquicentennial Exposition officials, for the 150th anniversary of American independence. The Trio and break strain unusually feature triangle and chimes.	—	
"The Atlantic City Pageant"	1927	D♭ / G♭	cut time	I-AA-BB-C-Br-C-Br-C	Sousa wrote "The Atlantic City Pageant" on suggestion of Atlantic City's mayor Anthony M. Ruffu. It was played to celebrate the second annual engagement of Sousa's band in Atlantic City.	—	
"Magna Carta"	1927	C / F	cut time	I-AA-BB-C-Br-C-Br-C	Sousa composed "Magna Carta" on request of the International Magna Carta Day Association.	—	
"The Minnesota March"	1927	E♭ / A♭	6/8	I-AA-BB-C-Br-C-Br-C	"The Minnesota March" was composed at the request of the University of Minnesota football team. Sousa used Indian themes in this march, and later added field drum and bugle parts.		
"Riders for the Flag"	1927	C / F	6/8	I-AA-BB-C-Br-C-Br-C	"Riders for the Flag" was composed at the request of Colonel Osmun Latrobe, and was dedicated to him.	—	
"Golden Jubilee"	1928	F / B♭	cut time	I-AA-BB-C-Br-C-Br-C	Sousa composed "Golden Jubilee" to commemorate his fiftieth year as a conductor. Initially he was hesitant to compose anything for his own gratification, but reasoned that his public might expect something.	—	
"New Mexico"	1928	C / F	cut time	I-AA-BB-C-Br-C-Br-C	"New Mexico" march was composed at the request of J. F. Zimmerman, President of the University of New Mexico. It was original titled "The Queen of the Plateau".	—	
"Prince Charming"	1928	B♭ / E♭	cut time	I-AA-BB-C-Br-C-Br-C	Student band from the Elementary school in Los Angeles inspired Sousa to compose "Prince Charming". It was dedicated to the band's organizer Jennie L. Jones.	—	
"University of Nebraska"	1928	C / F	6/8	I-AA-BB-C-Br-C-Br-C	Sousa composed this march for the University of Nebraska at its Director's request. He initially considered naming the march "The Corn-huskers", but ended up naming it "University of Nebraska", dedicating it to the faculty and students of the university.	—	
"University of Illinois"	1929	C / F	cut time	I-AA-BB-C-Br-C-Br-C	Sousa composed this march for University of Illinois, as he considered its band the finest among all colleges. It premiered in July 1929.	—	
"La Flor De Sevilla"	1929	F / B♭	cut time	I-AA-BB-C-Br-C-Br-C	"La Flor De Sevilla" was inspired from an old Spanish proverb "Quien no ha visto Sevilla no ha visto maravilla" meaning "He, who has not seen Sevilla has not seen beauty". The march was composed at the request of the directors of the Ibero-American Exposition held at Seville, Spain.	—	
"Daughters of Texas"	1929	F / B♭	6/8	I-AA-BB-C-Br-C-Br-C	"Daughters of Texas" was composed upon submission of a petition signed by 1,300 students of Texas college. Two different sets of marches were composed, but one march from the set has been lost.	—	
"Foshay Tower Washington Memorial"	1929	F / B♭	6/8	I-AA-BB-C-Br-C-Br-C	"Foshay Tower Washington Memorial" was composed from parts of "Daughters of Texas", another of Sousa's marches. It was re-premiered in August 1976, when Sousa's name was added to the Hall of Fame for Great Americans.	—	
"The Royal Welch Fusiliers"	1929	B♭ / E♭	cut time	I-AA-BB-C-Br-C-Br-C	"The Royal Welch Fusiliers" were two marches composed to commemorate the association of U.S. Marines with Battalion of Royal Welch in Britain. These were the only marches written by Sousa for a British Army regiment. The two versions have the same title, and are referred as numbers 1 and 2.		
"The Royal Welch Fusiliers"	1930				"The Royal Welch Fusiliers" were two marches composed to commemorate the association of U.S. Marines with Battalion of Royal Welch in Britain. These were the only marches written by Sousa for a British Army regiment. The two versions have the same title, and are referred as numbers 1 and 2.		
"George Washington Bicentennial March"	1930	B♭ / E♭	cut time	I-AA-BB-C-Br-C-Br-C	Sousa was requested to compose a march to commemorate two hundredth anniversary of George Washington. Sousa participated and arranged "George Washington Bicentennial March" in the final ceremony, conducting combined bands of Navy, Army and Marine Corps.	—	
"Harmonica Wizard"	1930	C / F	6/8	I-AA-BB-C-Br-C-Br-C	Sousa had composed "Harmonica Wizard" when he was leading the "hoxie's boys" harmonica band. It was first performed in November 1930.	—	
"The Legionnaires"	1930	B♭ / E♭	cut time	I-AA-BB-C-Br-C-Br-C	"The Legionnaires" was composed on request of the French government for the 1931 International Colonial and Overseas Exposition in Paris.	—	
"The Salvation Army"	1930	B♭ minor / B♭ / E♭ / B♭ / E♭	cut time	I-AA-BB-C-Br-C-Br-C	"The Salvation Army" was composed on request of Commander Evangeline Booth of the Salvation Army. It premiered in New York on fiftieth anniversary of Salvation Army.	—	
"The Wildcats"	1930/31	E♭ / A♭ ????	????	I-AA-BB-C-Br-C-Br-C	Parts of "The Wildcats" was composed in early 1926. It was originally composed for Kansas State College, but the college was provided with a completely different march.	—	
"The Aviators"	1931	D minor / B♭	cut time	I-AA-BB-C-Br-C-Br-C	Sousa dedicated "The Aviators" to one of his close friends and Chief of Navy's bureau of Aeronautics, William A. Moffett.	—	
"A Century of Progress"	1931	C / F	cut time	I-AA-BB-C-Br-C-Br-C	Sousa was requested to compose a march on the hundredth anniversary of Chicago's incorporation as a town in 1933. He composed "A Century of Progress", but died a few months before the anniversary.	—	
"The Northern Pines"	1931	E♭ / A♭	6/8	I-AA-BB-C-Br-C-Br-C	Inspired by the band at Interlochen, Sousa composed "The Northern Pines" immediately prior to his second visit at the National Music Camp in Interlochen	—	
"Kansas Wildcats"	1931	B♭ / E♭	cut time	I-AA-BB-C-Br-C-Br-C	Sousa was requested to compose a march for Kansas State College. "Kansas Wildcats" was subsequently dedicated to the college.	—	
"The Circumnavigators Club"	1931	F / B♭	cut time	I-AA-BB-C-Br-C-Br-C	"The Circumnavigators Club" was composed and played for the Circumnavigators Club in December 1931. This was Sousa's last completed composition.	—	
"Library of Congress" (unfinished)	1932	E♭ / A♭	cut time	I-AA-BB-C-Br-C-Br-C	"Library of Congress " was Sousa's last march, which he began composing in 1931. He died leaving the march unfinished. It was later finished by Stephen Bulla.	—	

Gallery
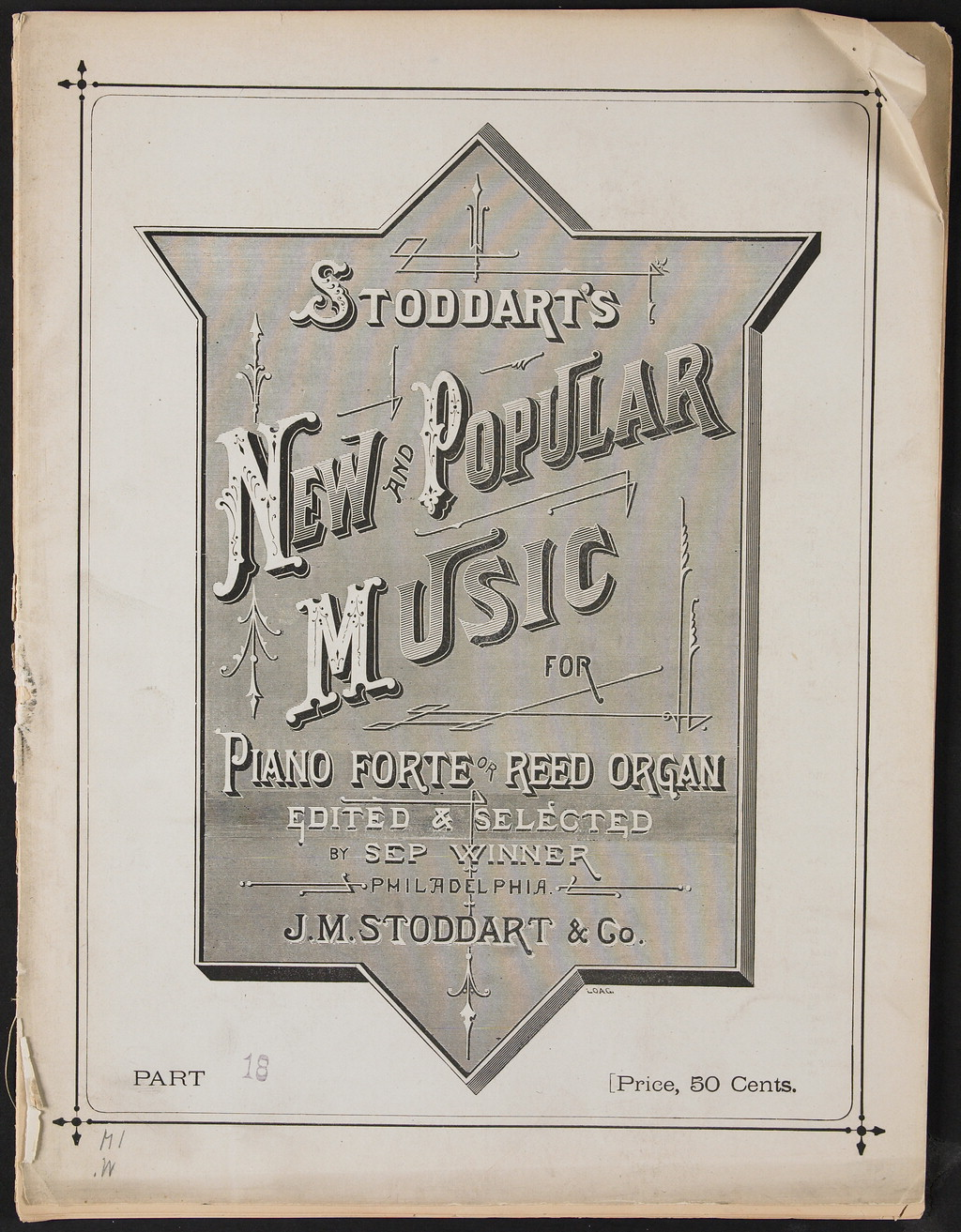
Music sheet of march "Across the Danube"

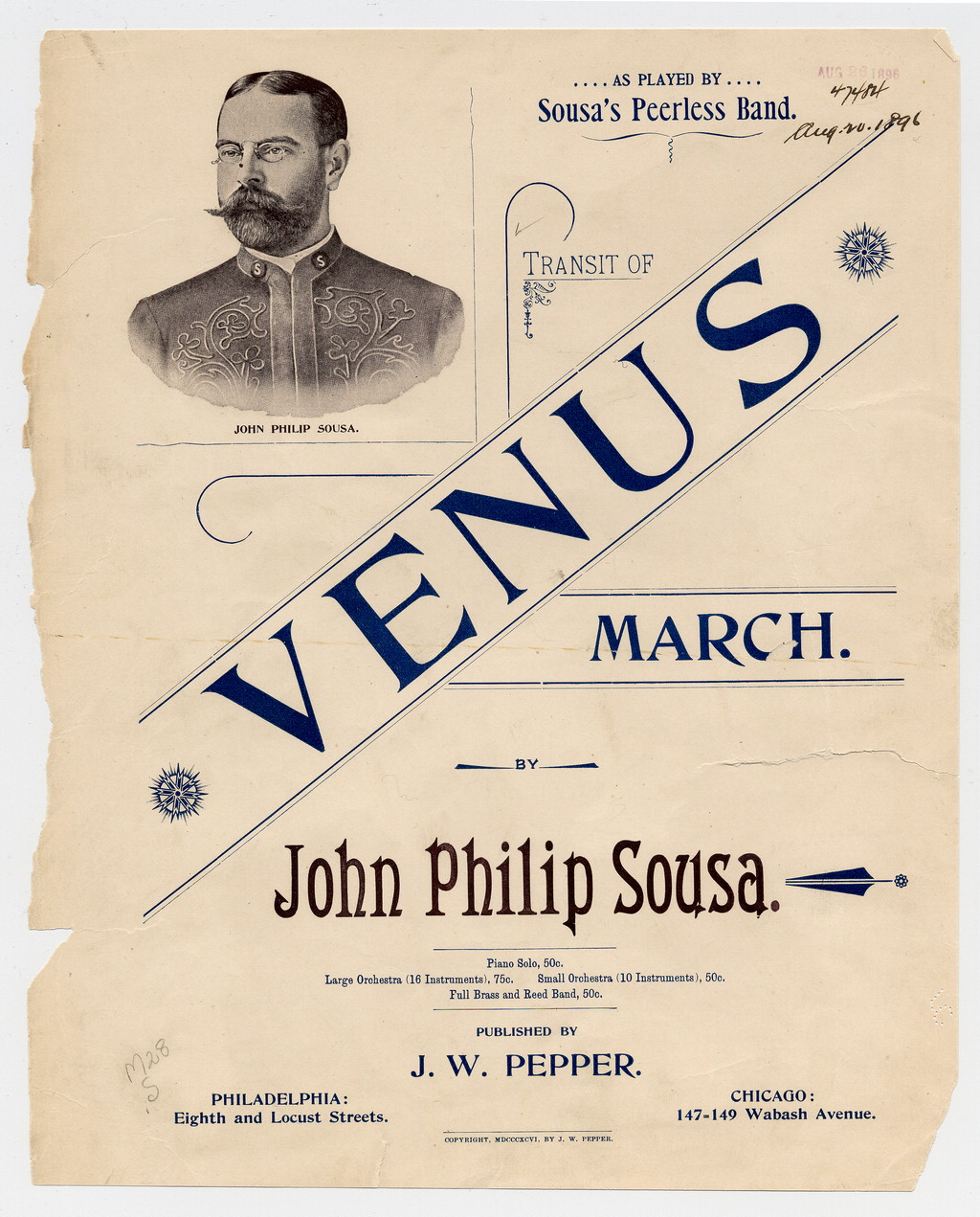
Music sheet of march "Transit of Venus"

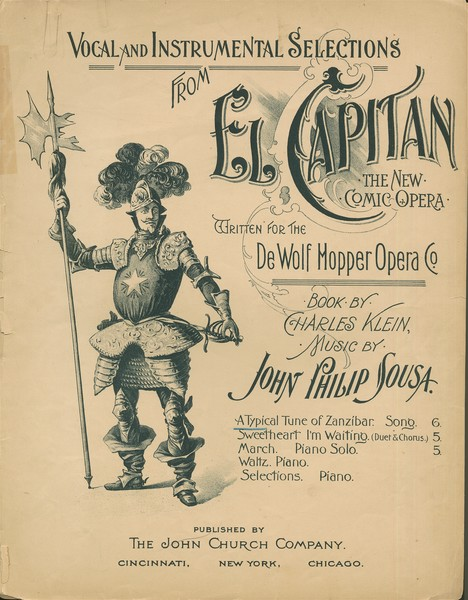
Music sheet of march "El Capitan"

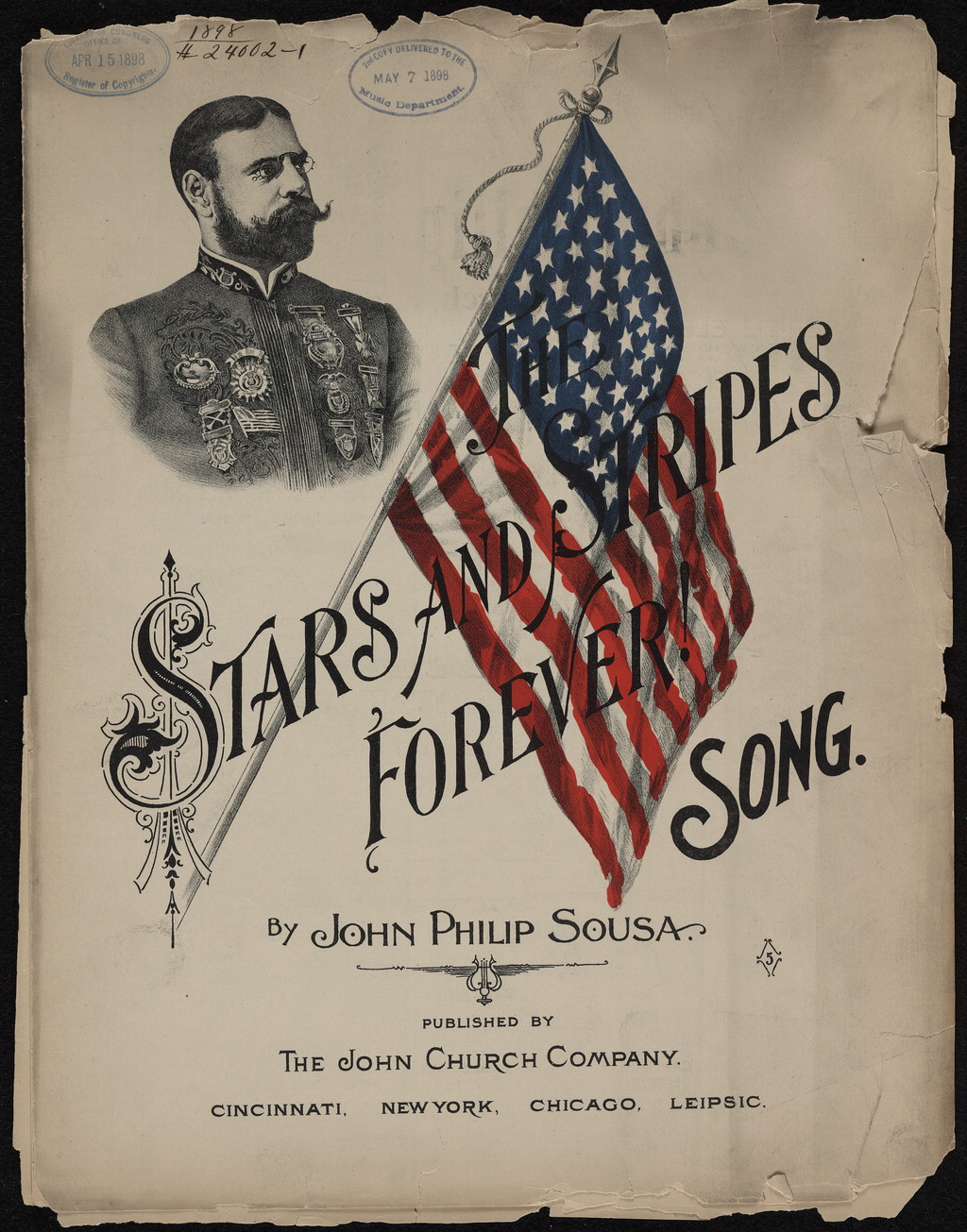
Music sheet of march "The Stars and Stripes Forever"

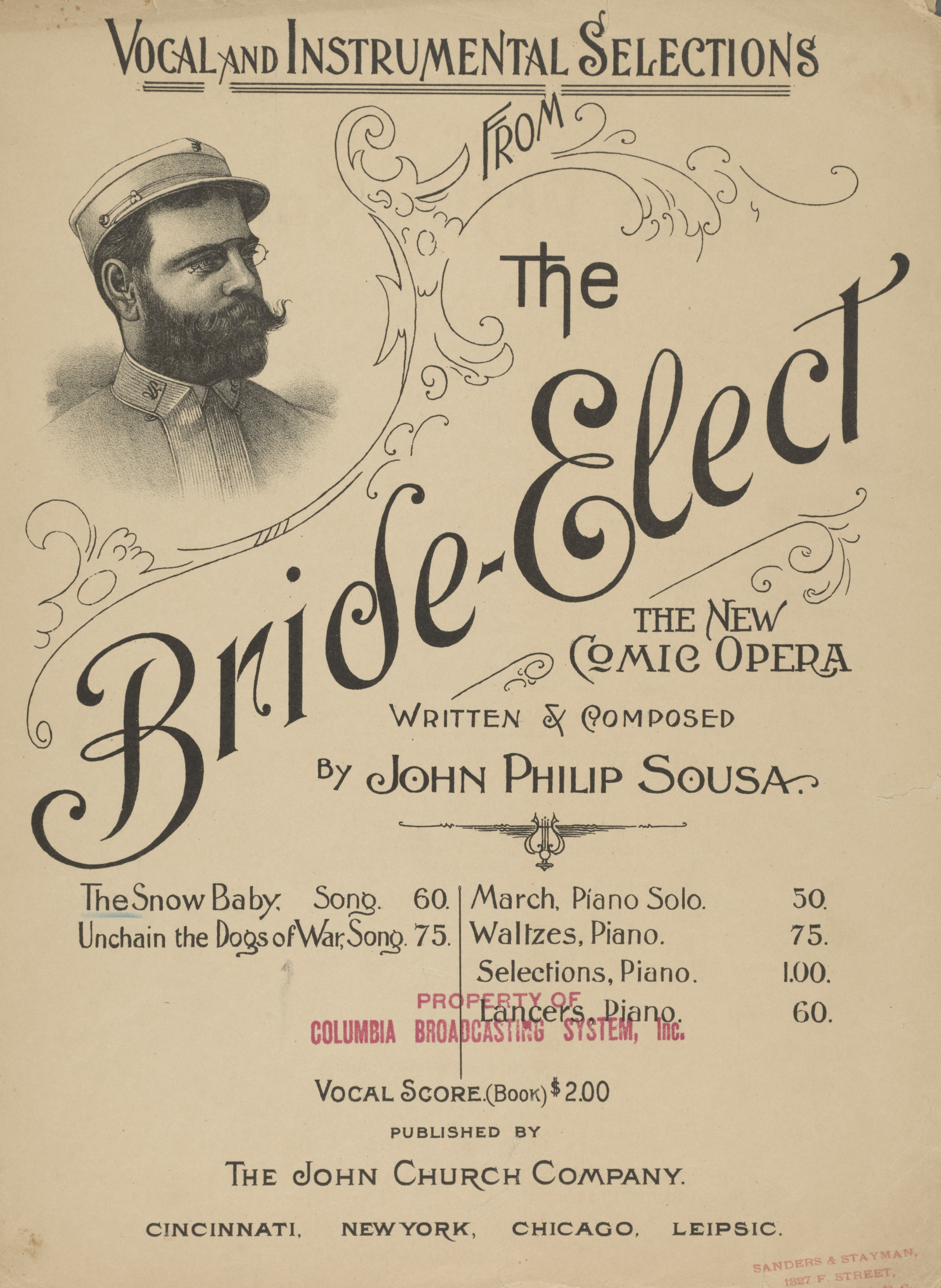
Music sheet of march "The Bride Elect"

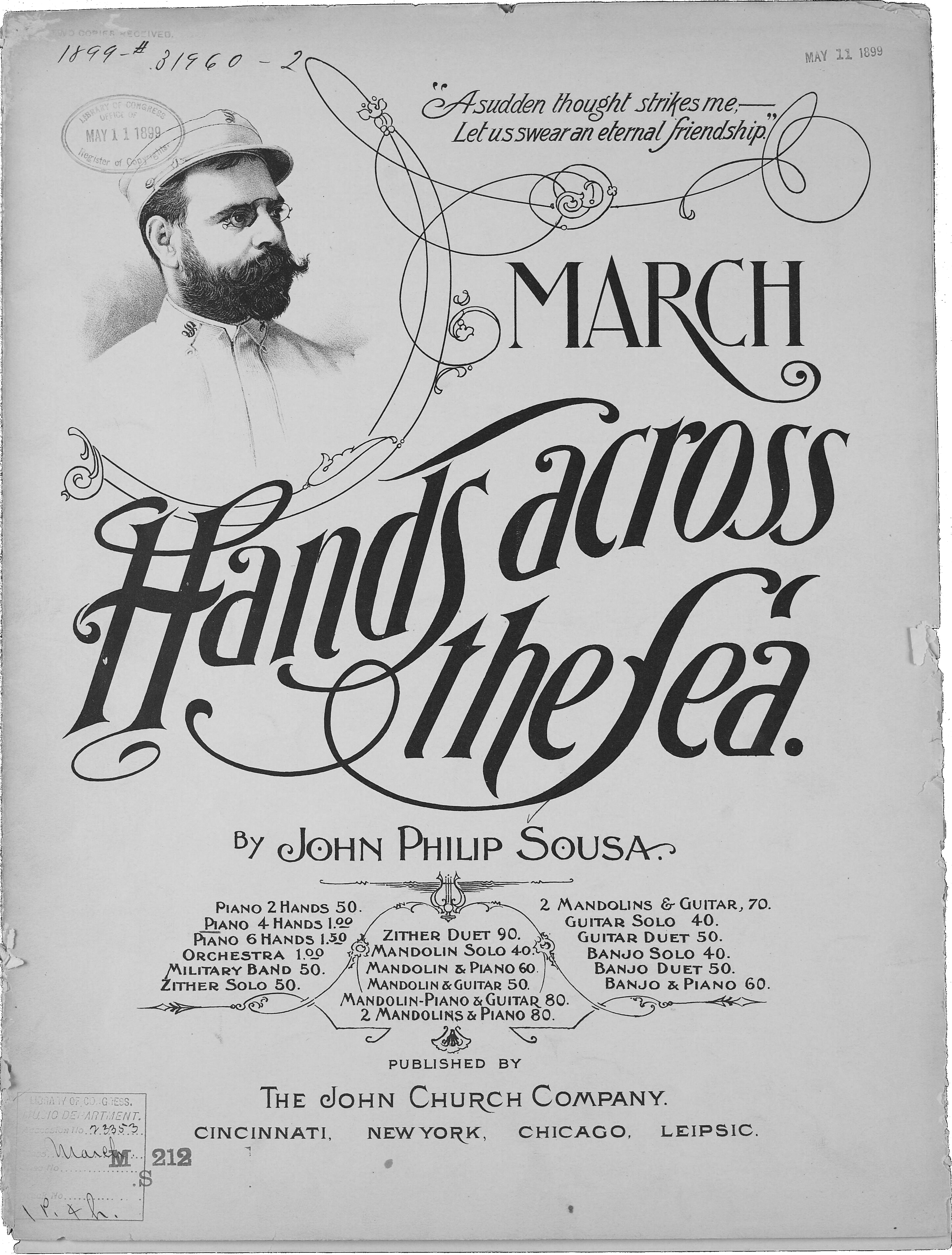
Music sheet of march "Hands Across the Sea"

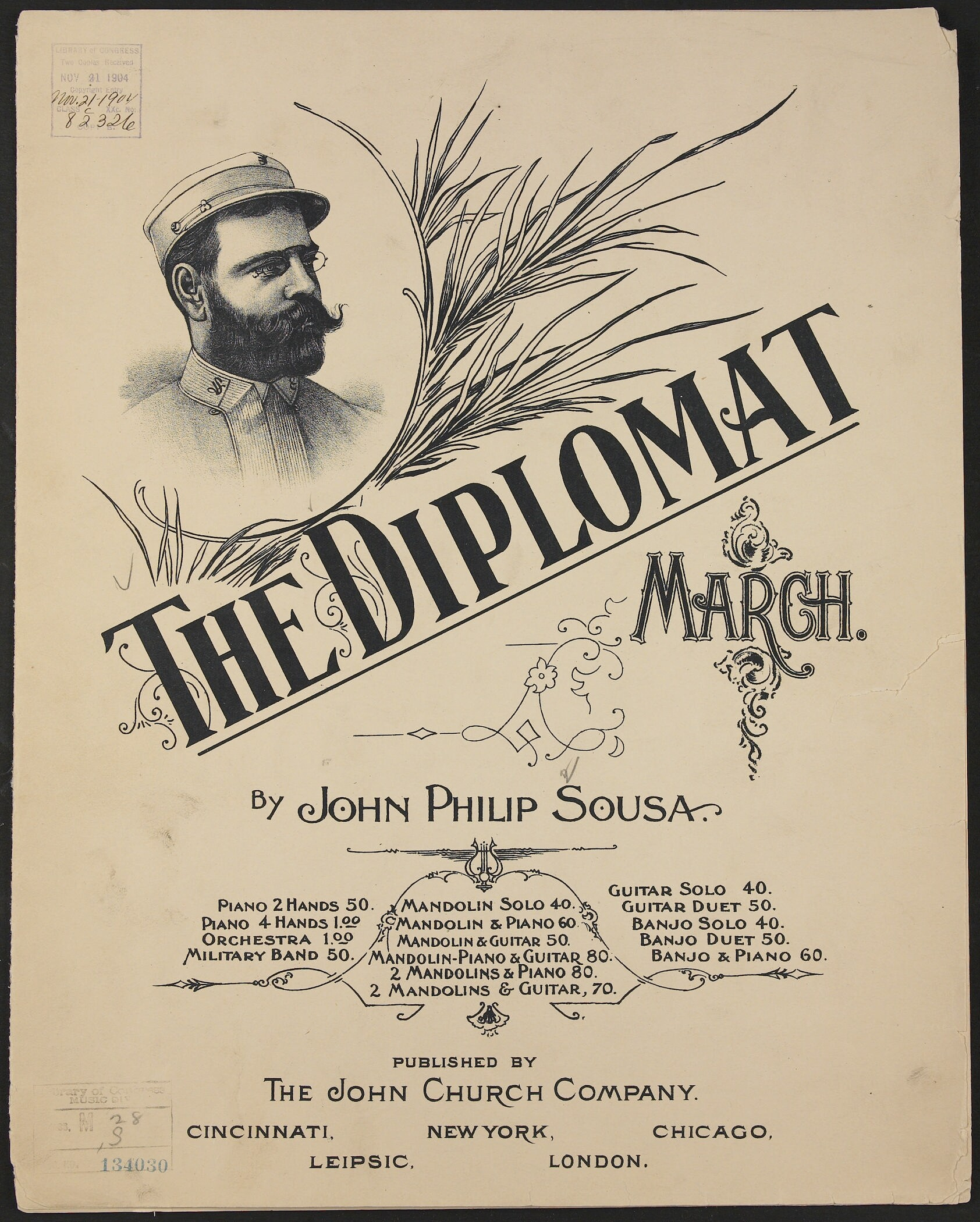
Music sheet of march "The Diplomat"

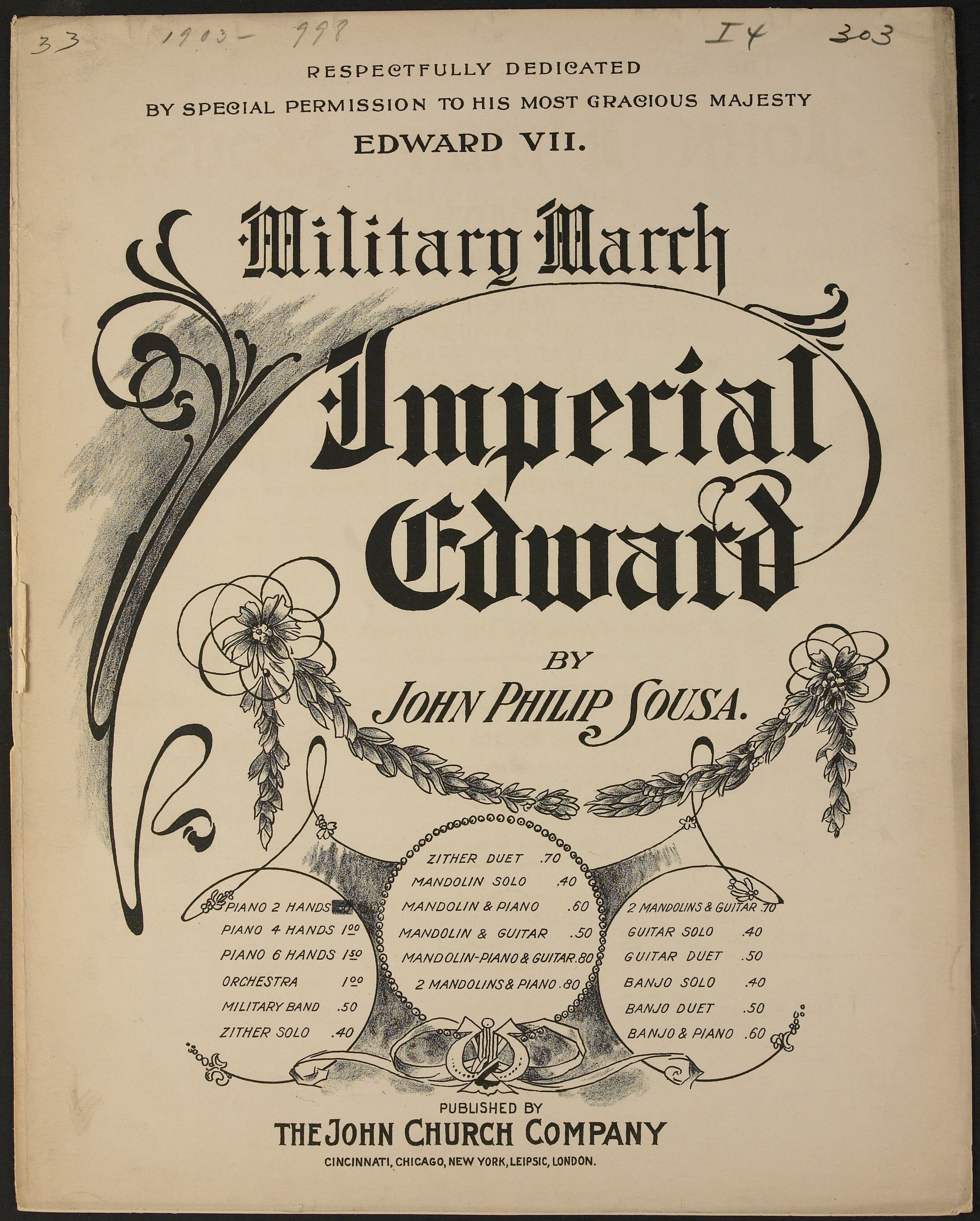
Music sheet of march "Imperial Edward"

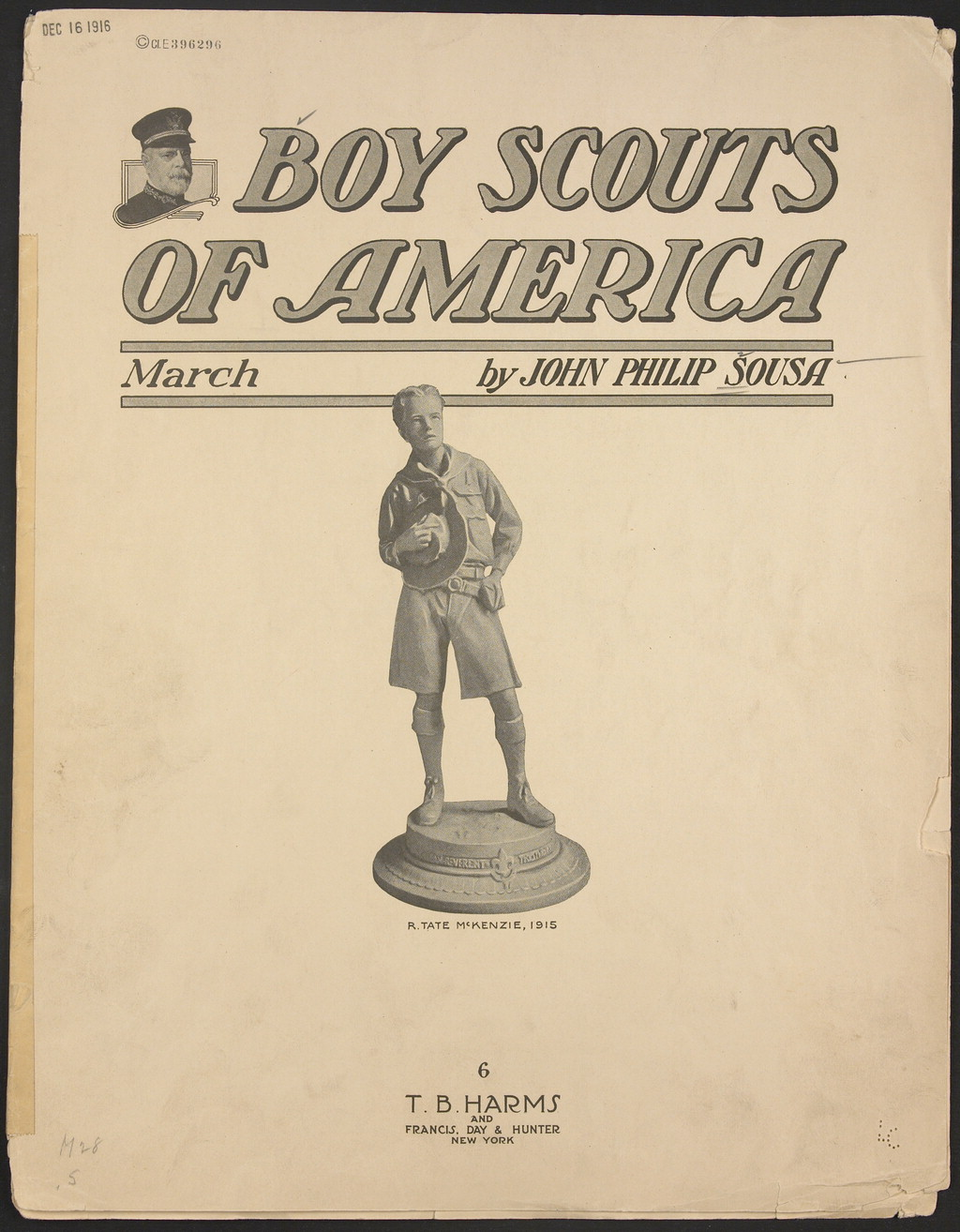
Music sheet of march "Boy Scouts of America"

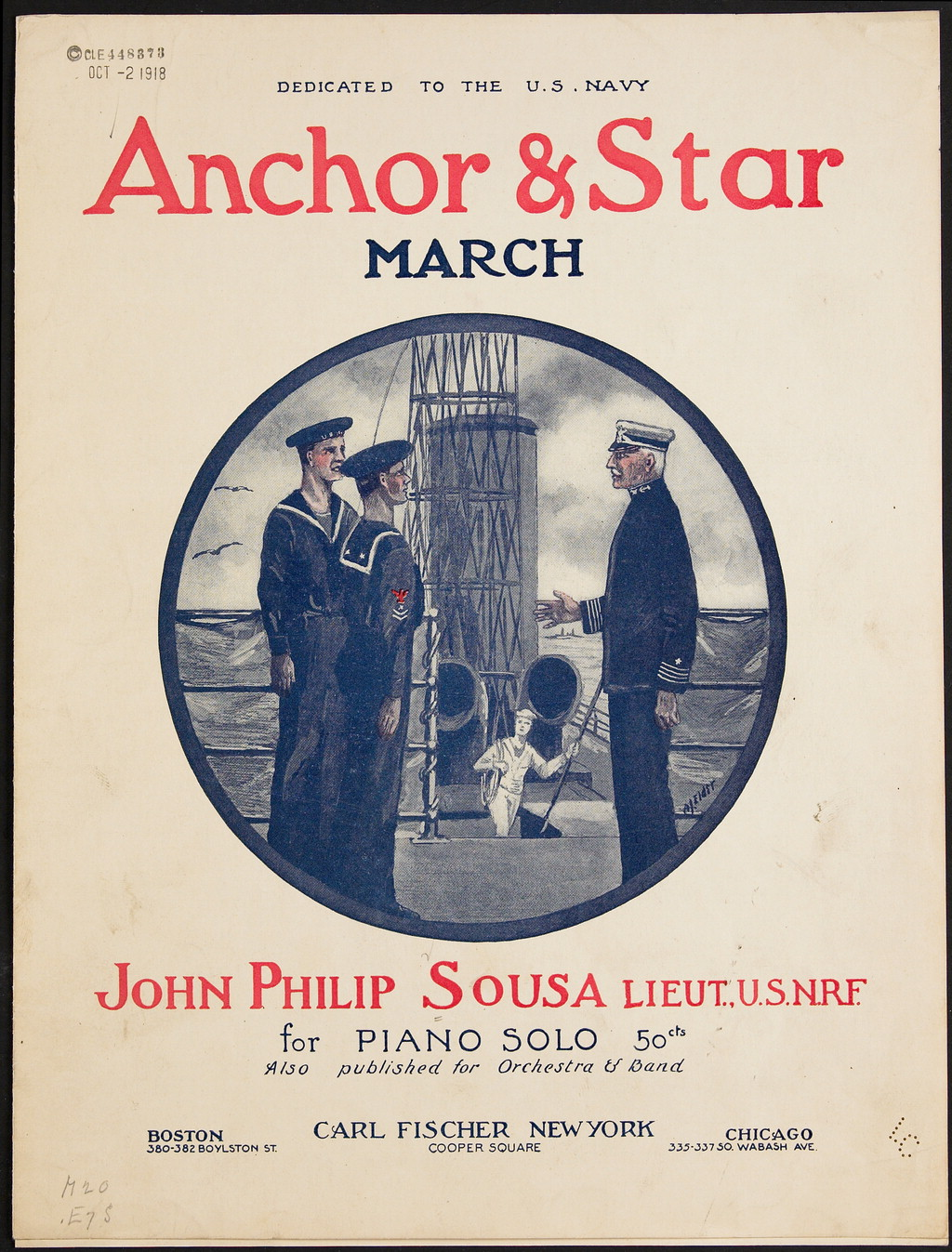
Music sheet of march "Anchor & Star"

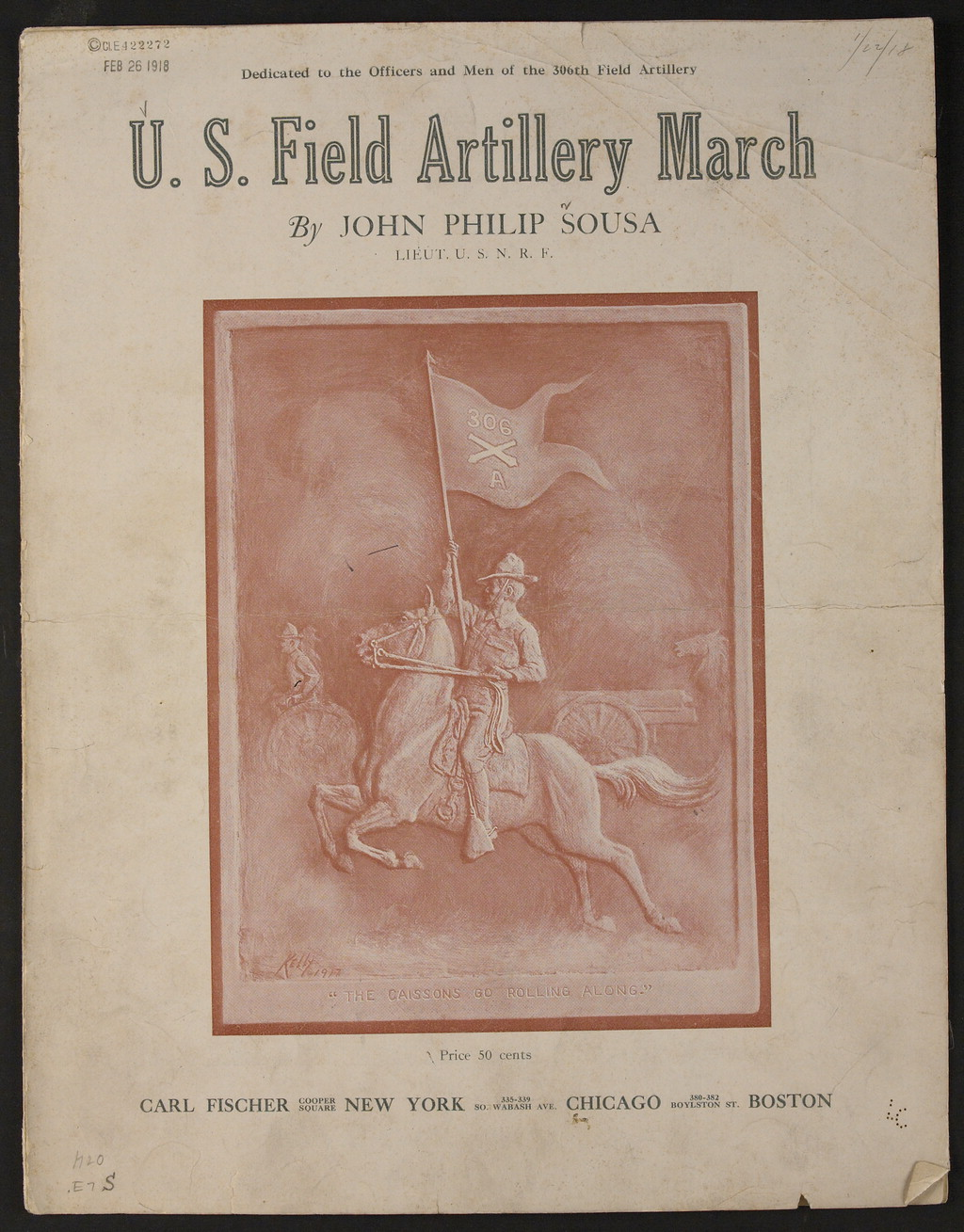
Music sheet of march "U.S. Artillery March"

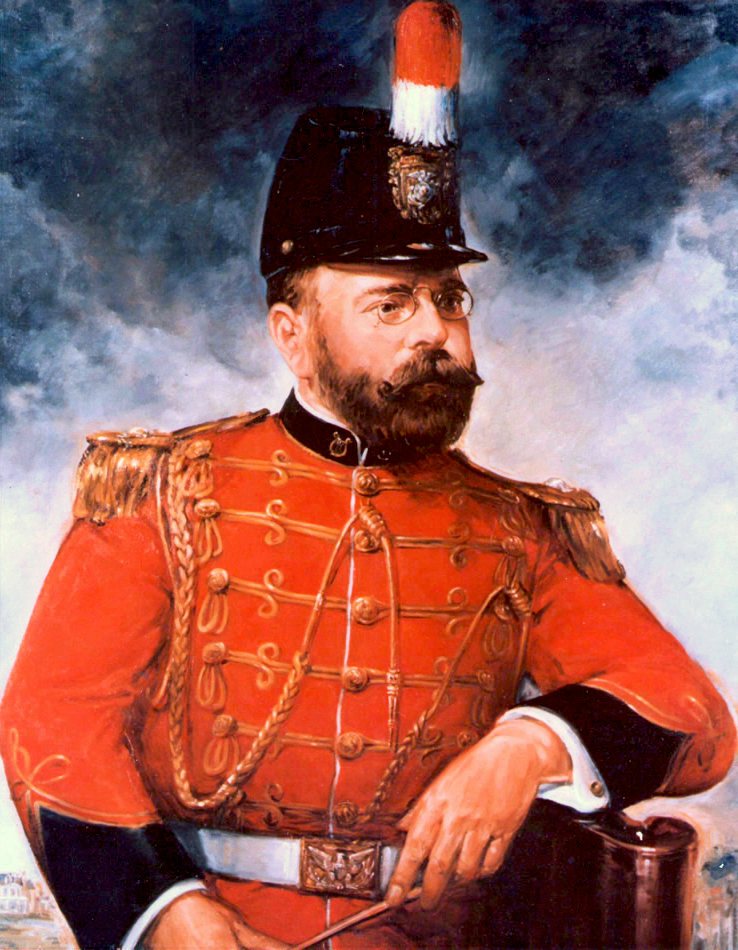
Sousa's portrait as leader of the United States Marine Band

== Notes and references ==
=== Work cited ===
- Bierley, Paul E (1984). The Works of John Philip Sousa. Columbus, Ohio: Integrity Press. ISBN 978-0-918048-04-2. LCCN 84080665. OL 2876313M.
