= Nobles of the Mystic Shrine (march) =

March by John Philip Sousa

- March by John Philip Sousa
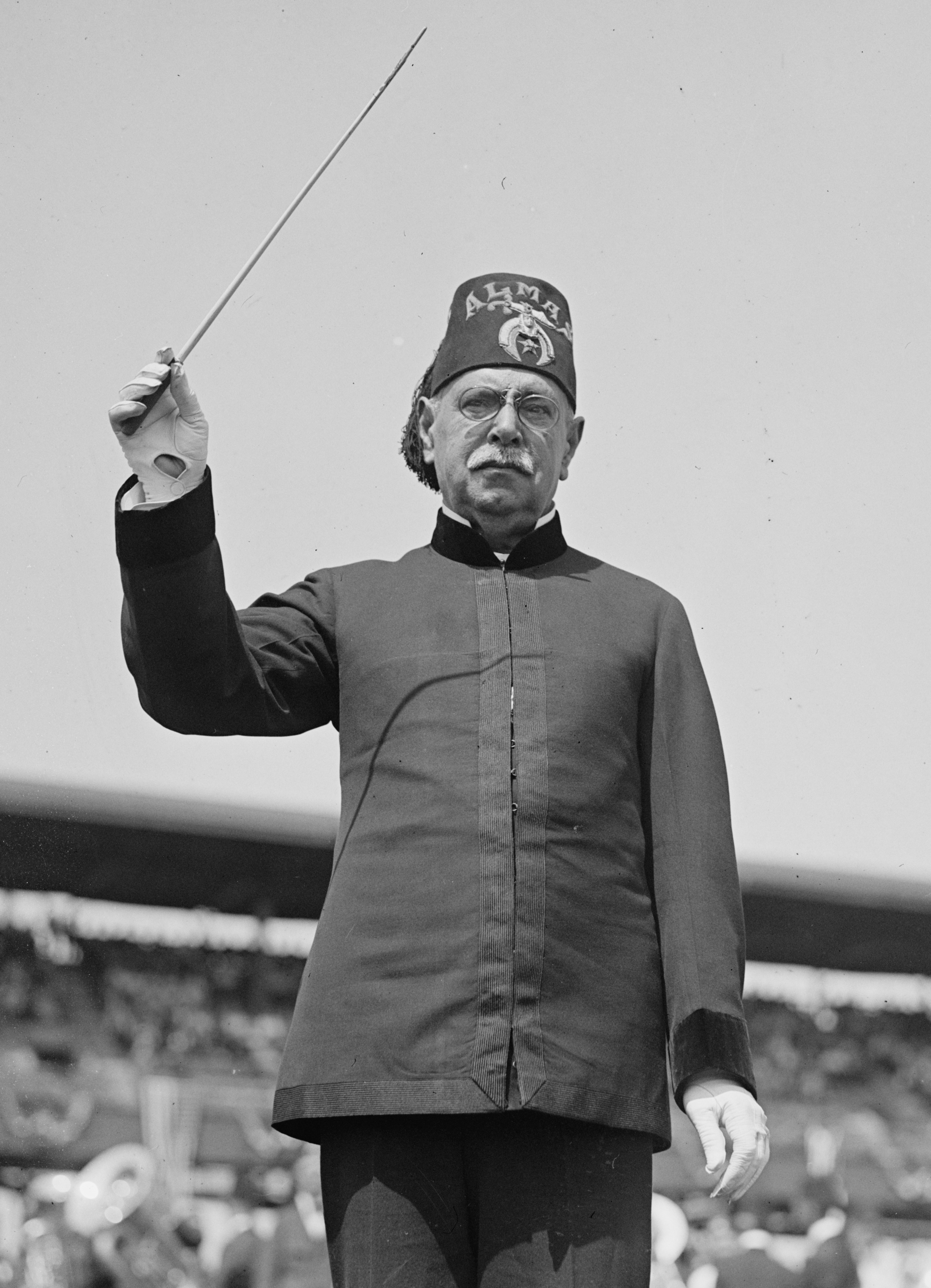
- Sousa at the Shriners' National Convention, June 7, 1923
- Form: March
- Composed: 1923
- Dedication: Ancient Arabic Order of the Nobles of the Mystic Shrine
- Duration: 3 minutes 30 seconds

Premiere
- Date: June 1923
- Location: Griffith Stadium, Washington, D.C.

Audio sample
- "Nobles of the Mystic Shrine" as performed by the United States Marine Band.: file; help

"Nobles of the Mystic Shrine" is a march composed by John Philip Sousa upon the request of his nephew, A. R. Varela. Sousa dedicated the march to the Almas Temple and the Ancient Arabic Order of the Nobles of the Mystic Shrine. It was first conducted in June 1923, with a band of around 6,200 members—the largest Sousa had ever conducted. It is one of the few Sousa marches with the first strain written in the minor mode. Contemporary versions of the march recorded by the Ottoman military band also use the Jingling Johnny in the final strain.

== Background ==
John Philip Sousa was an American composer and conductor. He served as the director of the United States Marine Band from 1880 to 1892. During his tenure, he was popularly referred to as the "March King". In 1881, Sousa became a Freemason and on November 18 the same year, he was raised to a third-degree mason. After leaving the marine band, Sousa started his own band, which he later called "Sousa's Band". In April 1922, Sousa became a member of the Ancient Arabic Order of the Nobles of the Mystic Shrine (AAONMS). He was soon named their first honorary director.

== Composition and analysis ==
On the request of his nephew, A. R. Varela, Sousa composed a march titled "Nobles of the Mystic Shrine". According to author Paul E. Bierley, "The new march saluted Shriners", but was specifically dedicated to the Almas Temple and the AAONMS.

"Nobles of the Mystic Shrine" is one of the few of Sousa's marches in which the introduction and the first strain is written in the minor mode. The march is approximately 3 minutes 30 seconds long. The introduction begins in a minor key, which drops to mezzo-forte during the first strain. According to the Marine Band, Sousa added triangles to the first strain to "reinforce the mystical theme of the march". Piccolo, E♭ Clarinet, cornets, trumpets, trombones, and cymbals are tacet during most of the second strain. The trio has been referred by the Marine Band as one of Sousa's "most elegant trio melodies". Bells are first played during the trio. In the break strain, all the instruments are played back with a subito fortissimo (sff). A diminuendo is also added to the percussion instruments. In the final strain, all the instruments are played with a sff. A Jingling Johnny bell tower is also added, which is played, according to the Marine Band, to "bring home the exotic character" of the march.

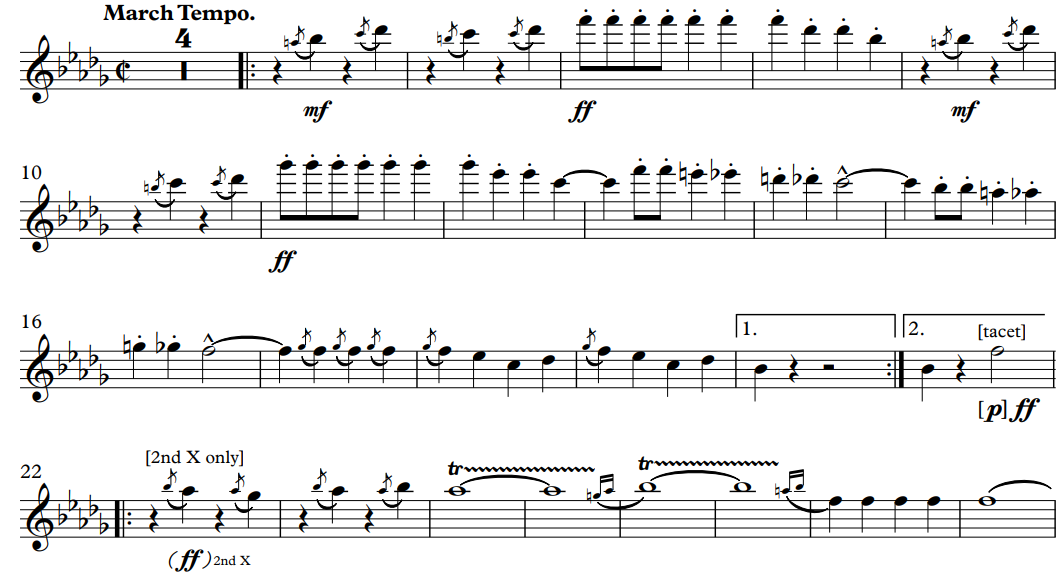
Piccolo introduction and first strain score from the official United States Marine band score.

The structure of the march is:

- Introduction: F major
- First strain: B♭ minor
- Second strain: D♭ major
- Trio: G♭ major
- Break strain: B♭ minor
- Final strain: G♭ major

=== Instrumentation ===
English composer Philip Sparke made few changes to the march, and the instrumentation of his version included:

Woodwind
1 piccolo
1 flute
1 oboe
1 E♭ clarinet
3 clarinets
1 bass clarinet
1 bassoon
1 alto saxophone
1 tenor saxophone
1 baritone saxophone

Brass
3 trumpets
4 horns
3 trombones
1 euphonium
1 tuba
Percussion
snare drum
bass drum
crash cymbal
tambourine
triangle

== Performance ==
The march was first conducted during the Shriners' National Convention in Washington, D.C., in June 1923. At the Griffith Stadium, Sousa conducted a band of around 6,200 members—the largest he had ever conducted. Sousa was wearing a navy-blue uniform and a red Almas Shrine fez. He conducted the march twice before conducting "The Thunderer". Various Shriners accompanied Sousa during his tours, and during the later years of Sousa's band, the majority of his members were Shriners. Contemporary versions of the march by the Ottoman military band also use the Jingling Johnny with the fortissimo.
