= Anchor and Star =

American Song

Anchor & Star
- by John Philip Sousa
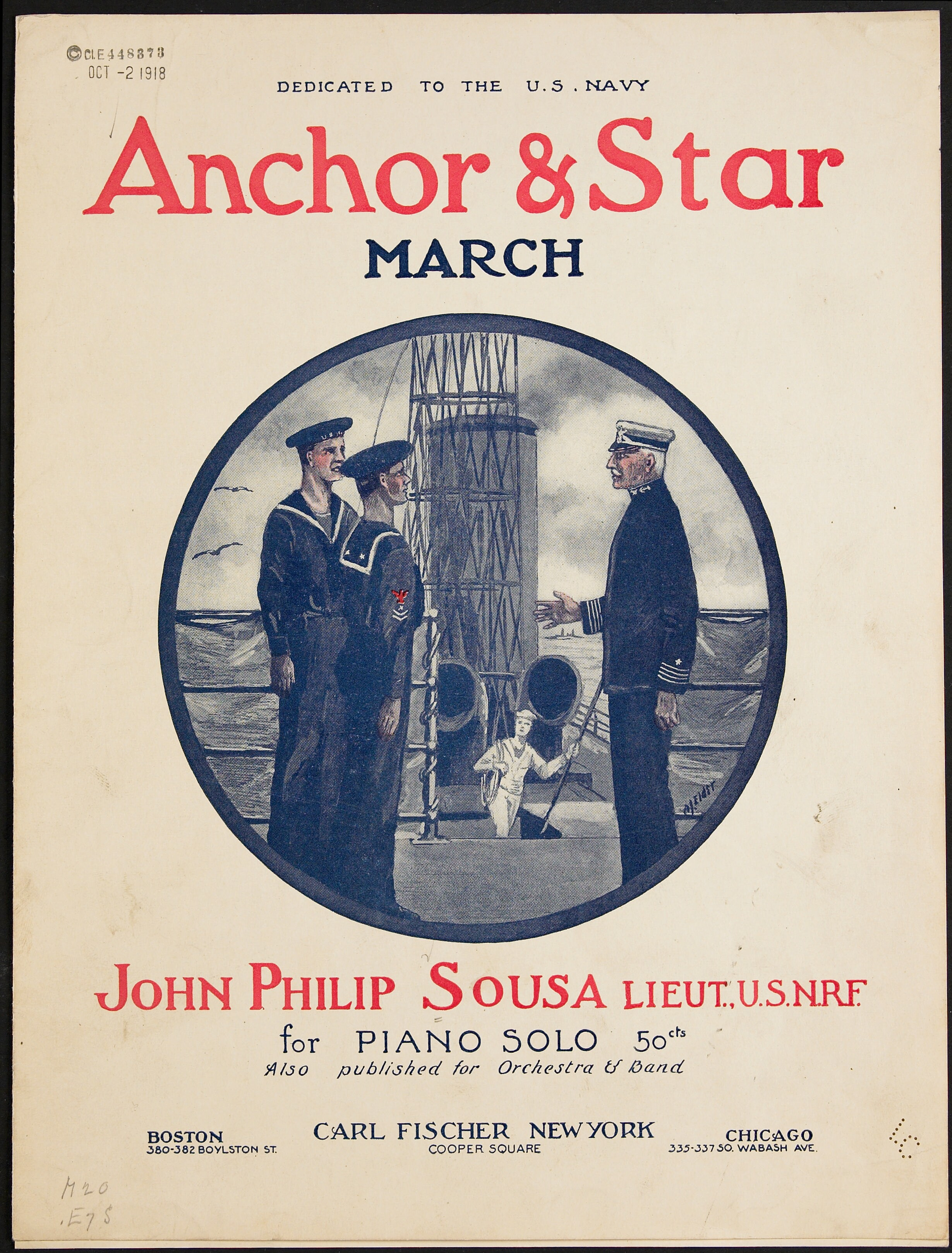
- Year: 1918
- Genre: March
- Published: 1918, New York
- Publisher: Carl Fischer

Audio sample
- United States Marine Band performing the march: file; help

"Anchor & Star" is an American military march composed by John Philip Sousa in 1918, while he served as leader of the U.S. Navy Battalion Band at the Great Lakes Naval Training Center during the First World War.

== History ==
Sousa wearing his U.S. Navy Reserve uniform, holding a copy of Great Lakes Recruit magazine

On May 31, 1917, not long after the United States declared war on Germany and entered World War I, Sousa was commissioned as a Lieutenant Commander in the U.S. Naval Reserve, serving as leader of the Navy Band at the Great Lakes Naval Station near Chicago, Illinois. While "known most often" for his service as leader of the U.S. Marine Band, Sousa's commission as a naval Lieutenant Commander was the first time he had served as a commissioned officer in the military; it also was the first time in history that any U.S. Navy musician had become a commissioned officer. At the time he entered the Navy, Sousa was 62 years old.

Sousa composed "Anchor & Star” in 1918 while serving as bandleader for the U.S. Navy Battalion Band at the Great Lakes Naval Training Center. Sousa dedicated his march “To the U.S. Navy." Much as his march "Globe and Eagle" was named after the Marine Corps emblem, Sousa named "Anchor and Star" after the emblem of the U.S. Navy.

Sousa's naval service was a great success, as "young musicians rushed to enlist and learn under him in the recruit training band." He formed a large band of 350 members, and toured with it in cities in support of "Liberty Loan bonds, the Red Cross, Navy relief and recruiting." Sousa's navy tours ultimately raised over $21 million for the war effort.

== Musical structure ==
"Anchor & Star" is often compared with another Sousa march, "Semper Fidelis" (the official march of the U.S. Marine Corps), as the two pieces have "a resemblance in construction, rhythm, key, and contrapuntal devices."

== See also ==
- List of marches by John Philip Sousa
