= The Invincible Eagle =

1901 military march by John Philip Sousa

- by John Philip Sousa
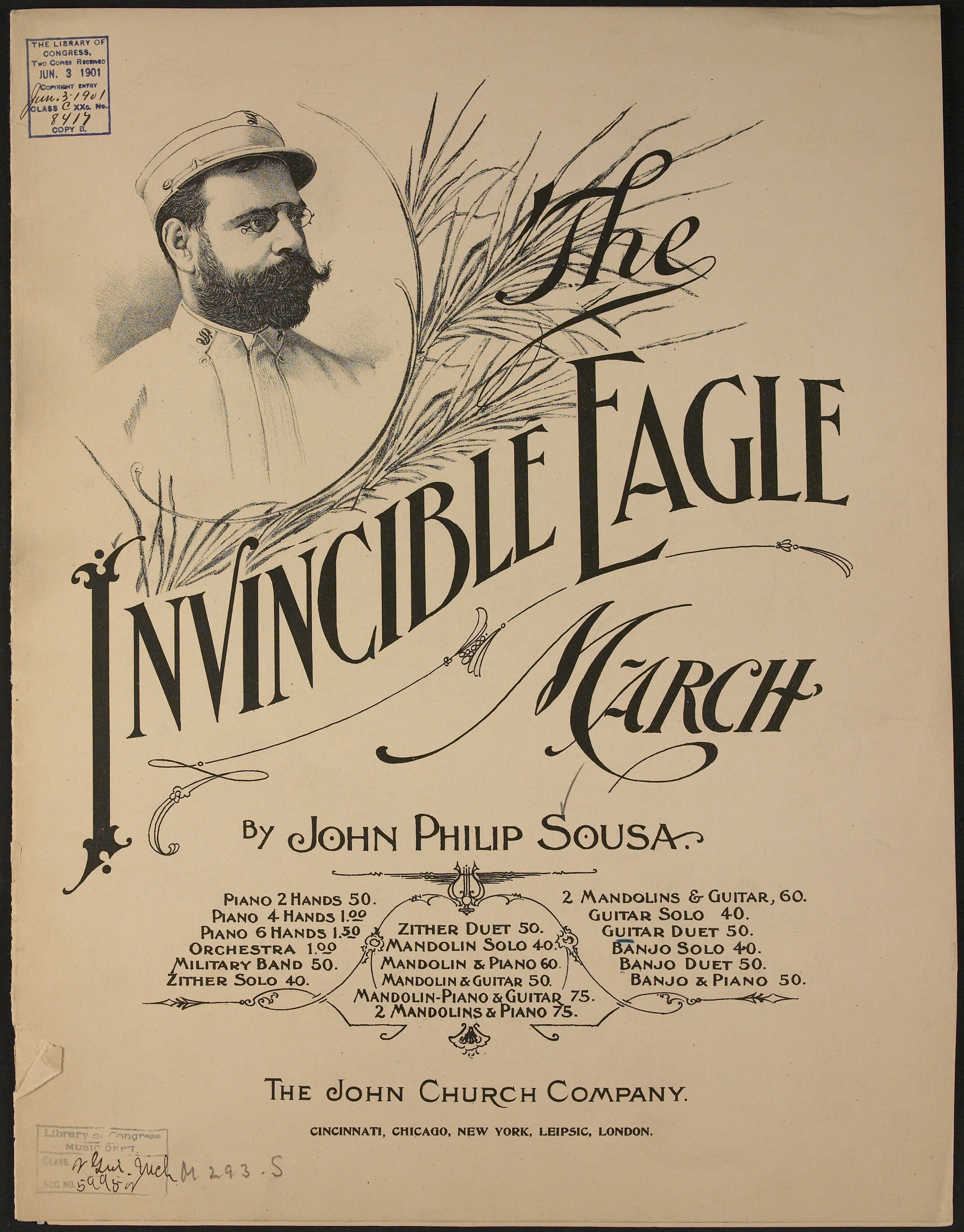
- Year: 1901
- Genre: March
- Dedication: The Pan-American Exposition
- Published: 1901, Cincinnati
- Publisher: John Church Company

Audio sample
- U.S. Air Force Heartland of America Band performing the march: file; help

"The Invincible Eagle" is an American military march composed in 1901 by John Philip Sousa and dedicated to the 1901 Pan-American Exposition held in Buffalo, New York. Sousa began composing the march during an evening train trip between Buffalo and New York City, sketching his ideas in a pocket notebook.

== History ==
In his 1984 book, The Works of John Philip Sousa, Paul E. Bierley shared the account of Blanche Duffield, soprano of the Sousa Band, who witnessed Sousa working on “The Invincible Eagle” during a 1901 train trip:

"It was [on] a train between Buffalo and New York. Outside the coach the lights of towns along the route flashed by like ghosts fluttering at the window panes. The night was dark and the few stars above twinkled fitfully. Mr. Sousa sat in his chair in the dimly lit Pullman. At the further end of the car a porter diligently brushed cushions. At intervals the engine whistled as if in pain.

"Suddenly and without previous warning Mr. Sousa began to describe circles in the air with a pencil, jerking back and forth in his seat meanwhile. Gradually the circumference of his pencil’s arcs diminished and Mr. Sousa drew a notebook from his pocket, still humming to himself. Notebook and pencil met. Breves and semi-breves appeared on the page’s virgin surface. Quarter notes and sixteenth notes followed in orderly array. Meanwhile Mr. Sousa furrowed his brow and from his pursed lips came a stirring air—rather a martial blare, as if hidden trombones, tubas, and saxophones were striving to gain utterance. Now Mr. Sousa’s pencil traveled faster and faster, and page after page of the notebook were turned back, each filled with martial bars. [I] looked on from over the top of a magazine and listened with enthusiasm as Mr. Sousa’s famous march, “The Invincible Eagle,” took form."

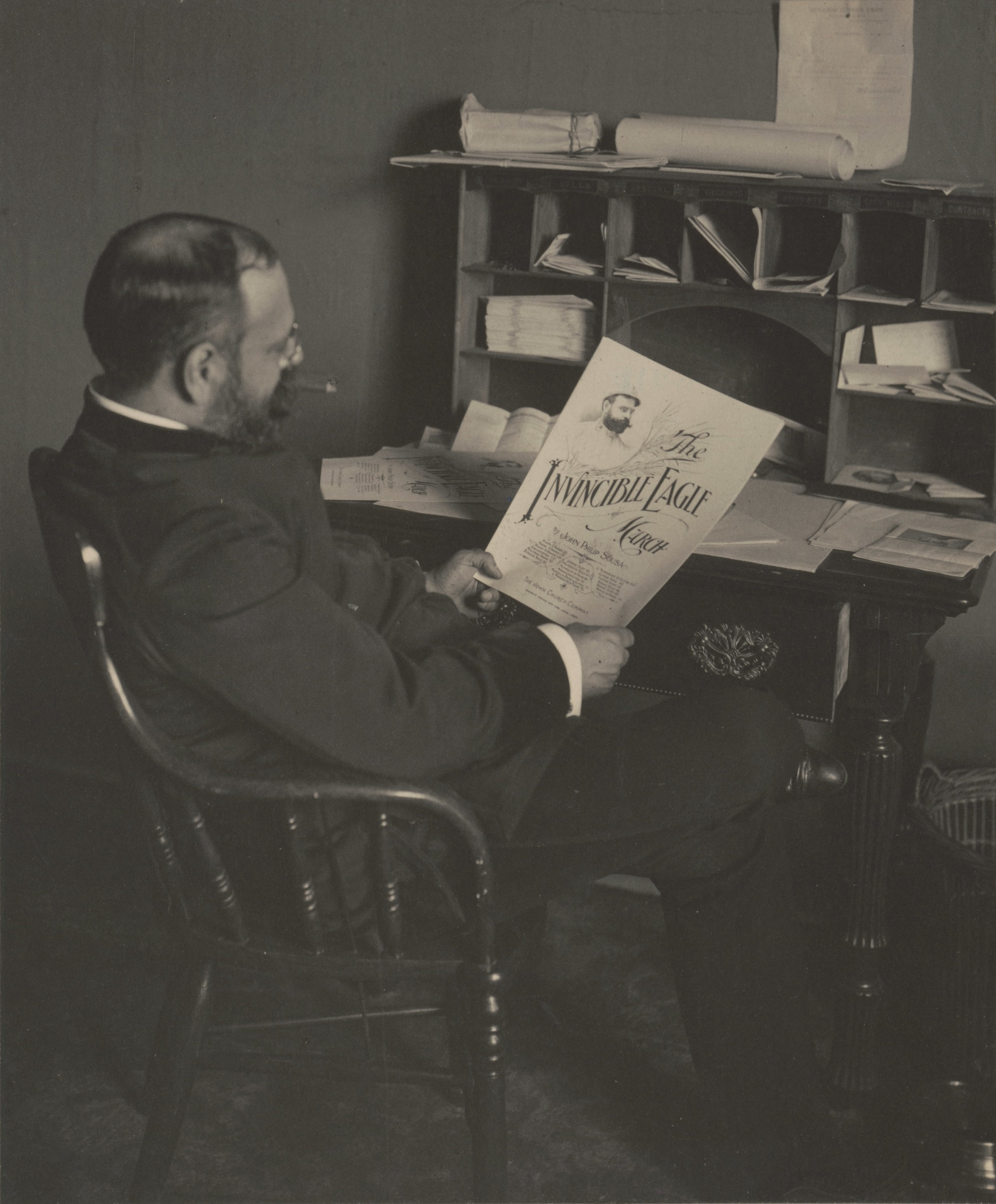
Sousa holding a copy of the sheet music for “The Invincible Eagle"

Originally, Sousa thought “The Invincible Eagle” would surpass “The Stars and Stripes Forever” as a patriotic composition. Sousa dedicated his march to the Pan-American Exposition, which was held in Buffalo in the summer of 1901. He wrote the march for his band's performance at the exposition, and originally considered naming it the “Spirit of Niagara." Soon after “The Invincible Eagle" premiered, Sousa remarked:

"It is what I call one of my sunshine marches. Some of my heavy marches are intended to convey the impression of the stir and strife of warfare, but The Invincible Eagle shows the military spirit at its lightest and brightest – the parade spirit ... with the bravery of uniform, the sheen of silken stands, and the gleam of polished steel."

U.S. Army Band performing the march.

The band of Francesco Fanciulli, who served as director of the U.S. Marine Band between 1892 and 1897, also performed at the exposition. However, "The Invincible Eagle" proved a more enduring musical work than Fanciulli's “The Electric Century."

== Use as a U.S. military service song ==
Before adopting “Semper Supra” as its official service song in September 2022, the U.S. Space Force used an excerpt of “The Invincible Eagle” as its official interim march. The portion of the march used was named "The U.S. Space Force March" and was to be played for "ceremonies and gatherings of the USSF and anywhere a musical representation of America’s Space Professionals [was] needed." It was designated as the official march in 2020.

== See also ==
- List of marches by John Philip Sousa
