= Columbia's Pride =

1914 patriotic march by John Philip Sousa

- by John Philip Sousa
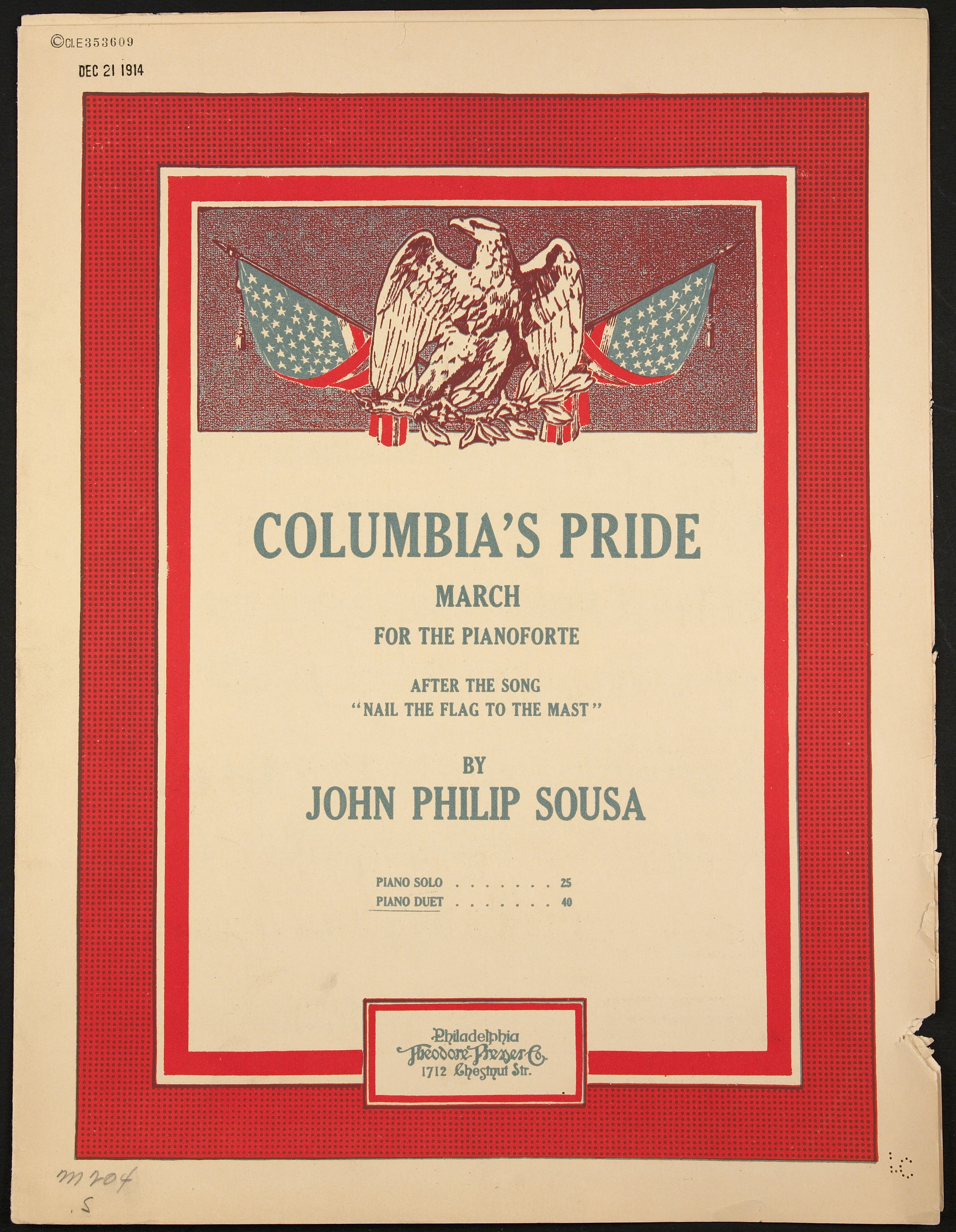
- Year: 1914
- Genre: March
- Published: 1914, Philadelphia
- Publisher: Theodore Presser Co.

Audio sample
- United States Marine Band performing the march: file; help

"Columbia's Pride" is a patriotic American march composed by John Philip Sousa in 1914, based on his 1890 song, "Nail the Flag to the Mast." "Columbia's Pride" was published in 1914 by Theodore Presser Co. in Philadelphia as a score for piano.

== History ==
In 1890, Sousa wrote his song “Nail the Flag to the Mast,” using a poem by William Russell Frisbe for the lyrics. In 1914, to compose "Columbia's Pride," Sousa "modified the melody and rhythm, added a change of key, and shortened" his song, in addition to removing the words. The 1914 Theodore Presser Co. score of the march states it was composed 'After the song "Nail the Flag to the Mast."' Sousa composed "Columbia's Pride" for piano, and "apparently never arranged [it] for band or orchestra." However, the United States Marine Band has performed the march arranged for band by Gay Corrie.

== See also ==
- List of marches by John Philip Sousa
