= Boy Scouts of America (march) =

1916 march by John Philip Sousa

- March by John Philip Sousa
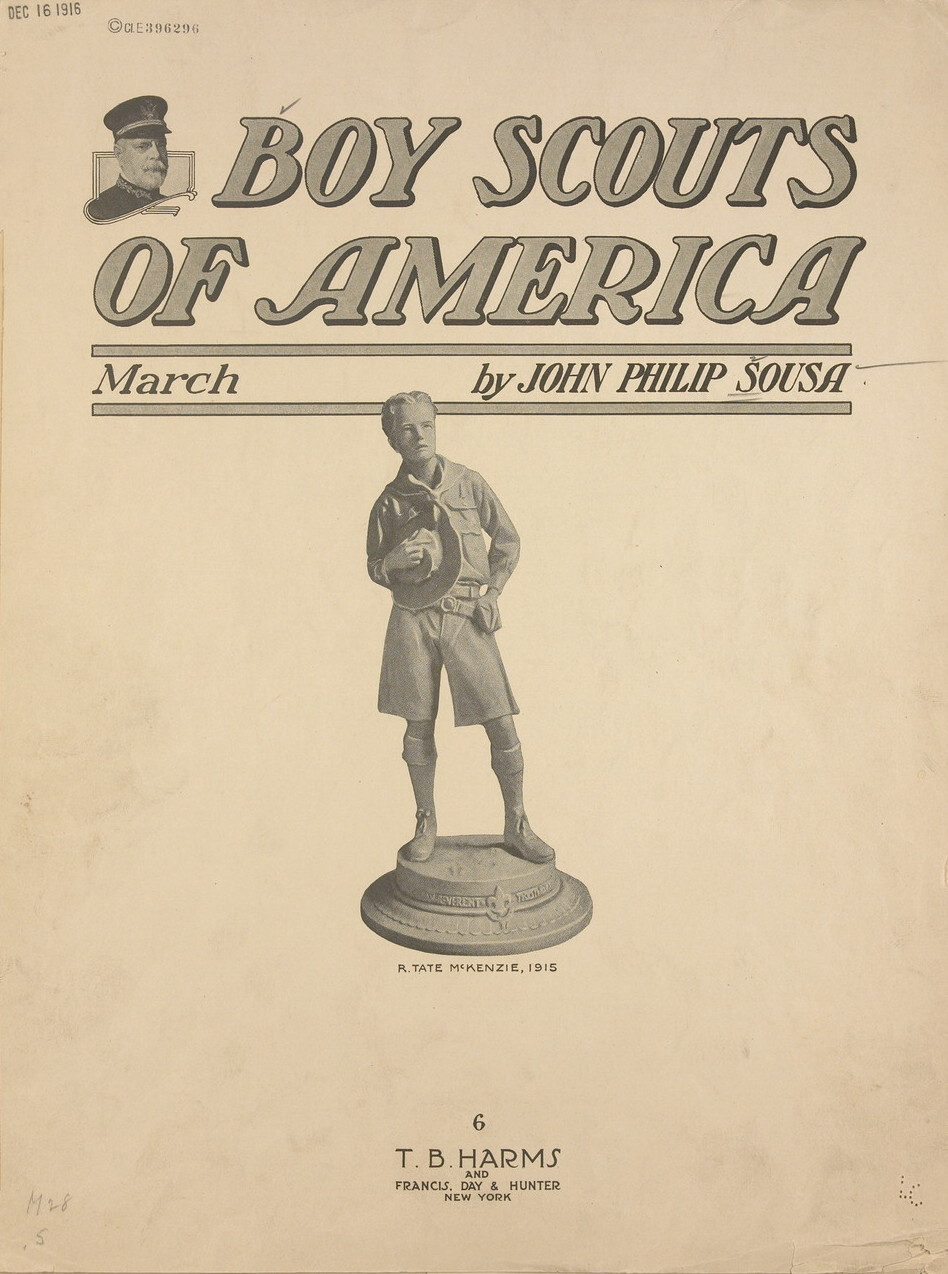
- Original music sheet cover
- Composed: 1916
- Dedication: Boy Scouts of America

Audio sample
- "Boy Scouts of America" as performed by the United States Marine Band.: file; help

Boy Scouts of America is a march composed by John Philip Sousa in 1916 upon the request of Charles D. Hart. Sousa dedicated it to the Boy Scouts of America. It was premiered in October 1916 at the Metropolitan Opera House. The cover sheet features a photograph of a statuette R. Tait McKenzie's The Ideal Scout. It is considered one of the best marches Sousa ever composed, with The Reading Times writing that the march proved that the "noted composer still retains the name of 'March King'".

== Background ==
John Philip Sousa was an American composer and conductor. He served as the director of the United States Marine Band from 1880 to 1892. During his tenure, he was popularly referred to as the "March King". In 1892, after leaving the marine band, Sousa started his own band, which he later called "Sousa's Band". The Boy Scouts of America was formed in 1910; Sousa considered it a "wonderful and powerful force toward the making of true Americanism and good citizens".

== History ==
At the request of Charles D. Hart, president of the Philadelphia Council of the Boy Scouts, Sousa composed a march titled "Boy Scouts of America" and dedicated it to the Boy Scouts. It was first rehearsed on October 20, 1916, at the Metropolitan Opera House, and received its first public hearing there later that month.

Soon after its premiere, it was considered one of the best marches Sousa ever composed. An early review wrote that the march "... absolutely breathes the boy; it visualizes the supple step of the boy marching, and not the heavy tread of the man." The Reading Times wrote that the march proved that the "noted composer still retains the name of 'March King'". The cover page of the music sheet features a photograph of a statuette of The Ideal Scout by R. Tait McKenzie, which Hart had gifted to Sousa. Booth Tarkington was initially selected to write the lyrics, but the Marine Band claims that there is no evidence that he wrote any. The Boy Scouts announced that the march would be adopted as their official march, but it never was. Thanking Sousa for the march, the Boy Scouts gifted Sousa a "silver loving cup" on November 6, 1916, Sousa's sixty-second birthday.

== Structure and analysis ==
The structure of the march, according to the Marine Band's score is:

- Introduction (m. 1–4)
- First strain (m. 4–36)
- Second strain (m. 36–44)
- First strain reprise (m. 44–76)
- Trio (m. 77–108)
- Break strain (m. 108–124)
- Final strain (m. 125–157)

The introduction begins at the suggested tempo of 122 beats-per-minute. The following first strain immediately drops to mezzo-forte (mf). The percussion accent in m. 28 is stronger than those preceding it, and the subito forzato (sfz) in m. 32 is strongest of all. The second strain features the piccolos. Flutes and cymbals are tacet, while the horns and low brass are played softly. The first strain is repeated after the second strain. E♭ Clarinet, cornets, trombones, and most of the percussion instruments are tacet in the trio section. In the break strain, the cornets and the snare drum is rejoined at fortissimo (ff). Flams are also added to the snare drums. The trio melody without the slurs returns during the final strain. Though they are tacet for most of the part, the cornets and snare drum are played from m. 156.

== Instrumentation ==
The score released by the Marine Band has the following instruments:

- Woodwinds:
  - 1 Piccolo
  - 1 Flute
  - 2 Oboe
  - 1 E♭ Clarinet
  - 3 Clarinets
  - 1 E♭ Alto clarinet
  - 1 Bass clarinet
  - 2 Bassoon
  - 2 Alto saxophone
  - 1 Tenor saxophone
  - 1 Baritone saxophone
- Brass:
  - Solo B♭ Cornet
  - 3 B♭ Cornet
  - 4 French horn
  - 1 Baritone horn
  - 1 Baritone horn T.C.
  - 2 Trombones
  - 1 Bass trombone
  - 1 Tuba
- Percussion:
  - Drums & bells

== See also ==
- List of marches by John Philip Sousa
