= Solid Men to the Front =

Sousa march

- by John Philip Sousa
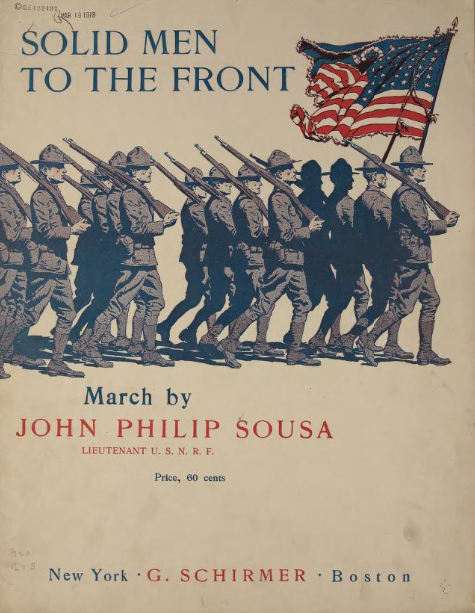
- Original cover for the piano manuscript
- Year: 1918
- Genre: March
- Published: 1918, Boston, New York
- Publisher: G. Schirmer

Audio sample
- United States Marine Band performing the march: file; help

"Solid Men to the Front" is an American military march composed by John Phillip Sousa in 1918. It was composed during Sousa's role as a Lieutenant Commander and a Navy bandmaster during World War I. Both the original piano manuscript as preserved by the U.S. Library of Congress and original scores preserved within the Sousa Encore books have the title as "Solid Men to the Front!", although most publications – including the original manuscript cover page – omit the exclamation mark.

== History ==
When the United States joined the First World War after declaring war on Germany on April 4, 1917, many roles needed to be filled by citizens in order to help support the war effort. John Phillip Sousa, who retired as the Director of the Marine Band in 1892, was soon commissioned a Lieutenant Commander in the U.S. Naval Reserve and was the leader of the Navy Band at Great Lakes Naval Station. Subsequently, he became the first Navy musician to become a commissioned officer.

Sousa's role in the war effort was largely an influential one - raising funds, recruits, and morale. Many young musicians swiftly enrolled in the Navy to join the recruit training band and study under Sousa. With the influx of members, Sousa organized a large band of around 350 musicians that he toured with in major cities, allowing him to raise around 21 million dollars in funds for the war.

Sousa's most noteworthy influence for the war, however, came from the many marches he produced in order to support the soldiers on the front lines. His march "Solid Men to the Front" is most certainly one of these marches, being composed during the height of the war in 1918. Judging by the title of the piece, the intention of the music was likely to pay homage to the soldiers fighting in the war and to portray them as strong and courageous. Alternately, it could have been intended as a propaganda song suggesting that men should enlist for the military because those enlisted are strong - or solid - men.

The title "Solid Men to the Front," however, did not originate from this piece. The title was first used on a manuscript for an earlier march before its name was finalized into "Wisconsin Forward Forever." "Solid Men to the front" was then reused as the title for the piece now known by that name. The name, a Civil War-era catch phrase, had previously been used as the title of a quickstep composed in 1870 by the New York Seventh Regiment band leader Claudio S. Graffulo, who dedicated his piece to Tammany Hall boss William M. Tweed.

While "Solid Men to the Front" is not as popular as Sousa's other marches of the era, many march aficionados regard it as one of his better works.

== Music ==
"Solid Men to the Front" is a military march for 34 parts written in cut time in the I-AA-BB-C-Br-C-Br-C format. It is unusual in its structure as, while most marches have a B section of 16 bars, this march's B section is twice the length at 32 bars.

The full march as preserved in original Sousa Encore book manuscripts and as published by the United States Marine Band opens in the key of Eb Major and has a trio in the key of Ab Major. The original piano manuscript as preserved by the U.S. Library of Congress, however, opens in the key of F Major and has a trio in the key of Bb Major.

As is common with John Phillip Sousa marches, many elements of the song as seen published today were not included in the original Sousa manuscripts. For example, the convention of playing the second strain soft the first time and loud the second time was not at all included in many of Sousa's original manuscripts, including his manuscripts for "Solid Men to the Front." Other changed elements in newer publications include added accents, additional increased dynamic variation, and more fleshed-out bells and snare drum parts.

== Other ==
The United States Marine Band posted a series of videos to their YouTube channel and website from October 27 to November 5, 2020, in which the 28th director of the Marine Band, Colonel Jason K. Fettig. listed his top ten favorite John Phillip Sousa marches. Within the list, Fettig included "Solid Men to the Front" as his fourth-favorite John Phillip Sousa march of all time.

Additionally, the melody from the trio of "Solid Men to the Front" was adopted into the official fight song of the California State Polytechnic University Pomona sometime around 10 years ago

The lyrics to the fight song are as follows:

Fight you Broncos, fight, fight, fight!
Charge on in, get the win, tonight, night, night!
Broncos have the will to score, increase the lead and watch us soar!
That's the way, we end the day, Pomona is here to stay!
Fight you Broncos, fight, fight, fight!
Time to show the other team our might, might, might!
The green and gold will get the win; we are the best there's ever been!
The Broncos of Cal Poly!

== See also ==
- List of marches by John Philip Sousa
- American March Music
- Cal Poly Pomona Broncos
