= The Royal Welch Fusiliers (march) =

1930 military march by John Philip Sousa

- by John Philip Sousa
- Year: 1930
- Genre: March
- Dedication: "Written at the request of the United States Marine Corps in memory of its association with the IInd Battalion of the Royal Welch during the Boxer Rebellion in China in the year 1900."
- Published: 1930, Philadelphia
- Publisher: Theodore Presser Company

Audio sample
- United States Marine Band performing the march: file; help

"The Royal Welch Fusiliers" is a march composed by John Philip Sousa in 1929, and then rewritten in 1930. It is the only march written by Sousa for a British Army regiment.

In 1900 the 2nd Battalion of the Royal Welch Fusiliers was part of the multinational force that lifted the Siege of the International Legations in Peking during the Boxer Rebellion; during this action they served alongside elements of the United States Marine Corps' 1st Marine Regiment. In 1929, at the request of surviving Marine veterans who had served at Peking, the then 75-year-old Sousa composed a tribute march to the British regiment entitled "The Royal Welch Fusiliers." A medley-march, this composition included the “World Turned Upside Down,” “Hymn of the Marines,” “Men of Harlech,” and “God Bless the Prince of Wales.” However, Commandant of the Marine Corps Wendell Cushing Neville, a veteran of Peking, was dissatisfied with this first attempt, and told Sousa in a letter that he would prefer an original composition, so Sousa completed a second version of the march the following year.

Sousa conducting the public premiere of "The Royal Welch Fusiliers" at the White House on May 12, 1930 (no audio).

The march was debuted at the annual Gridiron Club dinner in Washington, D.C. at the Willard Hotel on April 26, 1930 for President Herbert Hoover who was, himself, one of the westerners besieged in Peking thirty years prior. On May 12, the march received its public premiere on the White House lawn. The following summer, Sousa traveled to Tidworth, England, where on June 25 a "beautifully bound score of the march" was presented to the fusiliers during the regiment's anniversary observance of the battle. Sousa also directed the band of the Royal Welch Fusiliers in the performance of his march.

The original score of "The Royal Welch Fusiliers" is at the Museum of the Royal Welch Fusiliers in Caernarfon, Wales.

== See also ==
- List of marches by John Philip Sousa
