= Kansas Wildcats =

March composed by John Philip Sousa

The "Kansas Wildcats" (sometimes called "The Kansas Wildcats March") is a march composed by John Philip Sousa. He composed the march after a petition from students and faculty from the Kansas State Agriculture College (now called Kansas State University) when Sousa brought his band to Manhattan, Kansas in 1928. The piece was completed and then dedicated to the college in 1930. The piano score arrived at the college in 1931 and has become an integral part of Kansas State Wildcats football games and lore.

After Sousa's death, the score was one of many that became accidentally mixed with other writings by Sousa which resulted in decades of confusion about his final works. Years of sorting and review of over 9,000 pages of his work were assembled and reviewed by multiple music librarians including staff from the Library of Congress.

Over the years, the march has been performed outside of Kansas State events to showcase the works of Sousa.

== See also ==
- List of marches by John Philip Sousa
