= Stephen Bulla =

American army composer (born 1953)

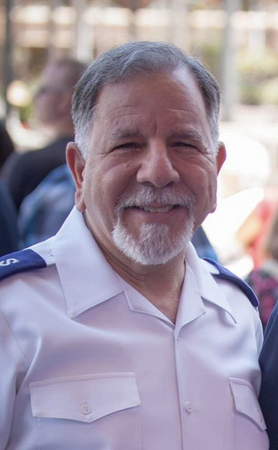
- Bulla in Salvation Army uniform, 2015

Background information
- Born: January 30, 1953 (age 73)
- Genres: Marches; Brass band; Jazz; contemporary classical music
- Occupations: Composer; conductor; pianist
- Instruments: Piano, trombone
- Years active: 1980–present

Stephen Bulla is an American composer and musician best known compositions for the United States Marine Band and The Salvation Army.

== Early life and education ==
Stephen Bulla attended music camps as a youth, including The Salvation Army camp Star Lake in Bloomingdale, New Jersey. Bulla graduated in 1976 from Berklee College of Music with a degree in music composition.

== Career ==
After his graduation in 1976, Bulla worked as a freelance writer in New York City. In 1980, Bulla became a staff arranger for The President's Own Marine Corps Band in Washington, DC, and then later chief arranger. Bulla held this position until 2010, composing music for the Marine band, which performed at White House events, including presidential inaugurations, state funerals, and state visits. Upon Bulla's retirement from the Marine band, John Williams cited him as "one of the most accomplished musicians of his generation."

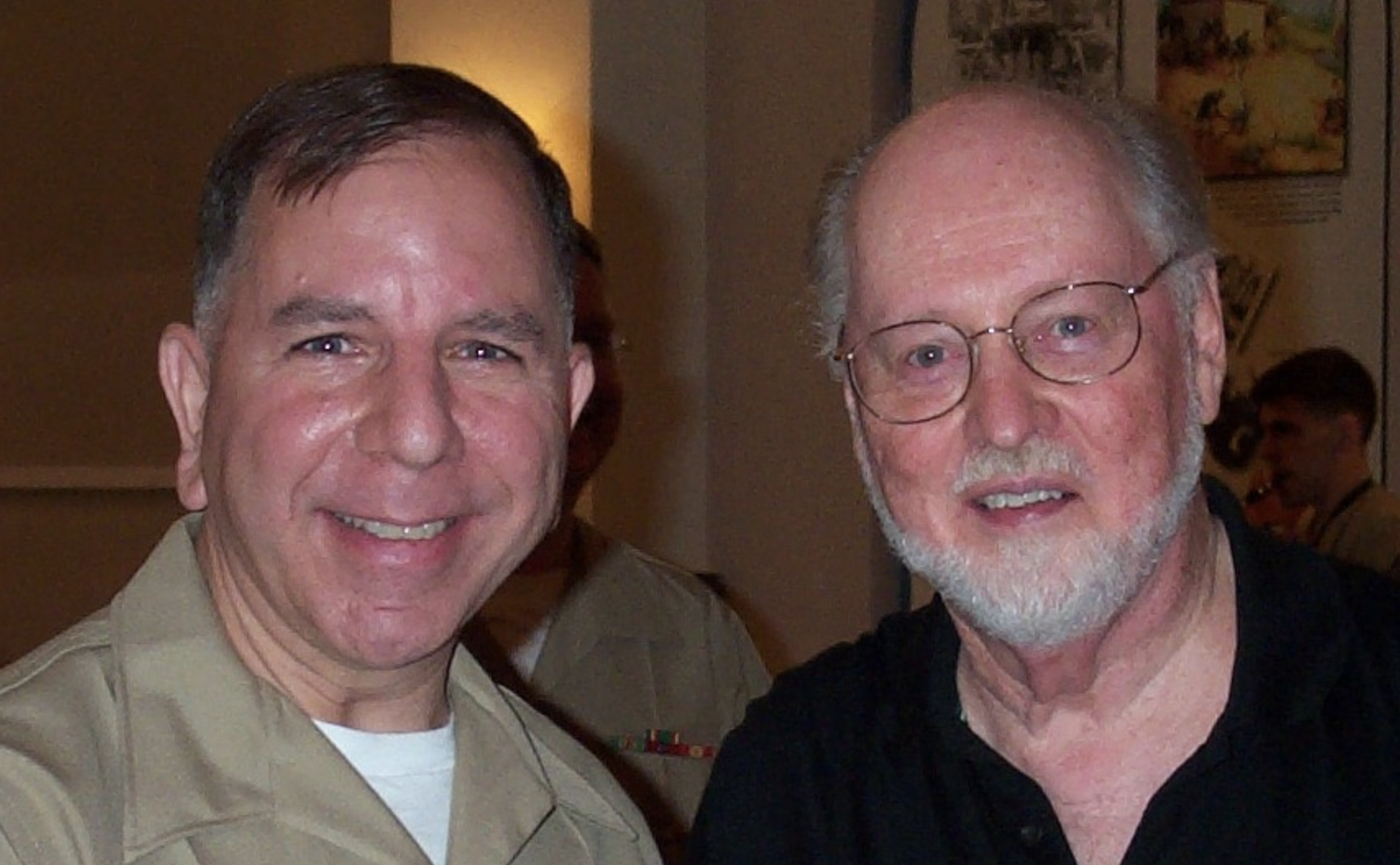
Stephen Bulla (left) and John Williams.

In 2003, the Library of Congress commissioned Bulla to complete the final march of John Philip Sousa, the Library of Congress March. Sousa died in 1932 before the march's completion. Bulla completed the composition.

Bulla composed musical scores for the Discovery Channel for NASA documentaries, and for the PBS series In Performance at the White House. Bulla has written many pieces exclusively for The Salvation Army, including the New York Staff Band. Bulla conducted the National Capital Band of The Salvation Army for fifteen years, and thirteen years as music director of New England Brass Band and Brass Of The Potomac. Bulla also participated in a trombone-only ensemble, "Spiritual to the 'Bone."

== Awards ==
| Year | Award | Category | Nominated work | Result |
|---|---|---|---|---|
| 1990 | Addy Award | Best original music for a TV spot | Advertisement compositions and documentaries | Won |
