= Semper Fidelis (march) =

1888 march by John Philip Sousa

- March by John Philip Sousa
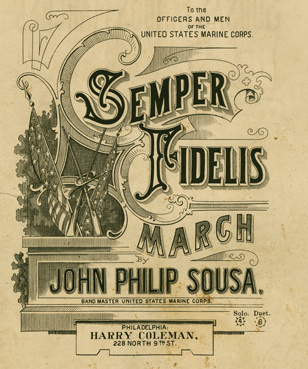
- English: Always faithful
- Year: 1888
- Dedication: Officers and men of the United States Marine Corps

"Semper Fidelis", written in 1888 by John Philip Sousa, is regarded as the official march of the United States Marine Corps. This piece was one of two composed in response to a request from United States President Chester A. Arthur for a new piece to be associated with the United States President. The words semper fidelis are Latin for "always faithful." The piece was created for a concert band including a percussion section. There is a very prominent drum solo in the middle of the piece which includes a skillful dynamic change. It features staccato notes and sharp tonguing.

== History ==
There does not exist an original general order documenting the proclamation of "Semper Fidelis" as the official march of the Marines. According to accounts summarized in the CD liner notes, Sousa is regarded by historians as honest and on many occasions noted that the march was named the official march of the Marine Corps. However, a flood destroyed many Marine Corps records, even those documenting Sousa's rank as leader of the United States Marine Corps Band; an order designating it as an official march could have been lost. The United States Marine Corps website refers to the song as "the Official March of the Marine Corps".

Sousa began as the musical conductor of the United States Marine Corps Band, known as "The President's Own", in 1880 and led the Band for five presidential administrations. President Arthur felt that "Hail to the Chief" was undignified and requested a new presidential composition. Sousa began performing "Presidential Polonaise" (1886) and later "Semper Fidelis", although Arthur predeceased the latter. Neither displaced "Hail to the Chief" as the song most closely associated with the United States President.

In an October 1927 interview published in the Independent (Nebraska), Sousa claimed "I wrote 'Semper Fidelis' one night while in tears after my comrades of the Marine Corps had sung their famous Hymn at Quantico (which is now home to Marine Corps Base Quantico)." However, no Marines were stationed at Quantico until May 14, 1917 and he wrote the song in 1888. This could be explained by a misquote or by Marine maneuvers or exercises at Quantico.

== Instrumentation ==
- 2 flutes
- piccolo
- 2 oboes
- cor anglais
- 2 clarinets
- 2 bassoons
- 4 horns
- 2 trumpets
- 3 trombones
- tuba
- timpani
- bass drum
- snare drum
- violins I and II
- violas
- cellos
- double basses

== See also ==
1909 recording of Semper Fidelis

- List of marches by John Philip Sousa
