= Liberty Loan March =

1917 song by John Philip Sousa

Instrumental
- Written: 1917
- Genre: March
- Composer: John Philip Sousa

"Liberty Loan March" is a World War I era song composed by John Philip Sousa. The song had been written for the Liberty Loan Drive, the first of which was held in April 1917. In these drives, Sousa's march was played and participants walked in time to the music. A recording of this song was released in 1917 by Victor Records. The song was popularly performed by Sousa's Band. It reached number three on the US song charts in March 1918.
