= Almas Temple =

Masonic building in Washington, D.C.

Coordinates: 38.902940°N 77.03051°W

The temple's façade

The Almas Temple is a Masonic building facing Franklin Square at 1315 K St NW in Washington, D.C. It houses Almas Shrine, a sub-group for Shriner's International whose headquarters is located in Tampa, Florida. The edifice is in the Moorish architectural style and features an elaborate, multicolored terra-cotta façade. It was constructed in 1929 by Allen H. Potts, a member of the temple.

The building is five stories in height. It was renovated and relocated about 100 feet westward to its current location in 1987 to make way for a new office complex, One Franklin Square.

== In literature ==
The Almas Temple is one of the settings in Dan Brown's 2009 novel, The Lost Symbol.
