= Paul E. Bierley =

American music historian

- Born: Paul Edmund Bierley; February 3, 1926; Portsmouth, Ohio, U.S.
- Died: April 9, 2016 (aged 90); Ohio, U.S.
- Occupation: Music historian
- Spouse: Pauline (m. 1948)
- Children: 2
- Parents: William Bierley (father); Minnie Bierley (mother)

Paul Edmund Bierley (February 3, 1926 – April 9, 2016) was an American music historian. Among his awards were a Society for American Music Lifetime Achievement Award and receiving an Honorary Doctor of Music from Ohio State University.

== Career ==
During World War II era, he was a B-25 bomber radio operator and gunner for the Army Air Forces and served in the United States. He was stationed at Westover Air Force Base and played in the Army Air Forces band. He married Pauline in 1948. He graduated with a degree in aeronautical engineering from Ohio State University in 1953, and worked for North American Aviation and Ellanef Manufacturing.

Bierley later began an active musical career. He conducted extensive research on John Philip Sousa and wrote books about him, Henry Fillmore, and historical books about music. He wrote liner notes for album and CDs and magazine articles. He portrayed Uncle Sam at band concerts and lectured on musical subjects. Bierley founded Integrity Research Foundation and Integrity Press.

He had relationships with local music organizations like Brass Band of Columbus, Columbus Symphony Orchestra, Detroit Concert Band, Wheeling Steel Band of Portsmouth, Ohio Village Brass, the Virginia Grand Military Band, as well as the North American Aviation Concert Band, the New Sousa Band, and the World Symphony Orchestra. He was a member of the Tubists Universal Brotherhood Association and the International Tuba and Euphonium Society.

Among his awards were a Society of American Music Lifetime Achievement Award and receiving an Honorary Doctor of Music from Ohio State University.

== Personal life ==
Paul Edmund Bierley, the son of William and Minnie Bierley, was born in 1926 in Portsmouth, Ohio. He married Pauline in 1948, with whom they had son John and daughter Lois. He lived much of his married life in Westerville, Ohio. Pauline died before Bierley, who died on April 9, 2016. His remains were donated to the Ohio State University College of Medicine.

== Bibliography ==
His notable books are:

- John Philip Sousa: American Phenomenon (1973); OCLC 677260, 47639367
- The Music of Henry Fillmore and Will Huff (1982); OCLC 924740409
- The Heritage Encyclopedia of Band Music, Composers and their music (2 Vol.s), by William Harold Rehrig (born 1939), Paul Bierley (1991); OCLC 477210625
- Marching Along: Recollections of Men, Women and Music (1994); OCLC 924740436
- The Incredible Band of John Philip Sousa (2010); OCLC 968661395
- New England Families, Genealogical and Memorial
