= Francis M. Scala =

Italian-born American military band leader

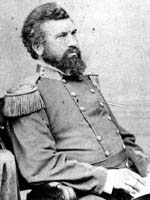
- Scala in the uniform of a U.S. Marine
- Born: Francesco Maria Scala c. 1819; Naples, Kingdom of the Two Sicilies
- Died: April 18, 1903 (aged 84); Washington, D.C., U.S.
- Burial place: Congressional Cemetery, Washington
- Military career
- Allegiance: United States of America
- Branch: United States Marine Corps
- Service years: 1842–1871 (U.S. Marines); 1841–1842 (U.S. Navy)
- Rank: Major
- Nickname: "Francis"
- Commands: USMC Band ("The President's Own")

Francesco Maria Scala (c. 1819 – 18 April 1903) also known as Francis M. Scala, was an Italian-born naturalized American military band director and musician. He was the first and one of the most important and influential directors of the United States Marine Band. He defined the instrumental organization that the band maintains, he was an extremely prolific musician and composer, and improved and enlarged the repertoire of the ensemble. It is thought that under his direction the USMC Band executed for the first time "The Gendarmes' Duet" from Act II of the revision in 1867 of the Jacques Offenbach opera Geneviève de Brabant, which debuted in Paris in 1859. This melody is now known as the Marines' Hymn.

== Biography ==
Scala was born in Naples around 1819. Although his family had no musical traditions, he precociously developed a strong passion for music. He was admitted as a student at the San Pietro a Maiella Conservatory in Naples, where he graduated as a clarinet soloist.

In 1841, according to his own words "at the age of about twenty", he embarked as a "third-class musician" on the US frigate USS Brandywine, of the Mediterranean Squadron.

He soon discovered he suffered from sea sickness, therefore he resigned from the US Navy and on August 11, 1842, he joined the USMC Band in Washington. His capabilities were soon appreciated, and he was promoted to "Fife Major" on May 22, 1843.

On September 9, 1855, he succeeded Rafael Triay as the 14th band director, or Drum Major. Before Scala, twelve other musicians served as band leaders from the foundation of the US Marine Band in 1798; among these were two other Italians: Venerando Pulizzi (served 1816–17; 1818–27) and Joseph Lucchesi (1844–46). Scala was, however, the first musician officially bestowed with the title of Band Director, by a decree issued on July 25, 1861. After him, there was only one other Italian Band Director, Francesco Fanciulli (between 1892 and 1897).

During his sixteen-year tenure, Scala decided the instrumental configuration that the band maintains. He increased the dimension of the band from the ten elements he found when taking leadership, to about 35 when he retired. He also took the far-sighted decision to maintain an equal relationship between woodwind and brass, in a period when brass were predominate in the bands.

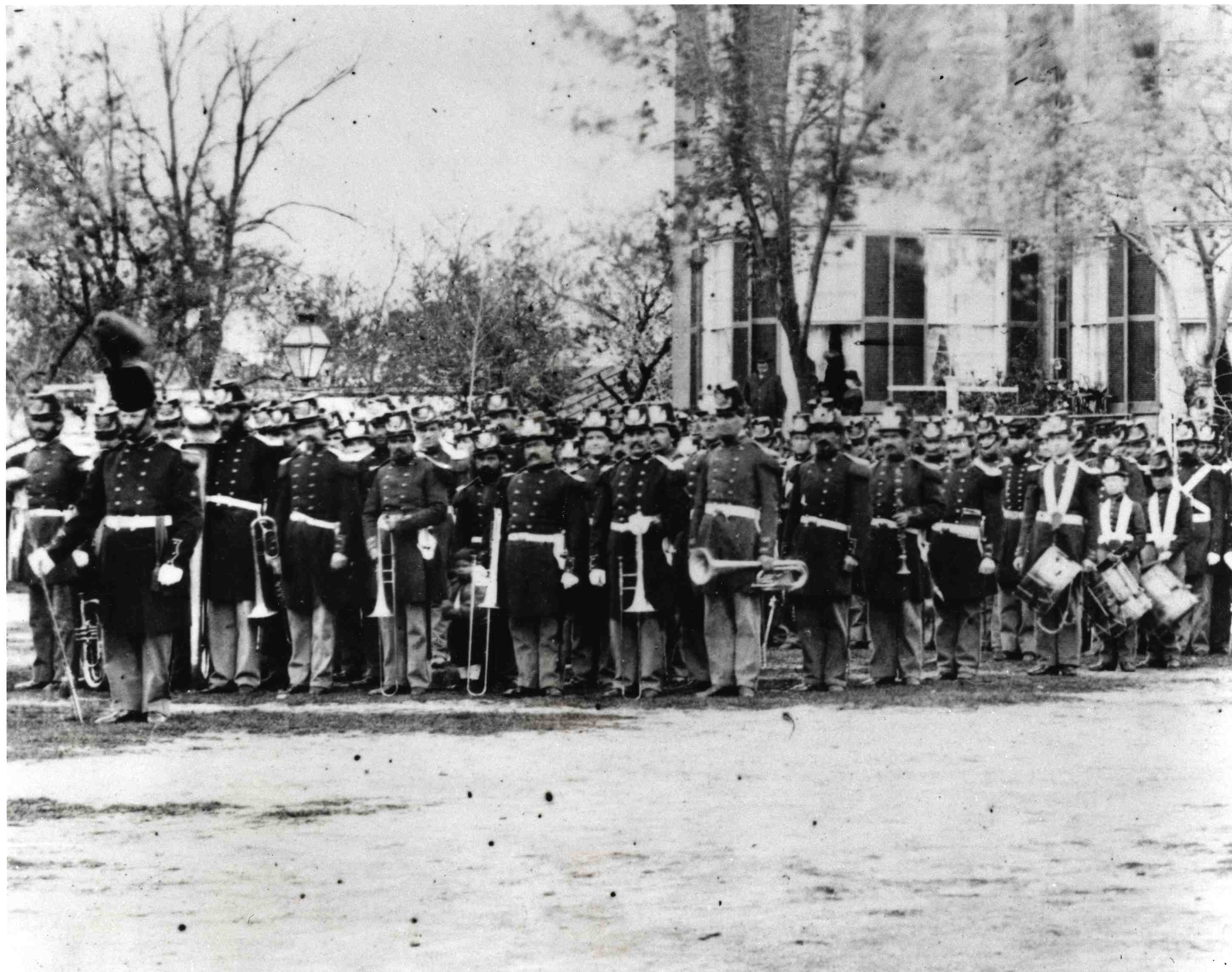
The Marine Band led by Francesco Maria Scala (1864)

As with all the Marine Band directors, Scala maintained a very strict relationship with the various American Presidents, that the Band accompanied during their official visits. Scala became Band Director during President Buchanan's term in office. Scala directed the band during the American Civil War, during which he developed a very strict and strong relationship with President Abraham Lincoln, to which he had already dedicated a special concert in his honor the same night of his election. During the Civil War, President Lincoln directed that the Marine Band continue to regularly offer its concerts in the front lawn of the White House. (When President Lincoln's son died, the concerts were moved to Lafayette Square as a sign of respect.) Scala was with Lincoln in Gettysburg on November 19, 1863, for the inauguration of the National Cemetery, when Lincoln delivered his famous address, and he was with him on the White House lawn on April 9, 1865, when the news about the surrounding of the Confederate Army arrived. At Lincoln's request, the band played the tune "Dixie" (associated with the Confederacy), because – as the President said from his balcony – "now it is of the Nation's". Eleven days later, the band expressed the country's mourning, while accompanying Lincoln's coffin during his funeral.

Scala was an extremely prolific musician and arranger, and he improved and enlarged the repertoire of the ensemble. Applying his training and experience in European classical music and Italian opera, he guided the Marine Band toward a more concertistic approach, as opposed to solely military, parade and pomp services. Under the direction of Scala, the young John Philip Sousa started his own apprenticeship in the Band (where his father already played) on June 9, 1868.

Scala ended his term as Marine Band director on December 13, 1871. He lived the rest of his life in Washington, D.C., in his house on South Carolina Avenue. When he died on April 18, 1903, the Marine Band played his preferred hymn Nearer My God to Thee during his funerals from his house and the Catholic church of St. Peter, and while in the church, it played the arrangement written by Scala for the funeral tune from Il Trovatore by Giuseppe Verdi.

Scala's music collection is conserved at the Library of Congress in Washington, D.C., to which it was donated in 1952 by his son, together with a fund that covers expenses for its study and execution. The collection includes more than 600 titles: original works (marches, waltz, etc.) and transcriptions and arrangements from the operatic repertoire, particularly from the Italian composers Giuseppe Verdi and Gioacchino Rossini.

== Bibliography ==
- Clark, Allen C. "Francis Maria Scala: A Leader of the Band, U.S. Marine Corps." Unpublished transcript of a paper read before the Columbia Historical Society. 21 March 1933. Washington, D.C. U.S. Marine Band Archives.
- "Congressional Cemetery." Pamphlet published by Congressional Cemetery Association (1801 E Street, SE) Washington, D.C.
- Della Fonte, Lorenzo "L'infinita musica del vento", ed. Casa Musicale Eco, 2014 (novel)
- "Francis Scala, Director of Famous Marine Band for Thirty Years." The Morning Times (Washington), 26 April 1903.
- Ingalls, David M. Francis Scala: Leader of the Marine Band from 1855 to 1871. M.A. Dissertation, Catholic University of America, 1957.
- Kirk, Elise K. Music at the White House. Urbana: University of Illinois Press, 1986.
- "Scala’s Glorious Past." Undated newspaper clipping. Washington, D.C. U.S. Marine Band Archives.
- Washington, D.C. U.S. Marine Band Archives.
