= John Philip Sousa Baton =

Conducting baton

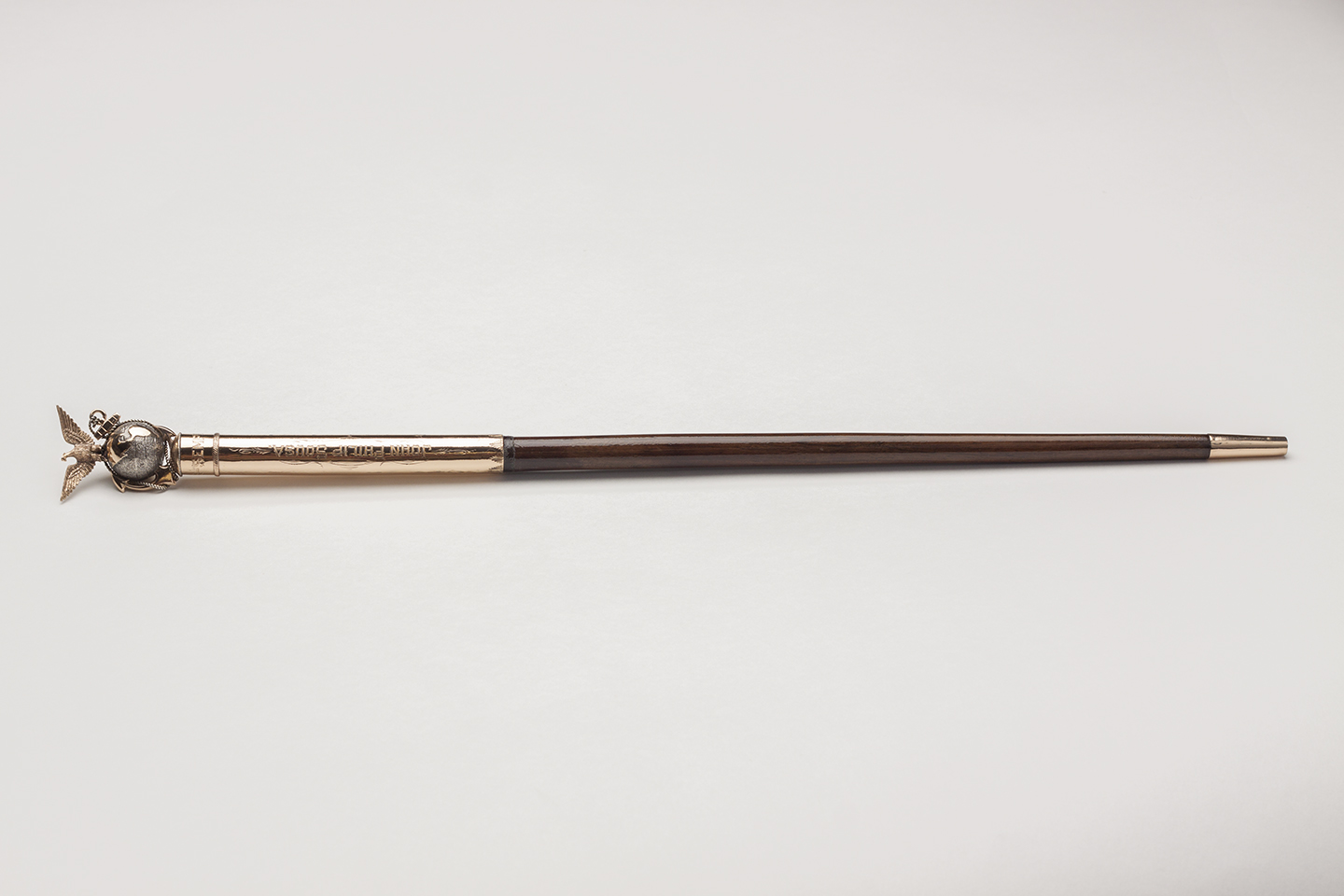
John Philip Sousa Baton

The John Philip Sousa Baton is a conducting baton originally presented to John Philip Sousa upon his resignation as the director of the United States Marine Band. After his death, it was donated to the Marine Band, and since it has been traditionally passed to the new director from the outgoing director of the band during the change of command ceremonies.

== Description ==
The John Philip Sousa Baton is 17.15-inch (43.6 cm) wooden conducting baton, capped with a silver engraving depicting the United States Marine Corps' Eagle, Globe, and Anchor emblem and finished in silver at the opposite end. Along the side of the bottom is engraved the words "John Philip Sousa—presented by members of the U.S. Marine Band as a token of their respect and esteem. July 29, 1892."

== History ==
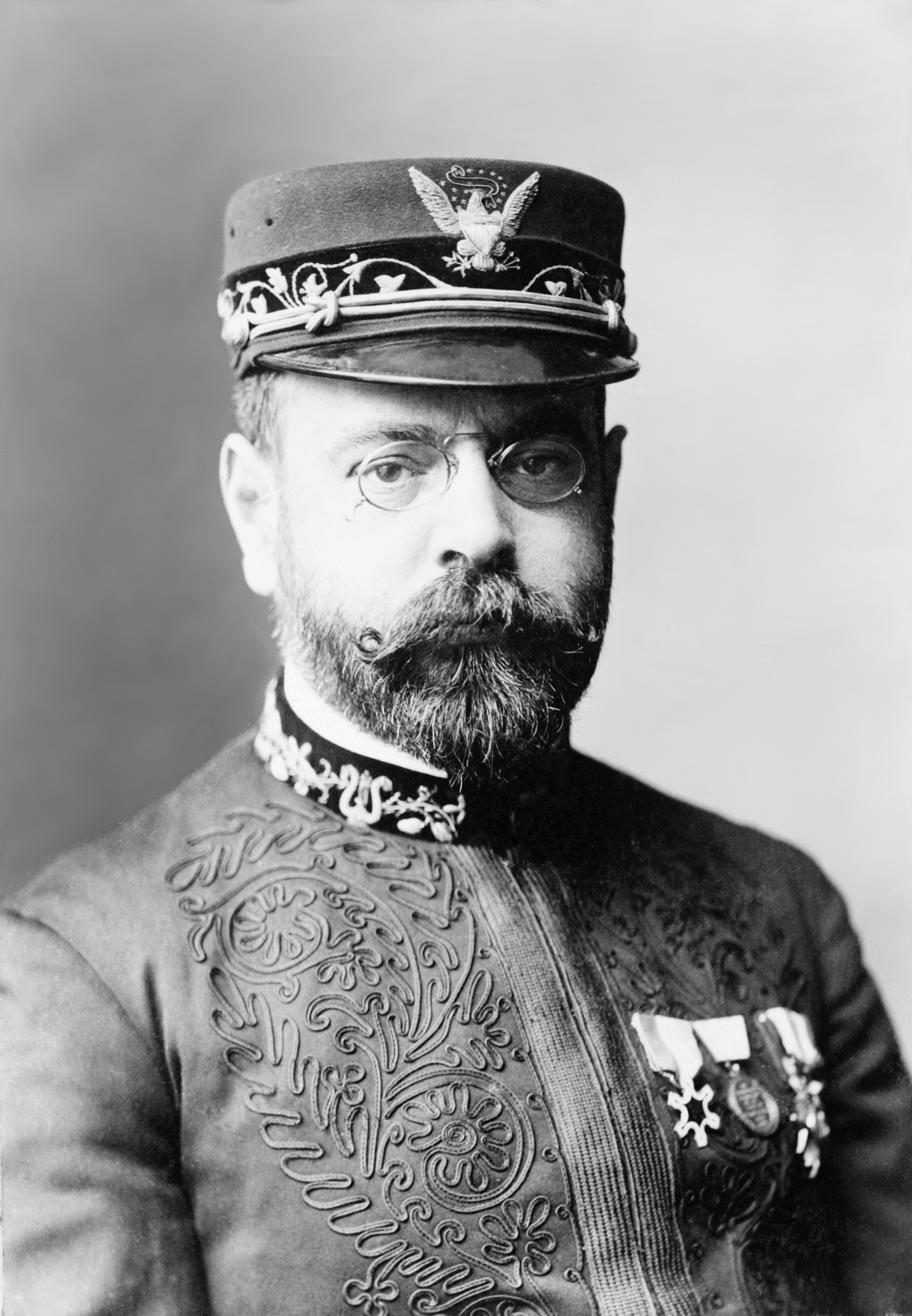
John Philip Sousa

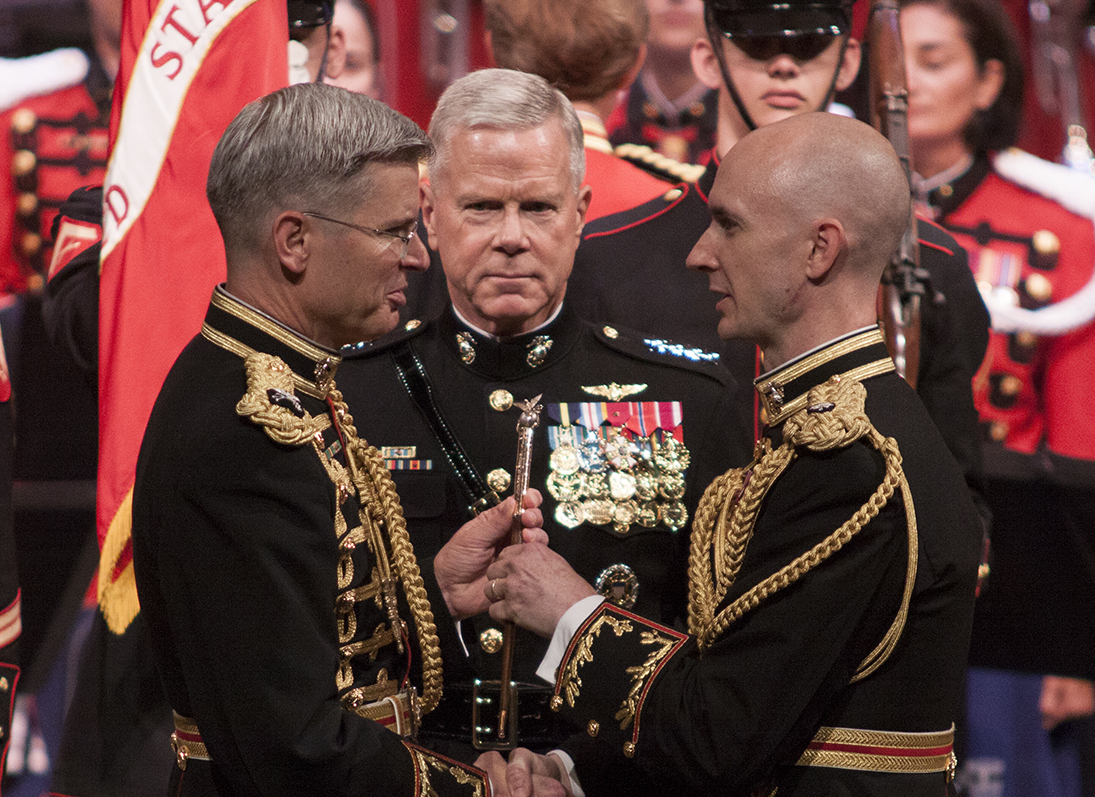
General James F. Amos (center) observes the transfer of the baton from Michael J. Colburn (left) to Jason Fettig (right) in 2014

Historian Paul E. Bierley describes that John Philip Sousa molded the United States Marine Band into "the finest military band in the world". In 1892, however, Sousa announced his resignation following his twelve years of service as the director of the Marine Band. He wanted to organize his own band, which he later called "Sousa's Band". On July 29, Sousa directed the band in a penultimate concert at the National Theater. Vice President Levi P. Morton and Speaker of the House of Representatives Charles Frederick Crisp were among the dignitaries in attendance.

The next day, Sousa led the band in its final performance under his leadership at the White House for President Benjamin Harrison, following which he was officially discharged from service. The last piece Sousa conducted while leader of the Marine Band was "Hail, Columbia". At the White House lawn, he was presented with the baton as token of the respect and esteem of the bandsmen. The presentation was made by Walter F. Smith, a member of the Marine Band who was resigning with Sousa to join his new band. Sousa died in 1932, and in 1953, his daughters Jane and Helen Sousa donated the baton to the United States Marine Band. Since, the baton has been traditionally passed to the new director from the outgoing director of the band during change of command ceremonies. It is otherwise held at the National Museum of the Marine Corps.

The baton figures in the plot of the 2011 juvenile novel by Martha Freeman, The Case of the Rock 'n Roll Dog. According to Kirkus Reviews, the book centers on a "concert [that] is jeopardized when, among other items, the John Philip Sousa baton used by the Marine Corps Band goes missing."

== See also ==
- List of marches by John Philip Sousa
- John Philip Sousa Bridge
