= United States Marine Band =

Premier band of the US Marine Corps

"The President's Own" United States Marine Band
- The United States Marine Band at the White House in June 2024
- Founded: 11 July 1798
- Allegiance: United States
- Branch: United States Marine Corps
- Type: Military band
- Size: 160
- Garrison/HQ: Marine Barracks, Washington, D.C.
- Nickname: "The President's Own"
- March: "Marines' Hymn" (official hymn) "Semper Fidelis" (official march)
- Website: www.marineband.marines.mil

Commanders
- Director: Lieutenant Colonel Ryan J. Nowlin
- Associate Director: Captain Darren Y. Lin
- Assistant Director: Captain Jose D. Toranzo
- Director Of Operations: Lieutenant Colonel Douglas R. Burian
- Deputy Director for Administration and Production: Chief Warrant Officer 3 Sara Sheffield
- Drum Major: Master Gunnery Sergeant Steven F. Williams
- Assistant Drum Major: Gunnery Sergeant Tyler D. Limbrock
- Notable commanders: John Philip Sousa; Colonel Michael J. Colburn; Colonel Jason K. Fettig

Insignia
- Logo

The United States Marine Band is the premier band of the United States Marine Corps. Established by act of Congress on 11 July 1798, it is the oldest of the United States military bands and the oldest professional musical organization in the United States. Today, the Marine Band includes the Marine Chamber Orchestra and Marine Chamber Ensembles.

The Marine Band is entirely separate from its sister military band, the United States Marine Drum and Bugle Corps ("The Commandant's Own") and the 10 active duty Marine Corps field bands.

The Marine Band has been uniquely known as "The President's Own" since 1801 due to its historical connection to the President of the United States. The relationship between the Marine Band and the White House began on New Year's Day 1801 when President John Adams invited the band to perform at the Executive Mansion. Later that year, Thomas Jefferson initiated the tradition of Marine Band performances by requesting that it perform at his inauguration. The Marine Band has played at every United States presidential inauguration since. President Thomas Jefferson gave it the title "The President's Own" in 1801. This terminology emulated a long-established British usage, where various military units were designated as "King's Own" or "Queen's Own".

Today, the Marine Band performs in about 500 events every year including state funerals, state arrival ceremonies, state dinners, parades, concerts, and other social events. The Marine Band travels across the country each October and November during its fall concert tour, a tradition that began in 1891 under its most famous director, composer John Philip Sousa.

== Members and organization ==
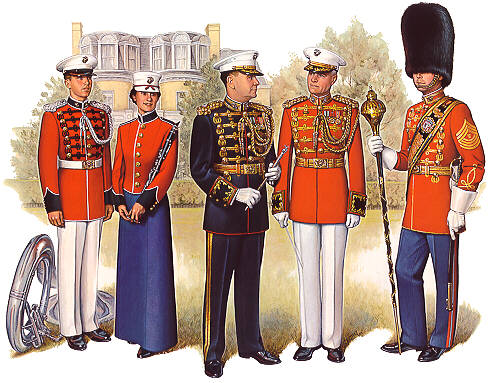
United States Marine Band uniforms

The Marine Band recruits experienced musicians, selecting members through a rigorous audition procedure. Members must satisfy additional security and physical requirements to be eligible. Selected band members serve under a four-year contract as active duty enlisted Marines and are subject to the Uniform Code of Military Justice and physical standards. Members of The President's Own and the United States Coast Guard Band are the only members of the United States Armed Forces not required to undergo recruit training and do not perform combat missions. Also, they are not assigned to any unit other than the Marine Band. Musicians of other Marine bands must attend boot camp and Marine Combat Training (MCT).

The 'President's Own' band members wear rank insignia with a lyre replacing the standard crossed rifles. Commissioned officers are often drawn from within the band. However, auditions are open to members of all Marine Corps bands. Drum majors are career Marines and are selected from the Marine Corps field bands, as they are responsible for the military development of the band's members. As of 2010, the USMC spends about $10 million annually to support the band.

In 2005, Sara Sheffield became the first female feature vocalist in the band's history.

== Performances ==
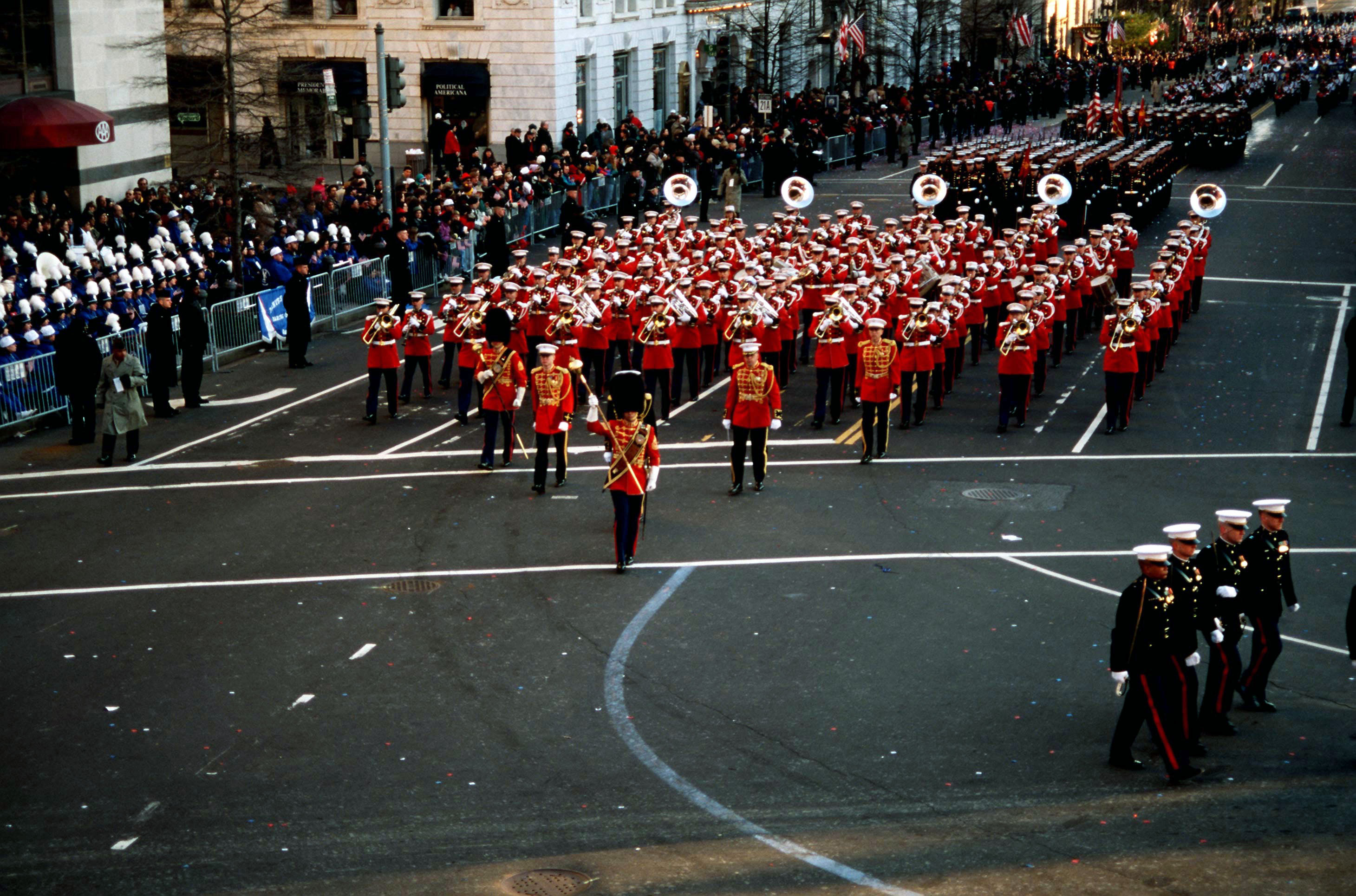
The Marine Band marching down 15th Street during an inaugural parade held in honor of President Bill Clinton on 20 January 1997

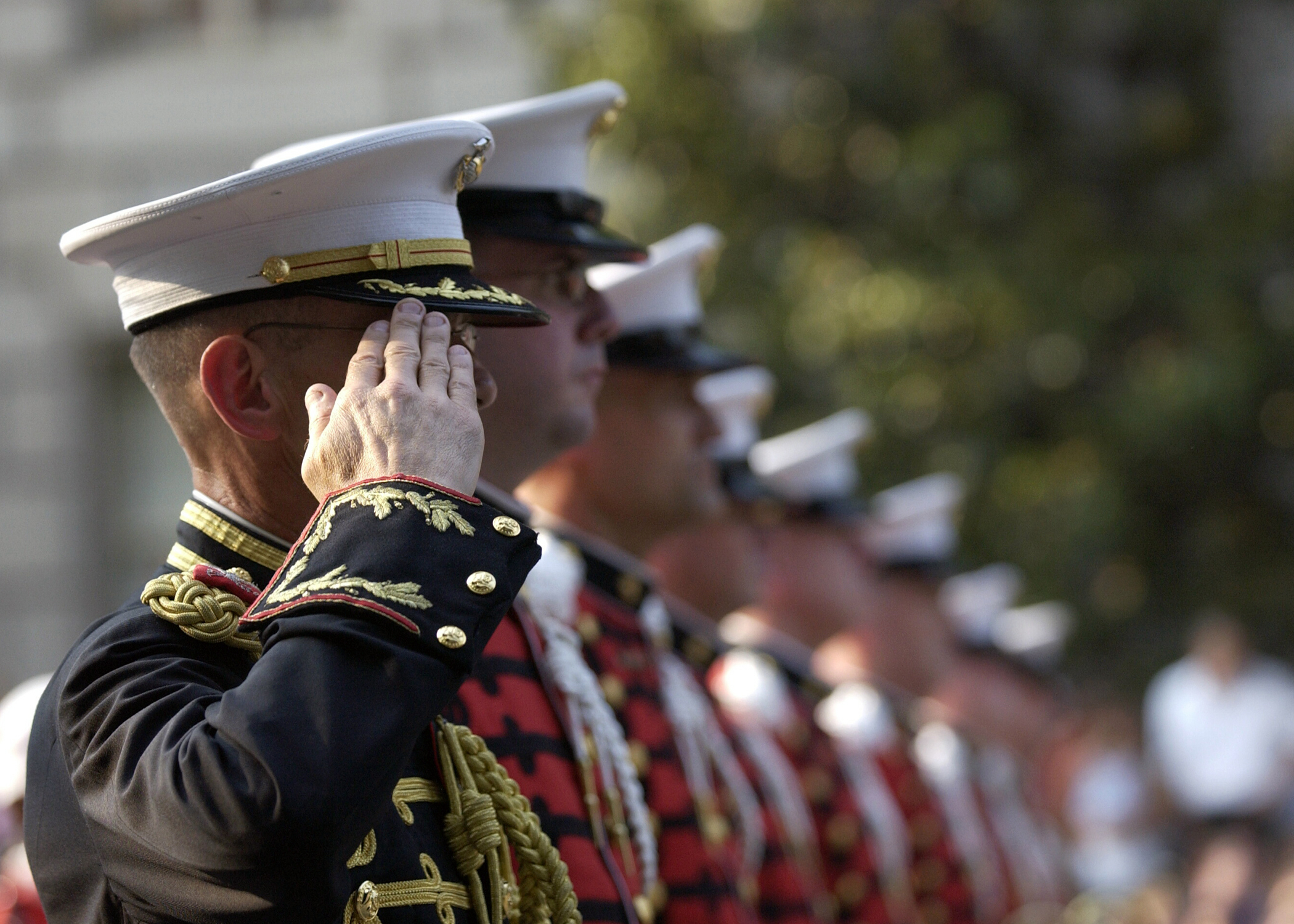
Members of the Marine Band escorting the remains of President Ronald Reagan to the Capitol Rotunda during his state funeral held in June 2004

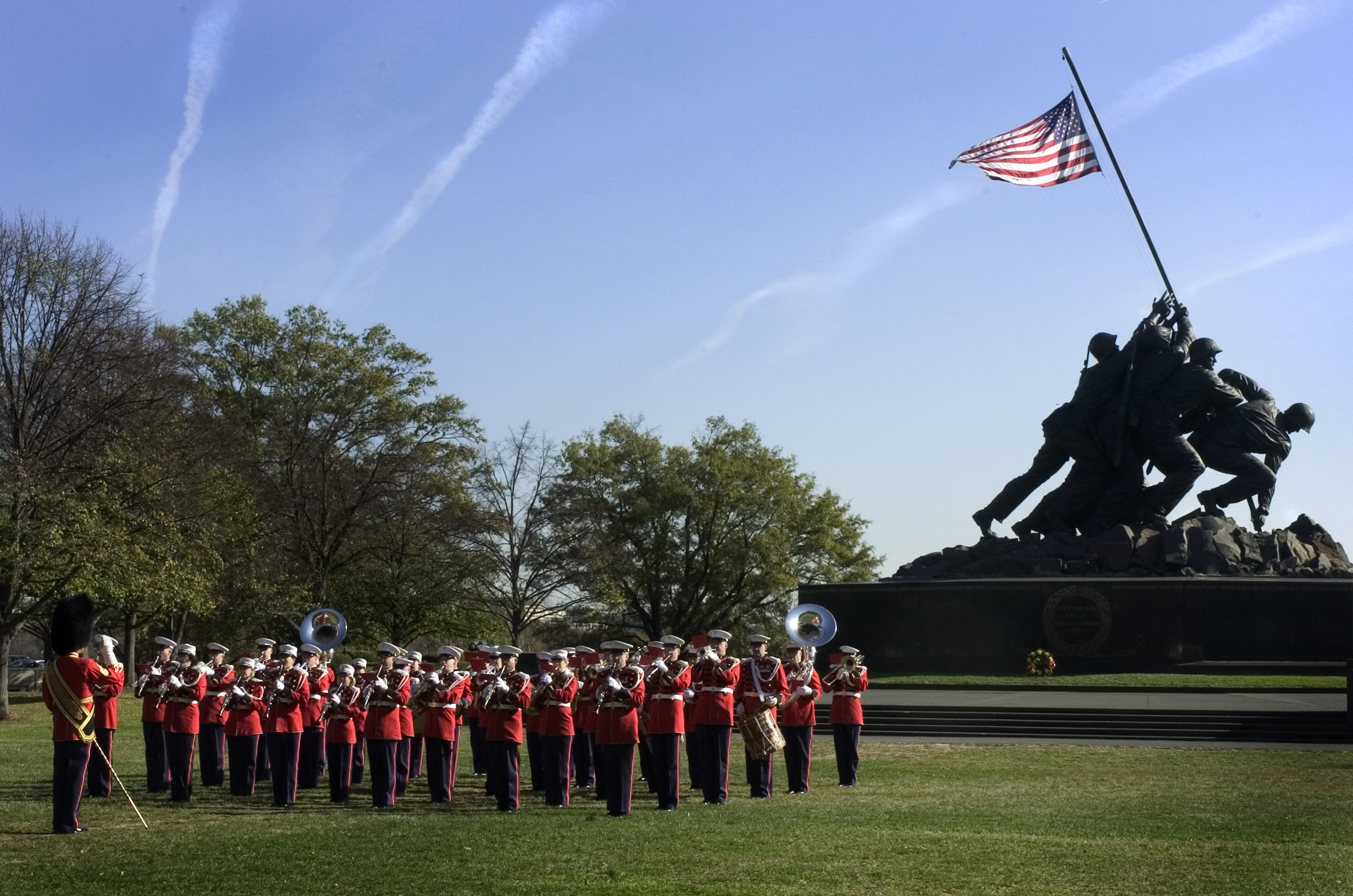
The Marine Band performing for an audience attending a wreath laying ceremony honoring the United States Marine Corps' 229th birthday at the Marine Corps War Memorial

The Marine Band's performance schedule is coordinated by the Marine Band Branch of Headquarters Marine Corps Public Affairs, which works with the director of the Marine Band and the Marine Band Operations Office to schedule performances and ceremonies by the band, chamber orchestra, and chamber ensembles.

The Marine Band also has a professional support staff (Library, Recording Lab, Stage Managers, and Stage Crew) and Administration, Public Affairs, and Supply offices. They work to coordinate, promote, and facilitate performances throughout the year.

The full band has a complement of about 130 members, although they all play together only rarely.

A 42-piece band is used for all Pentagon and formal military arrivals and patriotic openers for significant events. Patriotic openers are 15 minutes of patriotic music, including the presentation and retirement of the colors, "The Star-Spangled Banner" (national anthem), and the "Marines' Hymn". Patriotic openers are performed throughout the Washington metropolitan area at various events for military organizations, federal agencies, and associations.

Events that the Marine Band participates in include:

- United States presidential inaugurations. The Marine Band has participated in every presidential inauguration since Thomas Jefferson's in 1801. The Marine Band is positioned at the United States Capitol for the swearing-in ceremony, and a 99-piece band marches in the inaugural parade back to the White House. The band also performs for celebrations following the official ceremony and parade. Celebrations are typically divided by state and held at hotels and in large public spaces throughout Washington D.C.
- State funerals. The Military District of Washington Commander of Troops arranges the ceremonial preparations and, for the funeral, supervises the procession to the Washington National Cathedral in Northwest D.C. The Secretary of Defense conducts the funeral proceedings. A traditional component of the state funeral is a procession composed of National Guard, active-duty, academy, and reserve personnel that represent the five branches of the United States armed forces. A 99-piece band provides traditional music during each phase of the state funeral, often with other military bands. Previous funeral processions in the nation's capital have honored ten presidents.
- State Arrival Ceremonies. The Marine Band performs during a State Arrival Ceremony at the White House, an event which welcomes a visiting head of state to the United States and begins a state visit. The United States Marine Band is located on the balcony of the South Portico, just outside the Blue Room. Following the ceremony, the Marine Band performs in the Cross Hall during the receiving line and reception.
- Arlington National Cemetery military funerals. The Marine Band participates in every full honors military funeral for a deceased Marine at Arlington National Cemetery. During the funeral ceremony, the Marine Band performs chorales and hymns every occasion the deceased is transferred or moved. When the escorts and funeral procession moves the deceased from a chapel or transfer site to the final resting place, a drum cadence and funeral marches are performed. "Marines' Hymn" is performed for the final transfer of the deceased onto the resting site. Following this, the deceased receives final honors and three volley salute, and a lone bugler from the Marine Band performs "Taps". After the funeral ceremony, an American flag is folded and presented to the family of the deceased, during which the Marine Band performs "Eternal Father, Strong to Save", the Navy hymn.
- Friday Evening Parades are held at Marine Barracks, Washington, D.C. during Friday evenings in summer (May through August). These 75-minute performances of music and precision marching feature the Marine Band along with the Drum and Bugle Corps and the Silent Drill Platoon. The ceremony begins at 8:45 pm, with a concert by the Marine Band.
- Other events. The Marine Band sometimes performs at additional events, such as state dinners and formal receptions at the White House, as well as performances at the National Sylvan Theater in Washington D.C. during the summer months.

== Leadership ==
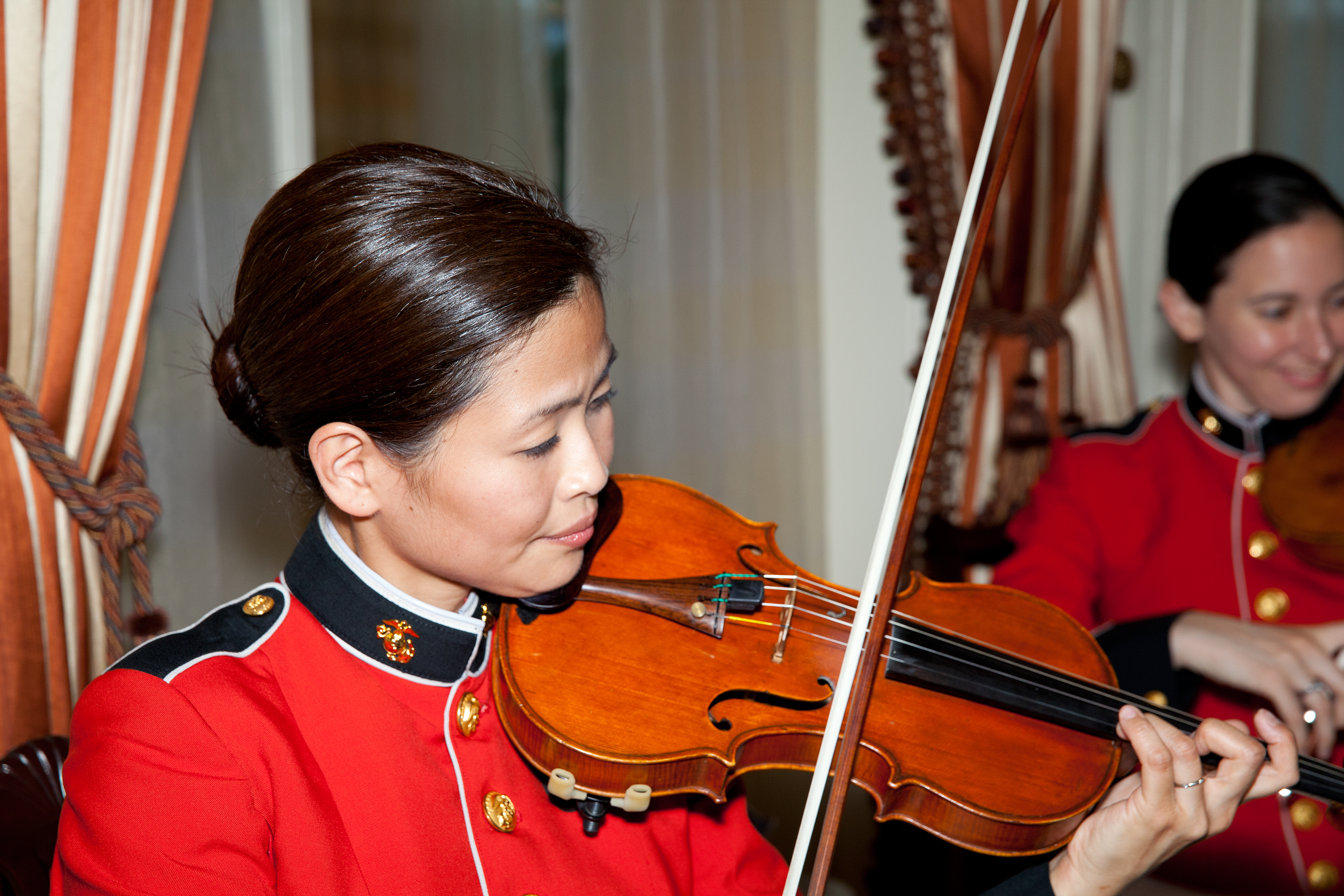
Violinist from the Marine Band performing during a reception at the residence of the Commandant of the Marine Corps on 19 July 2013

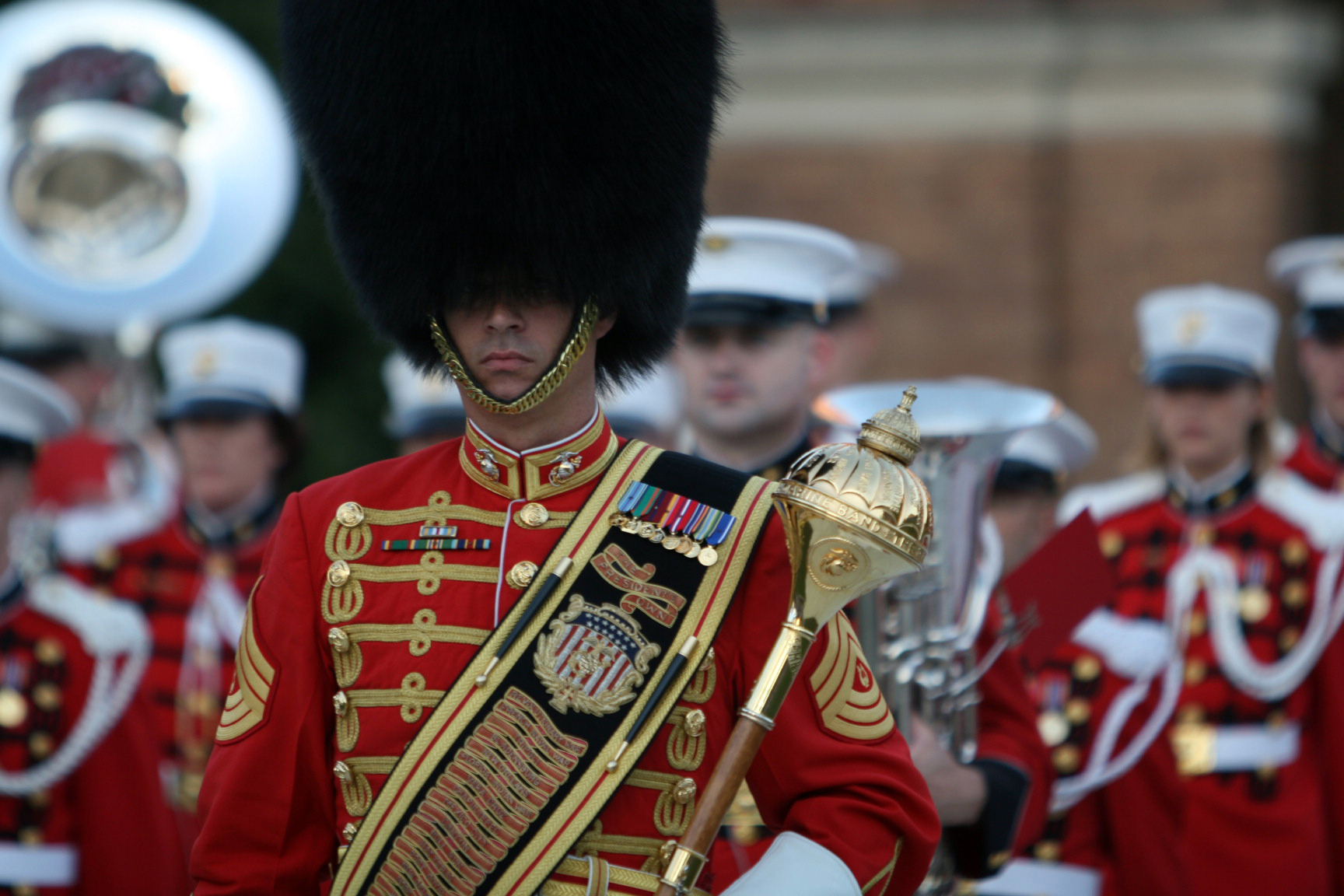
Drum Major of the United States Marine Band, Master Sergeant William L. Browne, wearing a bearskin cap and holding a ceremonial mace

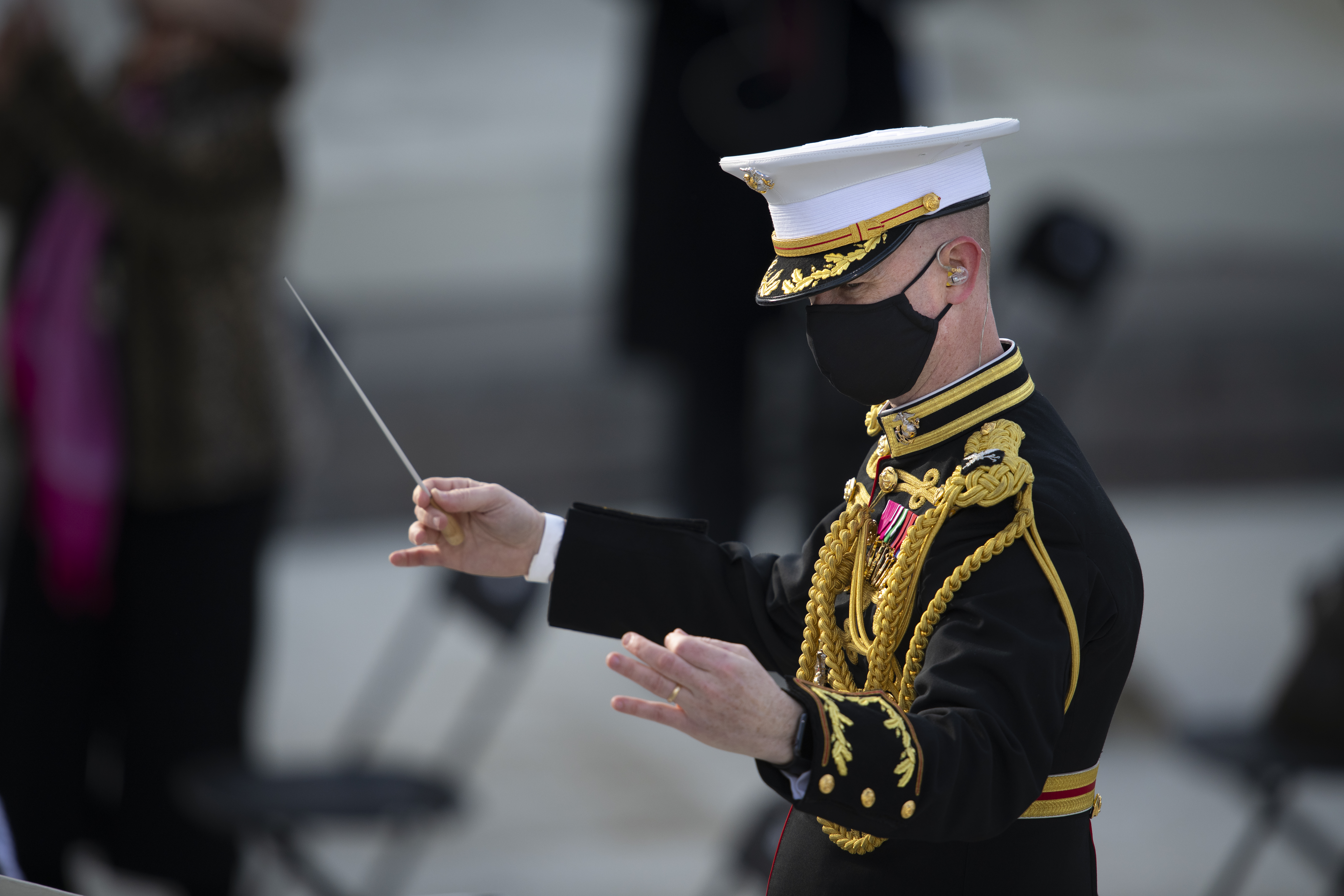
Jason Fettig during the inauguration of Joe Biden

The Marine Band's early leadership consisted of a drum major and a fife major, who wore identical uniforms. The drum major was considered the leader of the Marine Band, while the fife major's responsibility was to train the fifers. The first leader of the United States Marine Band was William Farr, listed in historical records as having served as drum major from 21 January 1799.

After the retirement of Drum Major Raphael Triay in 1855, then-fife major Francis Scala became drum major. On 25 July 1861, President Abraham Lincoln signed an Act of Congress to reorganize the Marine Band. This act abolished the rank of fife major (and in 1881, the fife was removed from Marine Corps instrumentation entirely), created the positions of leader of the band and principal musician, drum major, and authorized 30 musicians. Scala was the first Marine Band musician to receive the title "leader of the band"; John Roach was selected as drum major.

The earliest recorded second leader of the United States Marine Band was Salvador Petrola. Marine Band cornetist Walter F. Smith, who had performed under 17th director, John Philip Sousa, became the first official second leader when an Act of Congress established the positions of first leader and second leader of the Marine Band in March 1899.

Many changes occurred during the Dwight D. Eisenhower administration. The titles first leader and second leader were replaced by director and assistant director. When Albert F. Schoepper was appointed as director in 1955, a second assistant director was added to the Marine Band leadership. Today, the assistant director positions are designated in two titles: senior assistant director and executive officer, and assistant director. Also, the first "soloist and moderator" was appointed during the Eisenhower administration. William D. Jones, known as the original soloist with the new US Air Force Band and originator and director of the Singing Sergeants, was transferred by an Act of Congress to the USMC Band and given the title "ambassador of music". The soloist and moderator served as the senior enlisted member until 1972 when Schoepper and Jones retired.

Today, the drum major serves as the senior enlisted member of "The President's Own" and is responsible for the band's appearance, ceremonial drill, and military decorum. The drum major is charged with directing the band in ceremonies, including the inaugural parade, and regularly leads the band in review for presidents and visiting heads of state and other dignitaries.

The drum major wears a bearskin headpiece and carries a ceremonial mace used to signal commands to the musicians. The drum major also wears the officer's version of the Eagle, Globe, and Anchor (the Marine Corps emblem). The uniform also includes an ornate baldric, similar to a sash, embroidered with the band's crest and the Marine Corps' battle honors, as well as miniatures of personal medals.

=== People ===
Leaders:

- William Farr (1799–1804)
- Charles S. Ashworth (1804–1816)
- Venerando Pulizzi (1816–1817, 1818–1827)
- John Powley (1817–1818)
- John B. Cuvillier (1827–1829)
- Joseph Cuvillier (1829–1835)
- Francis Schenig (1835–1836)
- Raphael R. Triay (1836–1843)
- Antonio Pons (1843–1844)
- Joseph Lucchesi (1844–1846)
- Antonio Pons (1846–1848)
- Raphael R. Triay (1848–1855)
- Francis M. Scala (1855–1871)
- Henry Fries (1871–1873)
- Louis Schneider (1873–1880)
- John Philip Sousa (1880–1892)
- Francesco Fanciulli (1892–1897)
- William Henry Santelmann (1898–1927)
- Taylor Branson (1927–1940)
- William F. Santelmann (1940–1955)
- Albert F. Schoepper (1955–1972)
- Dale L. Harpham (1972–1974)
- Jack T. Kline (1974–1979)
- John R. Bourgeois (1979–1996)
- Timothy W. Foley (1996–2004)
- Michael J. Colburn (2004–2014)
- Jason K. Fettig (2014–2023)
- Ryan J. Nowlin (2023–2023)

Drum majors:

- John Roach (1861–1875)
- Richard T. Johnson (1875–1882)
- Edward D. Hughes (1882–1885)
- August Gaeckler (1886–1895)
- James Barton (1895–1897)
- Ruben Bradley (1897–1908)
- Reynold H. Nothbohm (1908–1910)
- James L. Culleton (1911)
- Hurshel D. Pryor (1911–1927)
- Hiram H. Florea (1927–1943)
- Elmer R. Hansen (1943–1949)
- Edmond DeMar (1949–1958)
- Henry L. Peters (1958–1964)
- Daniel M. Oeser (1964–1968)
- James R. Donovan (1968–1972)
- Charles R. Jimerson (1972–1974)
- Dennis E. Carroll (1974–1984)
- Gary A. Petersen (1984–1989)
- John D. Lee (1989–1994)
- Dennis R. Wolfe (1994–1999)
- John R. Barclay (1999–2001)
- Thomas D. Kohl (2001–2007)
- William L. Browne (2007–2014)
- Duane F. King (2014–2025)
- Steven Williams (2025-present)

== Composers ==
Sousa composed several marches, including Semper Fidelis, while serving as director of the Marine Band.

Thomas Powell Knox joined the Marine Band in 1961 as a trumpet player and moved to the arranging staff in 1966. Three years later, Knox was appointed chief arranger and continued composing and arranging for the Marine Band until his retirement in 1985. Some of his more notable compositions include "God of Our Fathers" (commissioned for Ronald Reagan's first inauguration) and "American Pageant", which was commissioned for Richard Nixon's first inauguration. Knox arranged or composed over 300 pieces, many of which the Marine Band and other bands across America still played.

== Music ==
Performances by the Marine Band

"Semper Fidelis" (1909)
John Philip Sousa's "Semper Fidelis March", the official march of the United States Marine Corps

"Semper Fidelis" (1989)

"The Washington Post"
Sousa's march "The Washington Post"

"King Cotton"
Sousa's march "King Cotton"

"Manhattan Beach
Sousa's march "Manhattan Beach"

"The Stars and Stripes Forever"
Sousa's march "The Stars and Stripes Forever"

"The Thunderer" (1896)
Sousa's march "The Thunderer"

Toccata, Adagio and Fugue in C, BWV 564
Composition by J. S. Bach

"Revelation" (1992)
W. Paris Chambers' march "Revelation"

"22nd Regiment March"
Patrick Gilmore's "22nd Regiment March"

"The Circus Bee"
Henry Fillmore's screamer "The Circus Bee"

"The White Cockade"
"The White Cockade", traditional fife and drum march

"Marines' Hymn"
"Marines' Hymn", official hymn of the Marine Corps

"Radetzky March"
Johann Strauss I's "Radetzky March"

From Die Walküre
Pastiche from Wagner's opera Die Walküre

== Gallery ==
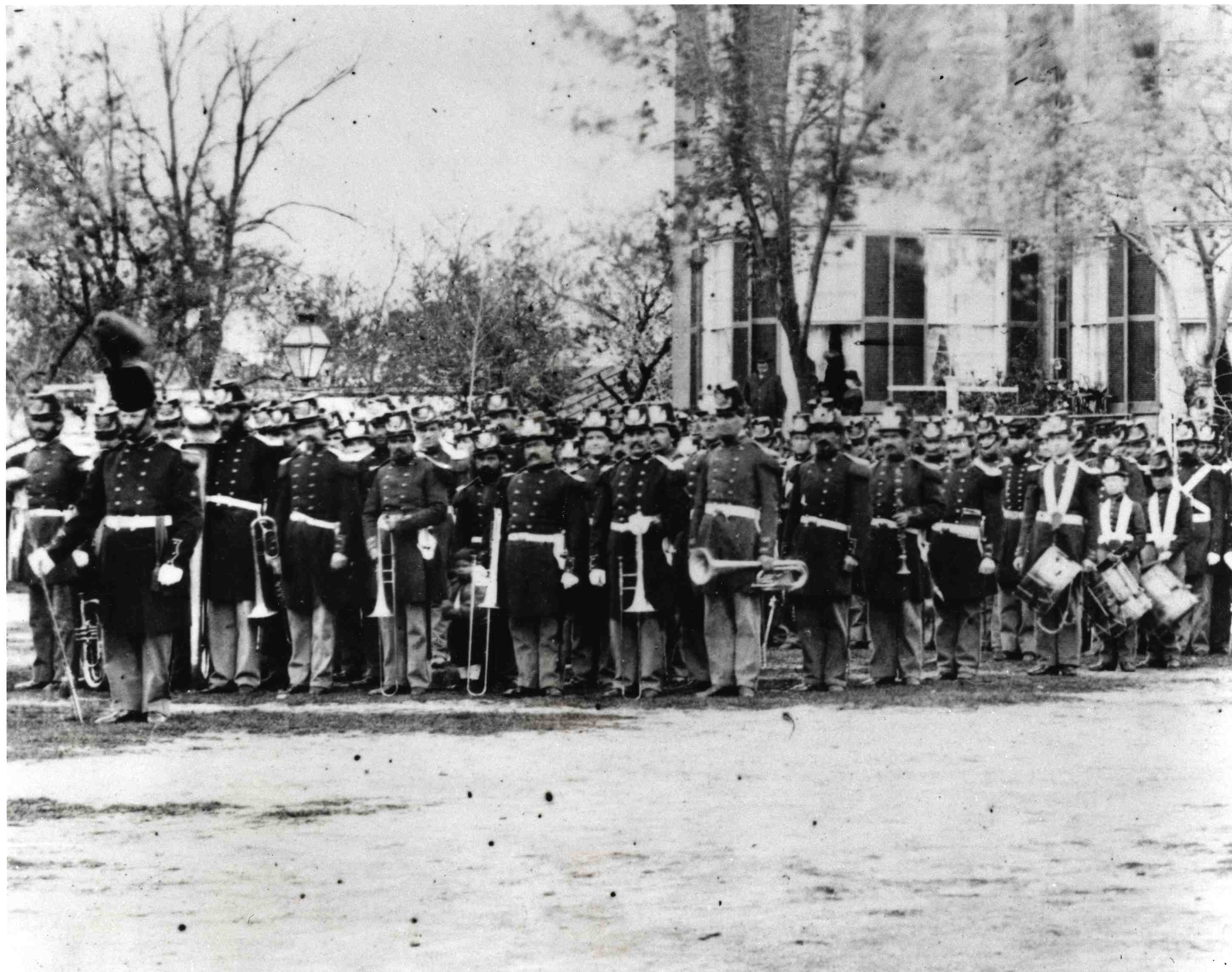
The United States Marine Band "The President's Own", 1864

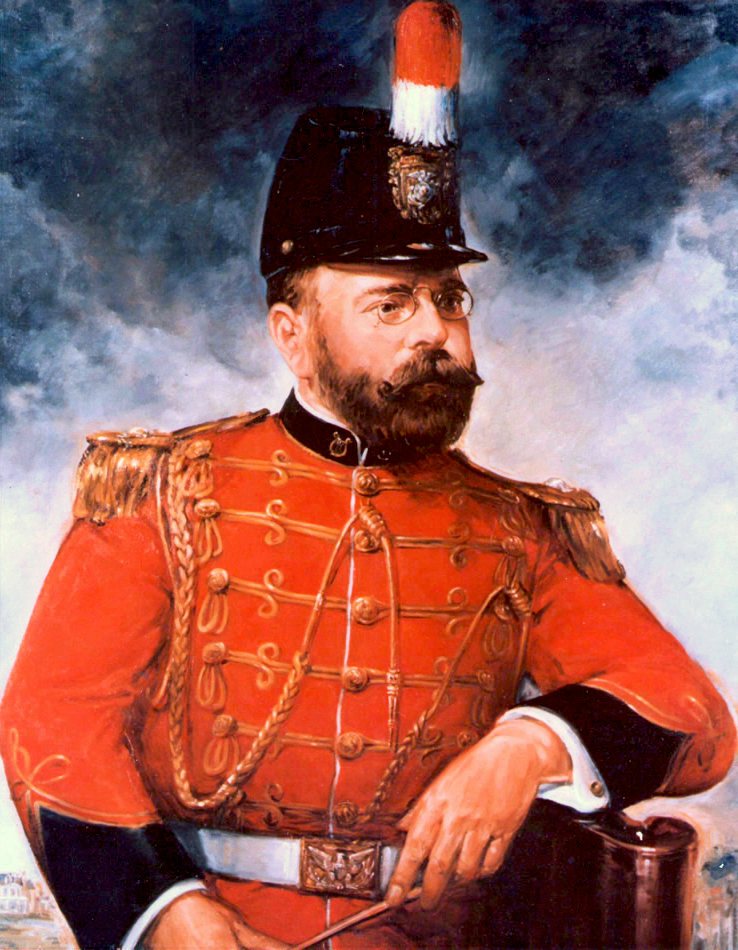
John Philip Sousa was appointed the 17th leader of the Marine Band on October 1, 1880, serving in this position until July 30, 1892.

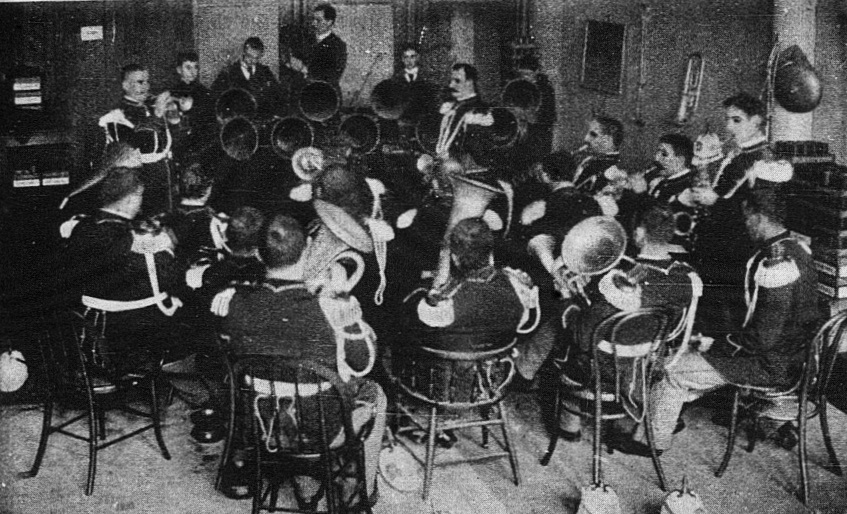
The Marine Band, led at the time by Sousa, was instrumental in the development of musical recording due partly to its proximity to the Columbia Phonograph Company, 1891.

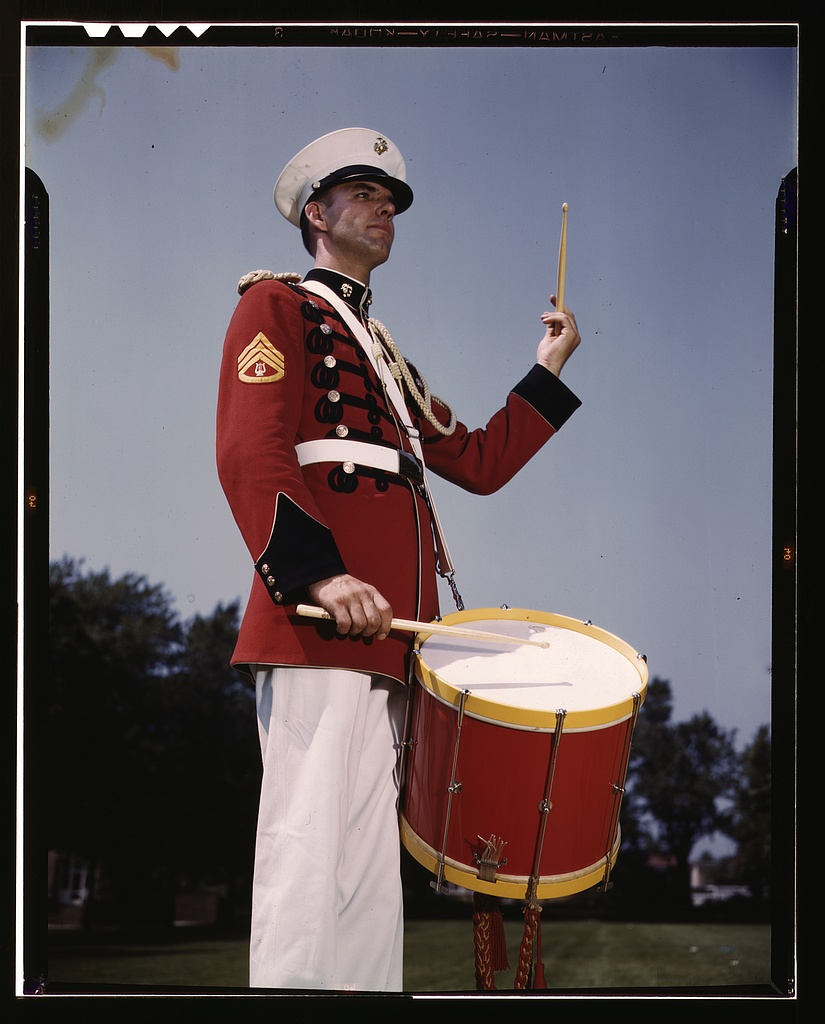
Charles Owen, a marimba soloist and timpanist, beating a drum at Marine Barracks Washington, May 1942

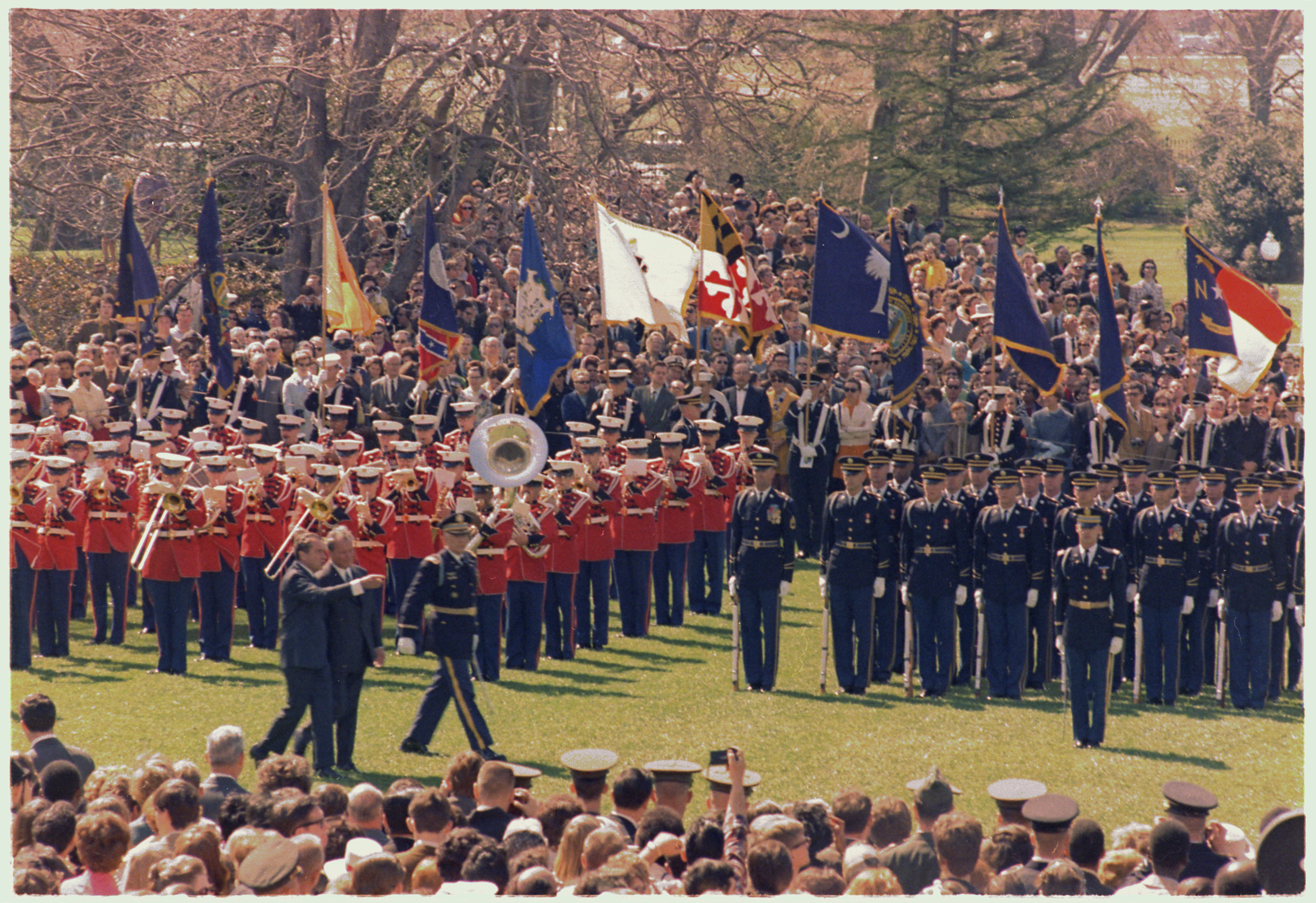
The Marine Band performing during a State Arrival Ceremony for West German chancellor Willy Brandt on the South Lawn, 1970

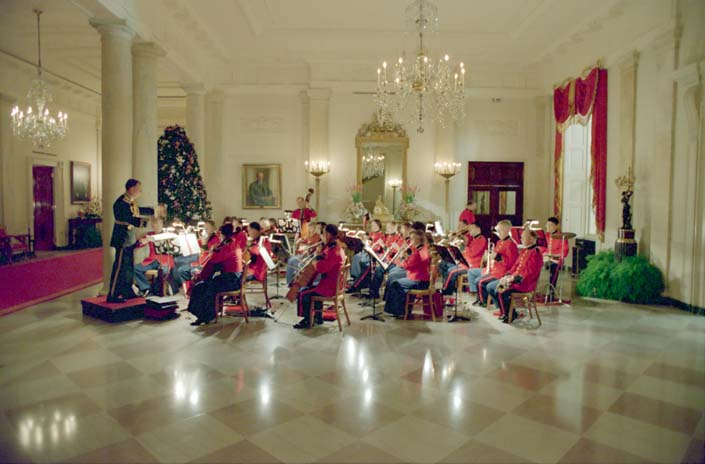
The Marine Band performing in the Entrance Hall at the White House in conjunction with an official dinner held for British prime minister Margaret Thatcher, 1988

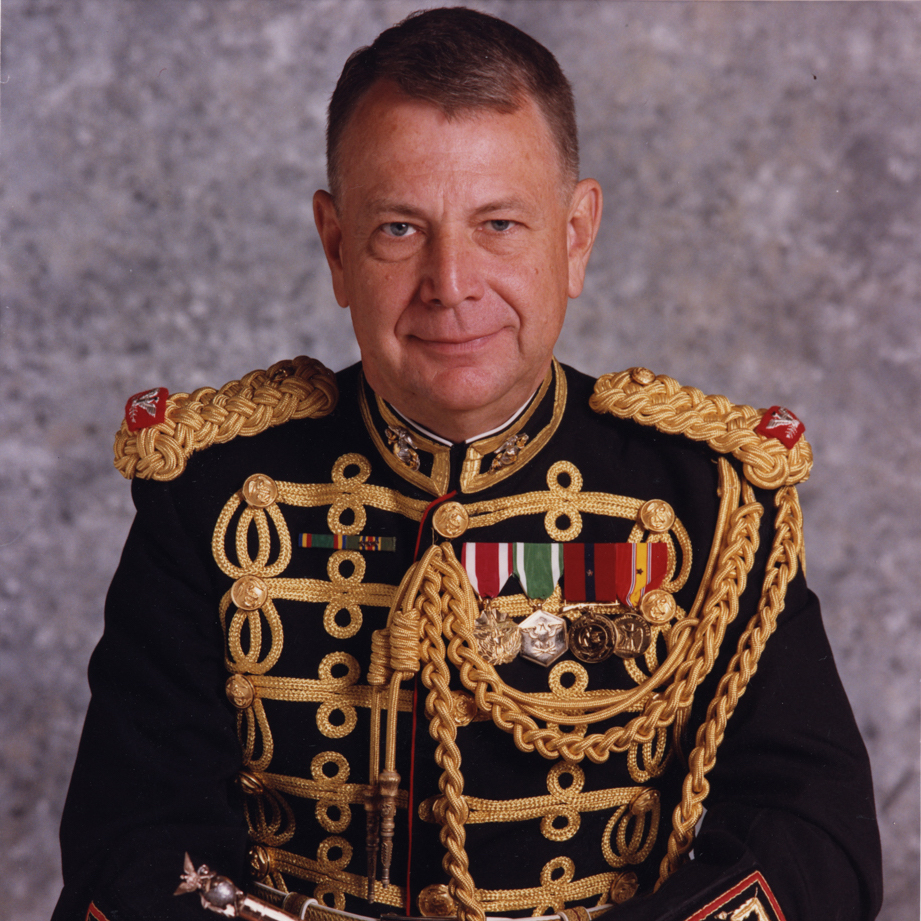
John R. Bourgeois, composer and director of the Marine Band from 1979 to 1996

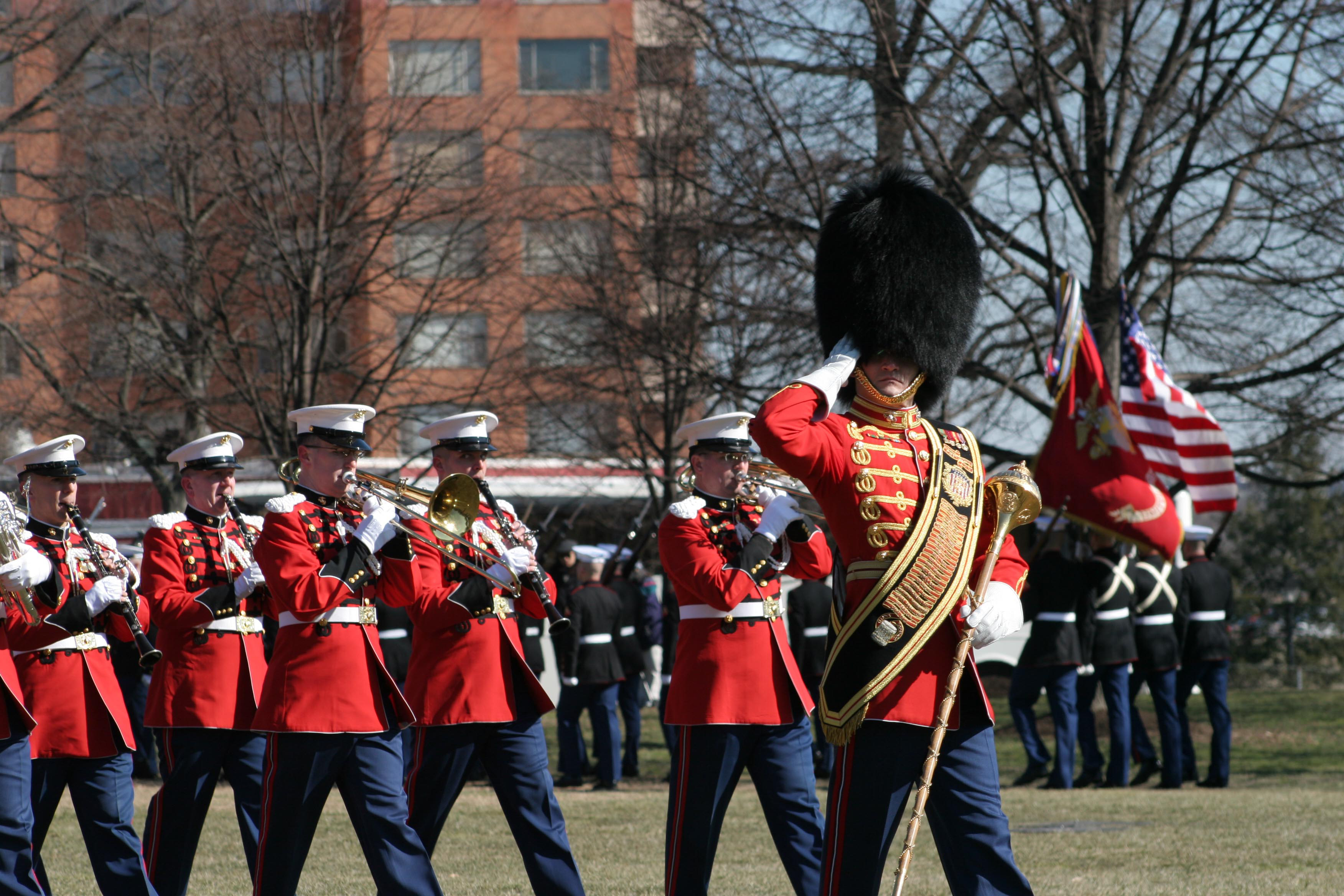
Master Gunnery Sgt Thomas D. Kohl leads the Marine Band during the 60th anniversary of the Battle of Iwo Jima commemoration ceremony at the Marine Corps War Memorial, 2005

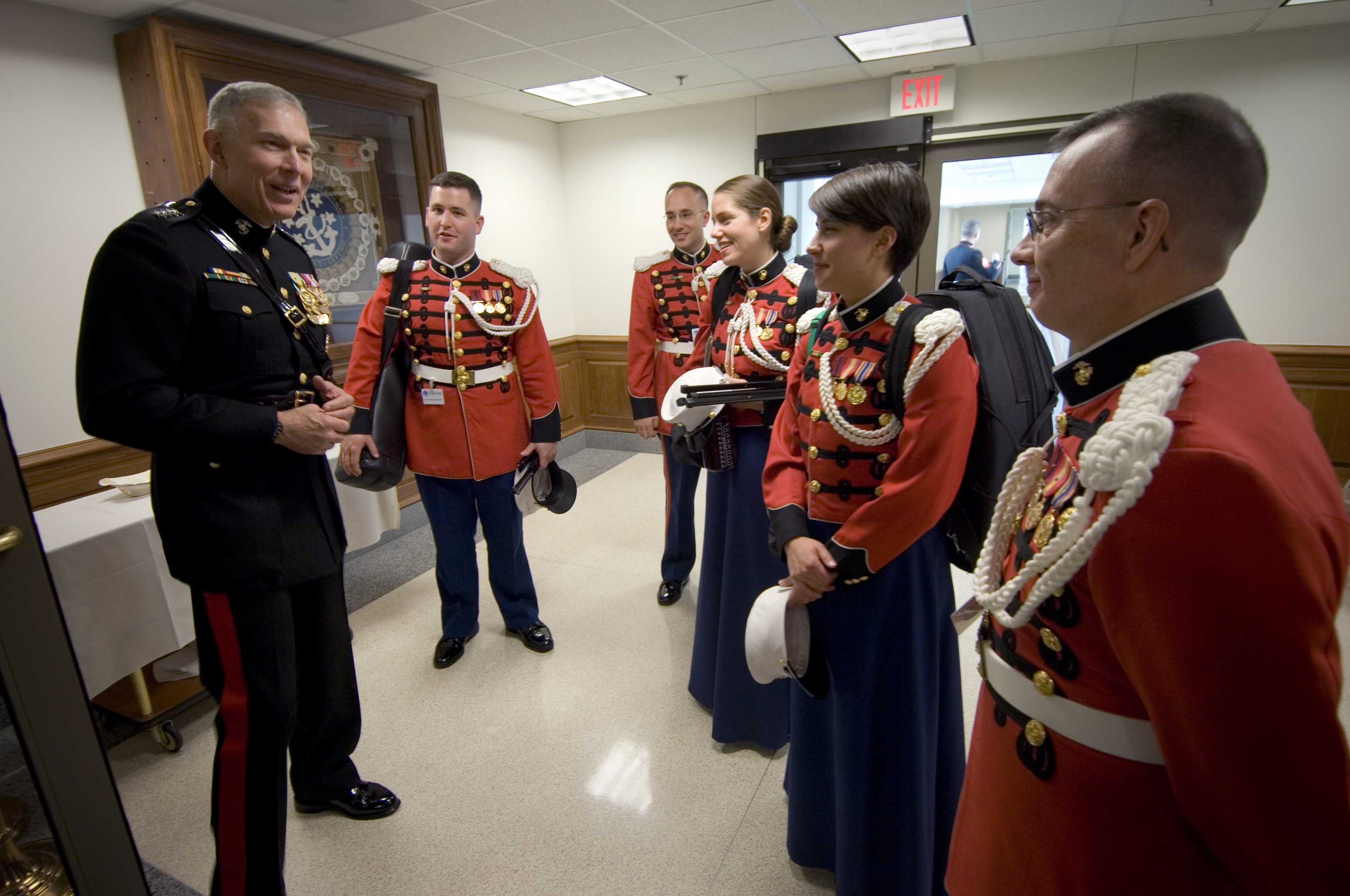
The Commandant of the Marine Corps, Gen. James T. Conway, speaking with members of the Marine Band during a ceremony in celebration of the 232nd Marine Corps birthday held at The Pentagon, 2007

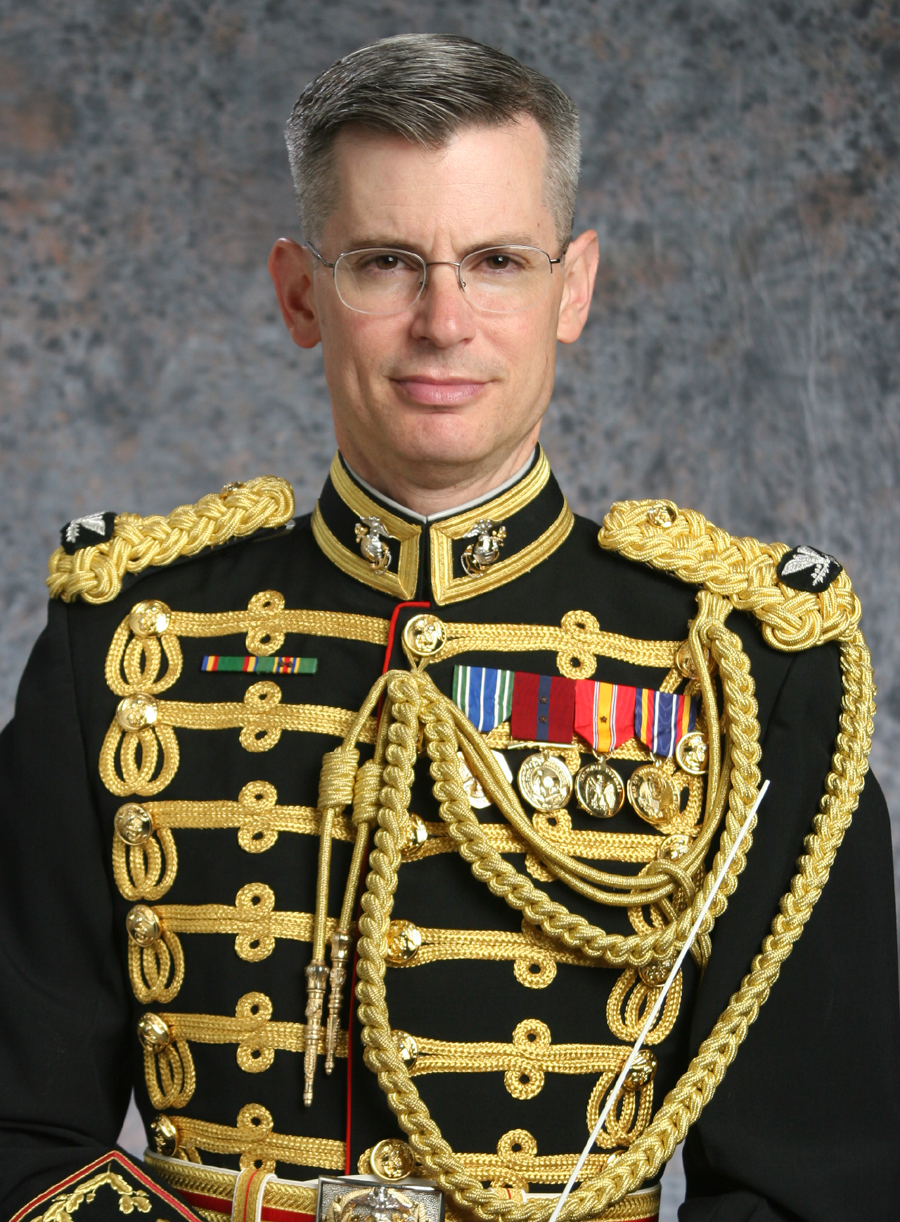
The 27th director of the Marine Band, Colonel Michael J. Colburn, who joined the band as a euphonium player in 1987 and was appointed director July 17, 2004

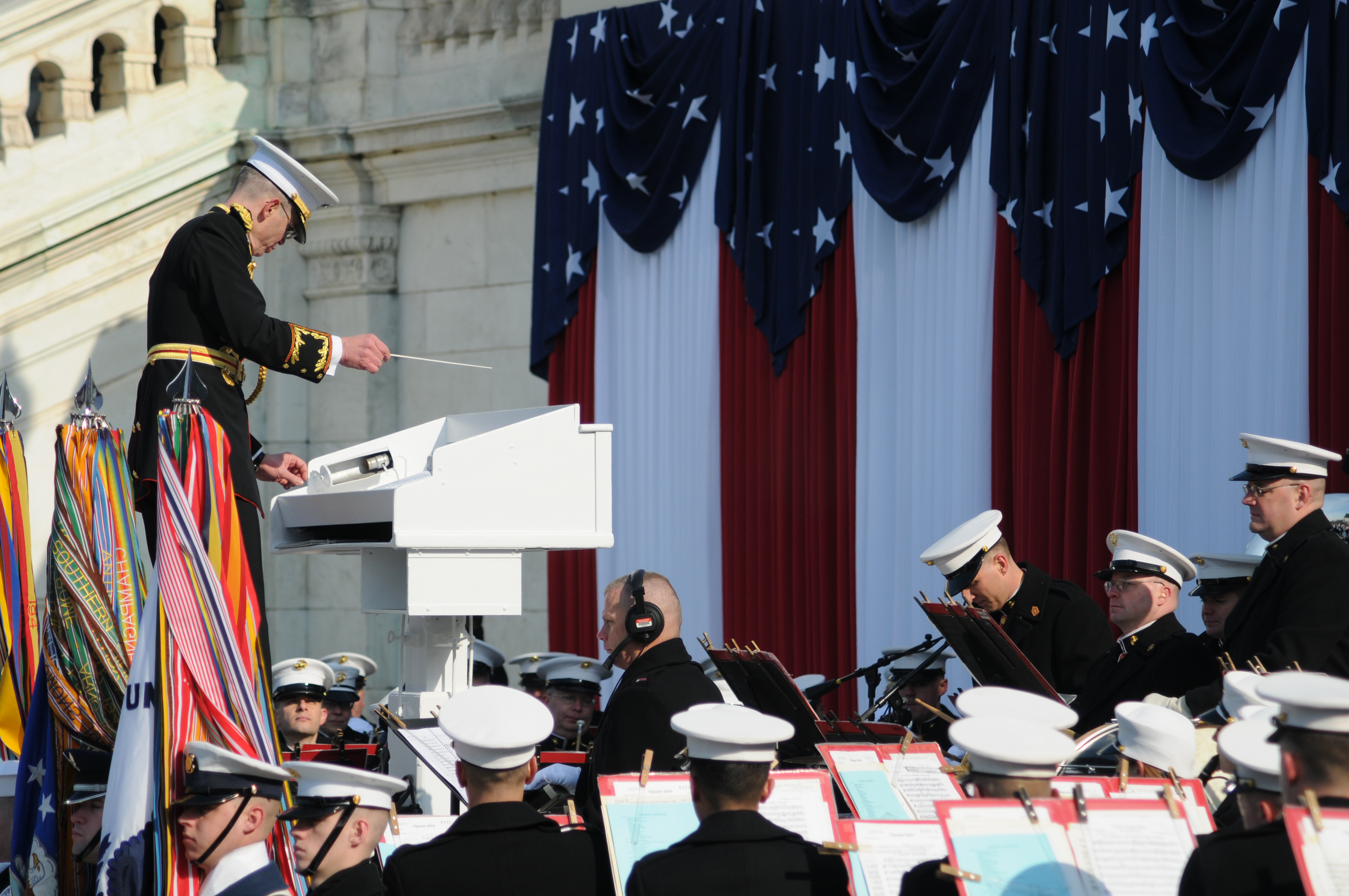
The Marine Band performing at the United States Capitol Building during the 56th Presidential Inauguration in Washington D.C., 2009

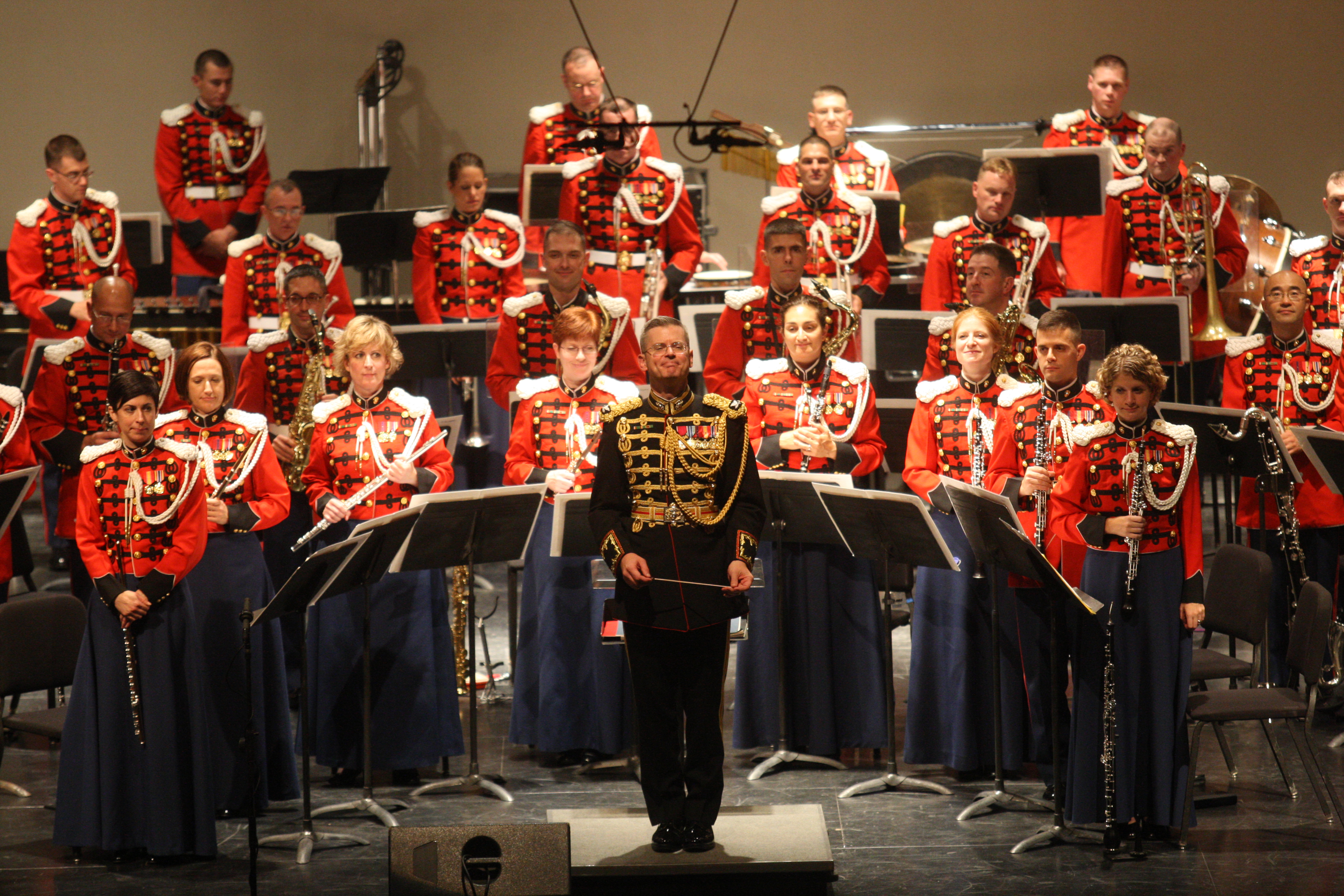
Colonel Colburn stands with the Marine Band after completing Sergei Rachmaninoff's Symphonic Dances during the Marine Band's performance at the East Carolina University in Greenville, North Carolina, 2011

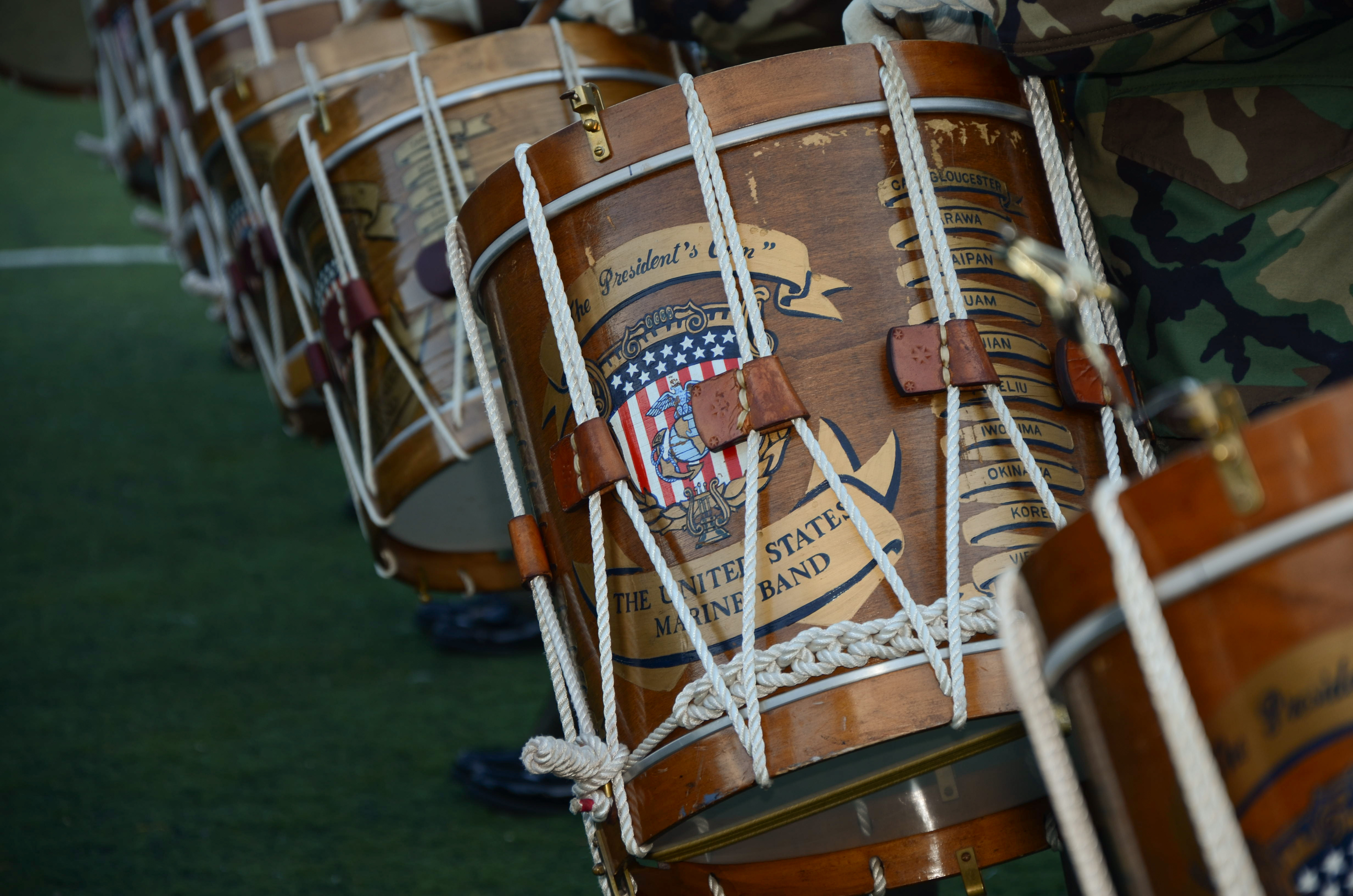
Members of the Marine Band holding drums during a rehearsal at Marine Barracks Washington for the 57th presidential inauguration, January 18, 2013

== See also ==
- John Philip Sousa Baton
- Red coat (military uniform) § United States
- National Presidential Band of Ukraine, Ukrainian equivalent
- Royal Marines Band Service, British equivalent
