= Francesco Fanciulli =

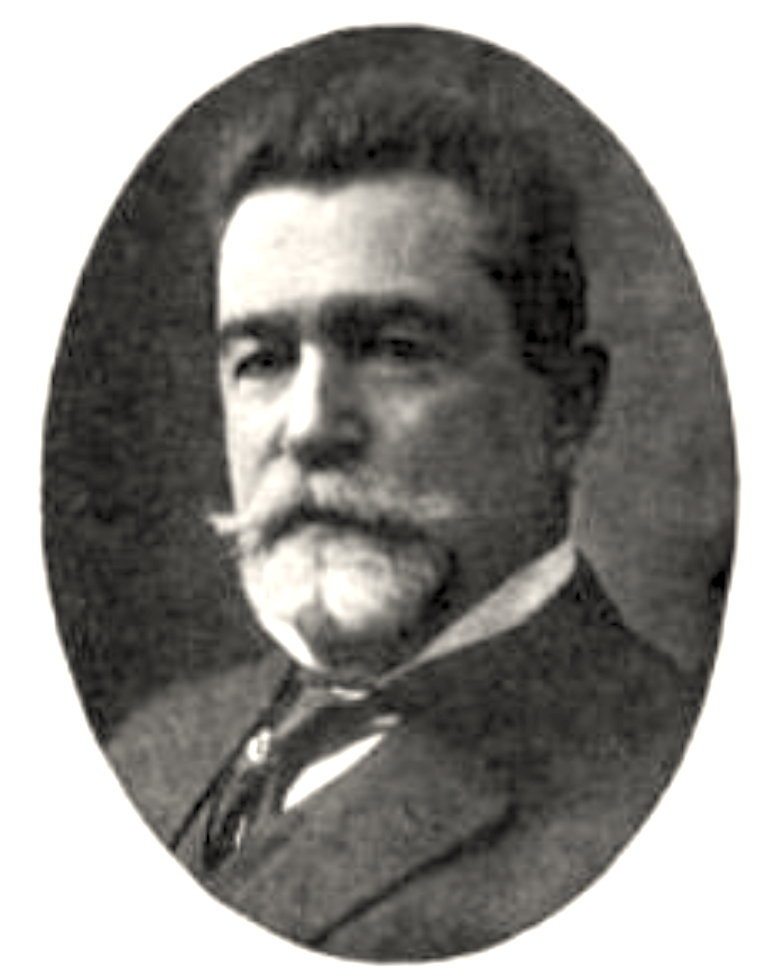
- 1915 photograph of Francesco Fanciulli. Taken shortly before his death.
- Born: Francesco Luigi Fanciulli; May 29, 1853; Porto Santo Stefano, Grand Duchy of Tuscany (modern-day Italy)
- Died: July 17, 1915 (aged 62); New York City, New York, United States

Francesco Fanciulli (May 29, 1853 – July 17, 1915) was a Grand Duchy of Tuscany-born naturalized American band director and composer. Between 1892 and 1897 he led the United States Marine Band.

== Biography ==
Francesco Luigi Fanciulli was born in Porto Santo Stefano. He learned cornet at a young age and played in a local band. Displaying talent, he was sent to study at the Florence Conservatory, where he obtained his diploma.

At age twenty he became the first cornettist at the Teatro della Pergola in Florence, and in 1875 he obtained a position in the orchestra of the Politeama Fiorentino. He was also engaged as a conductor at the Teatro Goldoni, at the Politeama, and at the Teatro Nazionale. Through touring Italy, he became known as a horn virtuoso, an opera director and composer.

In 1876 he emigrated to the United States to teach privately for a wealthy New York family. Arriving in New York on September 24, 1876, he also began working as an organist at St. Peter's Church in Brooklyn and as a teacher of piano and singing. He composed works for Patrick Gilmore's band. Among his compositions was a piece transcribed from his first opera The Voyage of Columbus that Gilmore described as "the most beautiful piece of descriptive music ever written." Gilmore's performances of Fanciulli's works led to their popularization. In 1885—the year he became a naturalized American—Fanciulli became principal conductor of the Mozart Musical Union, and in the early 1900s he became director of the Lillian Durell Opera Company of Boston.

In 1892, Fanciulli's reputation increased when he succeeded John Philip Sousa as head of the United States Marine Band. He was the fourth Italian-born director of the band, having been preceded by Venerando Pulizzi (1816–17; 1818–1827), Joseph Lucchesi (1844–1846) and Francis M. Scala (1855–1871). Fanciulli led his first concert on January 20, 1893, and presided over the inauguration of Grover Cleveland on March 4, 1893. Under his leadership, the Band won prestigious prizes such as the competition held in 1893 on the occasion of an international gathering of the most important American and European military bands in Hampton Roads. Fanciulli led the Band at the unveiling of Grant's Tomb on April 25, 1897.

Despite the popularity of his compositions and the Marine Band's well-attended concerts, Fanciulli always felt burdened by the shadow of Sousa, his predecessor. Nevertheless, Fanciulli always programmed Sousa's works alongside of his own. During a parade in Washington D.C. on June 1, 1897, Fanciulli, who normally alternated compositions of Sousa with his own, opposed the request of a superior to encore a Sousa march which would have altered the expected order of the pieces. The discussion degenerated into a dispute. Accused of insubordination, Fanciulli was placed under house arrest. President Cleveland intervened so that Fanciulli could be released to accompany him with the Band the next day during an important speech in Philadelphia. However, when Fanciulli returned to Washington, a commission of inquiry from the Navy found him guilty of "failure to obey a lawful order, use of disrespectful language toward an officer, and conduct being prejudice to the conduct of good order and discipline." Only the intervention of Theodore Roosevelt, at that time the United States Secretary of the Navy, mitigated the effects of the sentence. Fanciulli resumed his post, but on October 27, 1897, the Marine Headquarters announced that his assignment would not be renewed.

Fanciulli returned to New York assuming leadership of the Band of the 71st Regiment of the National Guard. In 1901 Fanciulli and his Band participated in the Pan-American Exposition in Buffalo, New York. In 1904, he left the National Guard and created a band of civil professionals, known as Fanciulli's Concert Band, and embarked on a tour of the United States. The national tour ended the following year as his management costs proved too expensive. For five seasons the Fanciulli's Concert Band continued its activity, holding concerts of great appeal in Central Park.

For the remaining years of his life Fanciulli continued to compose and conduct. He died in 1915 at the German Hospital and Dispensary in New York after a serious illness. He is buried at Woodlawn Cemetery in the Bronx, New York. His papers and manuscripts are kept at the New York Public Library for the Performing Arts.

== Compositions ==
Fanciiulli remains famous above all for his band songs, including the celebrated "Trip to Mars," "A Trip to Manhattan Beach," and "The National Patriot." He was also a composer of operas and operettas. His first opera, The Voyage of Columbus, was completed in 1876 during his trip to America with the intention of presenting it at the Metropolitan Grand Opera Competition, a competition in which he discovered that foreign musicians were not allowed. After the failure of the opera Malinche, Fanciulli had better luck with Priscilla: The Maid of Portsmouth, based on a story by Henry Wadsworth Longfellow that was performed on several occasions. Fanciulli also wrote two comic operas, The Maid of Paradise and The Interpreter.

=== Marches and other works for band ===
- A Day With Teddy's Terrors
- A Trip to Manhattan Beach
- A Trip to Mars
- Civic Fame March
- Fantasie Allegoric of New York Under Various Governments
- From Italy to America
- Gilmore's Band Tour in Europe
- Grand March Inaugural
- March of Progress
- Marine Band March
- Old Glory March
- Our National Patrol
- Romaine Waltzes
- Salve Regina
- Savoria, grand march
- Starving Innisfail
- The Electric Century
- The Evening Star March
- The Examiner's March
- The Florida Special March
- The Man from Maine
- The March to Creedmoor
- The Old Time Singing School
- The Stricken City
- Troop A (The President's Guard) March
- U.S.S. Massachusetts March
- With Dewey at Manila

Works

- The Voyage of Columbus (1876)
- Malinche
- Priscilla (Norfolk, Virginia, 1901)
- Sultana
- Daisy's Chain
- Gabriel de Montgomery
- A Maid of Paradise

== See also ==
- Birardi, Francesca. Fanciulli, Their Hero (Arcidosso: Edizioni Effigi, 2007) ISBN 9788889836422
