= Jason Fettig =

American musician

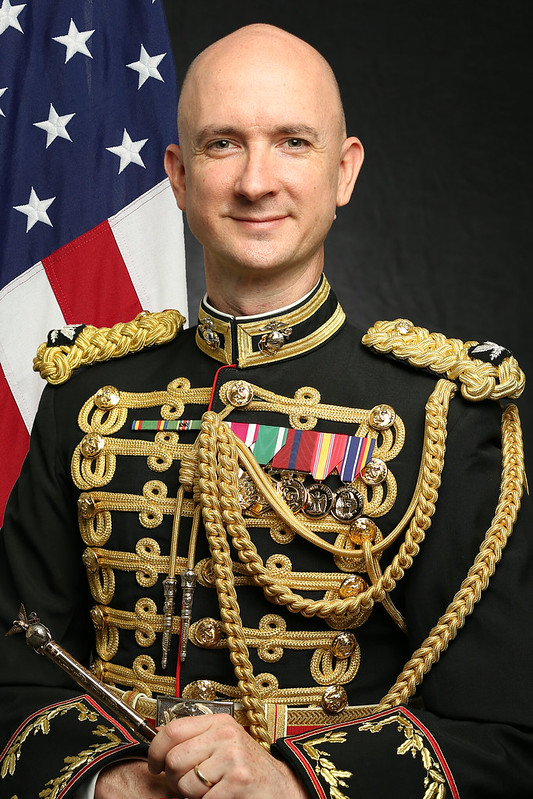
- Fettig in 2021
- Born: December 6, 1974 (age 51)
- Education: University of Massachusetts; University of Maryland
- Military career
- Allegiance: United States
- Branch: United States Marine Corps
- Service years: 1997–2023
- Rank: Colonel
- Commands: United States Marine Band
- Awards: Legion of Merit; Meritorious Service Medal; Navy Commendation Medal

Jason K. Fettig (born December 6, 1974) is a band director, conductor, and former Marine colonel who currently works as director of bands at the University of Michigan. Before his hiring, he served as the 28th director of the United States Marine Band and music adviser to the president of the United States.

Originally from Manchester, New Hampshire, Fettig was educated at the University of Massachusetts Amherst and the University of Maryland. An accomplished clarinetist, he assumed command of the United States Marine Band in 2014 after several years serving as the band's assistant director. Fettig retired on 20 December 2023, in a change of command ceremony where Lt. Col Ryan J. Nowlin assumed command of the Marine Band.

== Early life and education ==
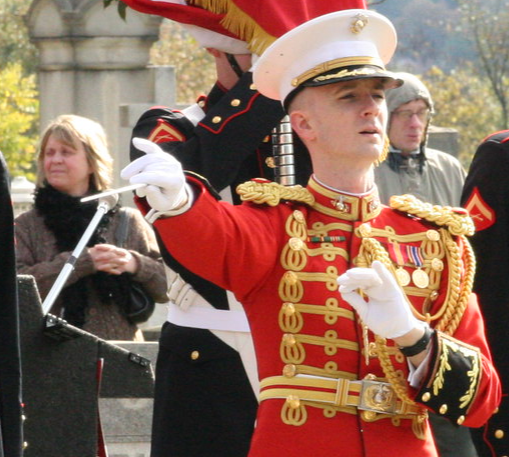
Fettig directing the Marine Band during annual memorial observances to John Philip Sousa at the Congressional Cemetery in 2007

Fettig shown directing the Marine Chamber Orchestra in a 2017 performance of the Overture to Don Giovanni

Originally from Manchester, New Hampshire, Fettig began playing clarinet at age eight. He graduated from Manchester Central High School, where he was drum major of the Manchester Central High School Marching Band, and completed his undergraduate education at the University of Massachusetts Amherst, where he studied music education. Later, he received a master's degree in orchestral conducting from the University of Maryland, College Park.

== Career ==
=== Early career ===
After completing his undergraduate studies, Fettig performed as a clarinetist with the American Wind Symphony Orchestra. He enlisted in the United States Marine Corps in 1997 and was posted to the U.S. Marine Band. In 2002 he was commissioned first lieutenant and appointed assistant director of the band. Two years later, in 2004, he was promoted to captain and the band's executive officer and, in 2007, was further promoted to major. During his tenure as assistant director, Fettig led expansion of the band's educational outreach programs, organizing clinics for music students in the District of Columbia Public Schools and creating an annual Young People's Concert.

=== Director of the United States Marine Band ===
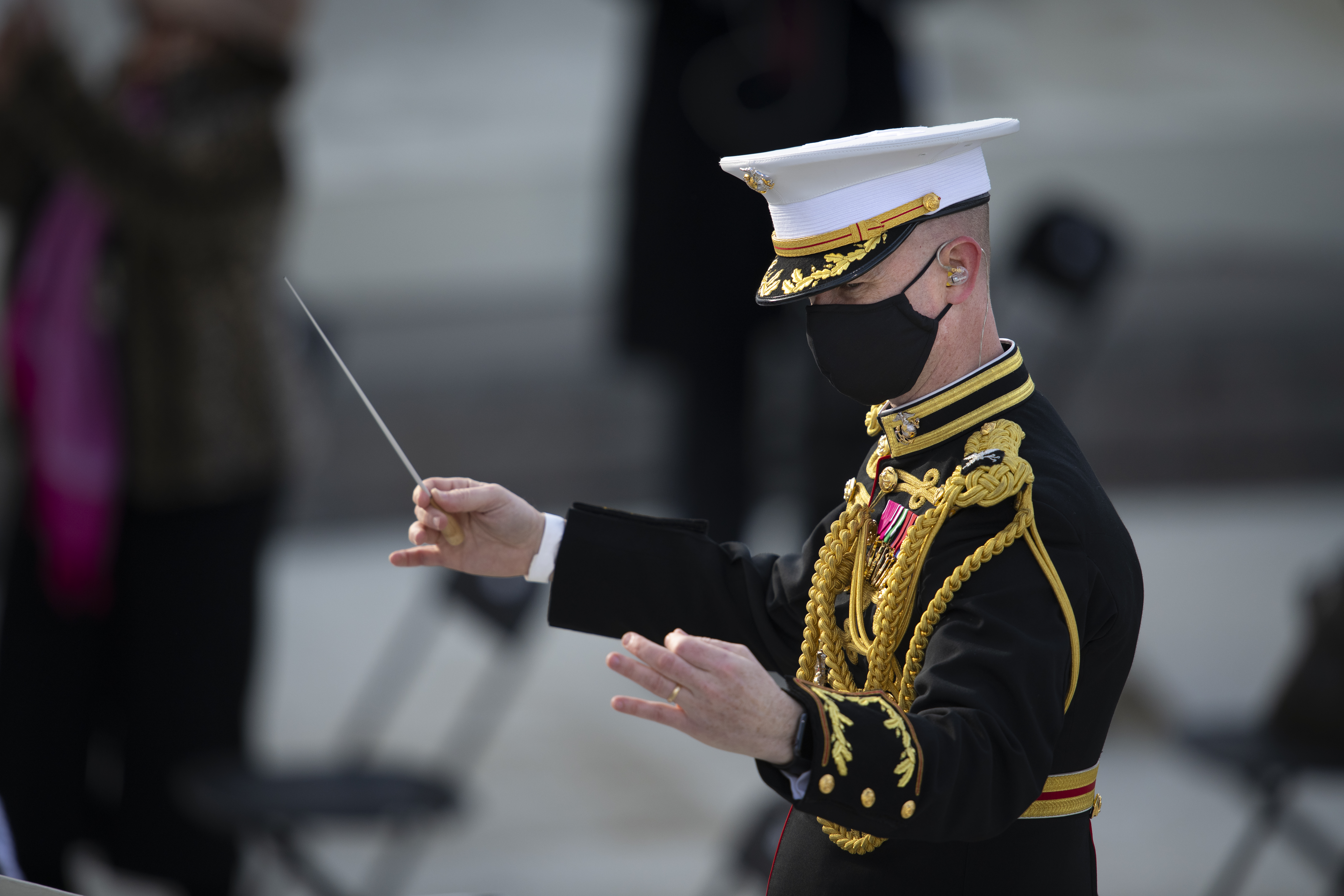
Fettig during the inauguration of Joe Biden

Fettig was promoted to lieutenant colonel, receiving the John Philip Sousa Baton and, with it, command of the United States Marine Band during a 2014 change of command ceremony officiated by Commandant of the Marine Corps General James F. Amos at Schlesinger Hall in Springfield, Virginia. He was advanced to colonel by order of President of the United States Donald Trump in an August 2017 promotion ceremony held in the Roosevelt Room of the White House. Fettig's was the first military promotion personally performed by Trump.

As director, Fettig led the Marine Band during live performances on Late Night with David Letterman and National Public Radio. He also launched a project to re-record all of the collected marches of John Philip Sousa, and personally conducted the world premieres of new works by Adam Schoenberg, David Conte, David Rakowski, Joel Puckett, and Narong Prangcharoen. In 2018, under Fettig's direction, the Marine Band was named as an artist in its first regional Emmy Award, given in the category Special Event Coverage Other than News and Sports, for the WNET-TV broadcast of the television special United States Marine Band "New England Spirit". In 2021, Fettig led the Marine Band in the inauguration of Joe Biden amidst the COVID-19 pandemic.

In his capacity as director of the United States Marine Band, Fettig was also music adviser to the President of the United States.

Col Fettig retired from the United States Marine Corps on December 20, 2023. LtCol Ryan Nowlin assumed the directorship in a change of command ceremony at the 2023 Midwest Clinic.

=== University of Michigan ===
On July 20, 2023, the University of Michigan School of Music, Theatre & Dance announced that Col Fettig would be joining its faculty as Director of Bands and professor in the Department of Conducting, starting in January 2024.

== Civilian awards ==
Fettig is the 2000 winner of the International Clarinet Association's Young Artist Competition. In 2014 he was elected a member of the American Bandmasters Association, considered the highest honor possible for American bandsmen.

== Military awards ==
- Navy Distinguished Service Medal
- Legion of Merit
- Meritorious Service Medal
- Navy Commendation Medal
- Navy Unit Commendation
- Navy Meritorious Unit Commendation with two bronze stars
- Marine Corps Good Conduct Medal
- National Defense Service Medal
- Global War on Terrorism Service Medal

Military offices
Preceded by Michael J. Colburn	Director of the United States Marine Band; 2014–2023	Succeeded by Ryan J. Nowling
