= Albert F. Schoepper =

American conductor

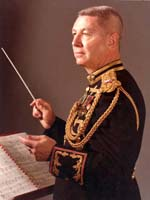
- Born: October 22, 1913; Rochester, New York, U.S.
- Died: July 29, 1997 (aged 83) Alexandria, Virginia, U.S.
- Allegiance: United States
- Branch: United States Marine Corps
- Service years: 1934–1972
- Rank: Colonel
- Commands: United States Marine Band

Albert F. Schoepper (October 22, 1913 – July 29, 1997) was leader of the United States Marine Band and White House music consultant from 1955 to 1972.

== Early life and education ==
Schoepper was born in Rochester, New York, the son of Albert O. Schoepper and Matilda "Matie" Stehler. He began his musical training at age 7 with the violinist Alfred Perrot. He attended East High School in Rochester, and studied at the Eastman School of Music under Gustav Tinlot. He also studied violin and conducting under Andrew Polah at Syracuse University.

== Career ==
"The Blue Danube"
Johann Strauss II's waltz "The Blue Danube" performed by the U.S. Marine Band with Schoepper conducting.

Schoepper joined the U.S. Marine Band in 1934, playing violin and saxophone. He often appeared as a violin soloist on network radio programs and was named concert master of the Marine Chamber Orchestra. He first conducted at the White House in 1942. He spent 38 years with the band. He joined the band as an enlisted man in 1934, playing violin and saxophone, and became the first Marine Band director to reach the rank of full colonel.

Schoepper performed as a soloist and conductor before royalty and heads of state and government at hundreds of White House engagements. His first White House appearance as conductor in 1942 before King George II of Greece. Later, when the White House was being renovated, he conducted all the Blair House engagements for Harry S. Truman.

In 1955 Schoepper replaced William F. Santelmann as Marine Band Director. Schoepper directed "The President's Own" (as the Marine Band is known) at the inaugurations of Dwight D. Eisenhower, John F. Kennedy, Lyndon B. Johnson, and Richard M. Nixon.

Schoepper was in charge of the band for 17 years. He took the full band on 18 concert tours, during which he estimated that it played before some 12 million people. Schoepper also served as music adviser to the White House. He helped organize soirees with the country's finest artists and appearances of its most popular performers.

During the Johnson presidency, members of the White House social staff, as the story is told, had a "frank exchange of views" because they considered Schoepper too indulgent of Johnson's passion for the foxtrot, neglecting other rhythms that his dancing guests might have favored.

== Later life and death ==
For his last performance at the White House, Schoepper led the Marine Chamber Orchestra at a reception for retiring members of Congress. Once the final chord faded, Nixon introduced him and toasted him as the guests stood and saluted.

Schoepper died July 29, 1997, in Alexandria, Virginia, of pneumonia, weeks after experiencing a stroke from which he never recovered.
