= Sara Sheffield =

American opera singer and Marine

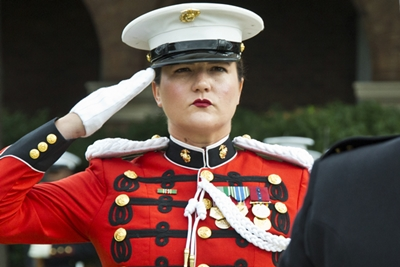
- Sheffield pictured in 2017
- Military career
- Branch: United States Army; United States Marine Corps
- Rank: Chief Warrant Officer 3
- Units: "Pershing's Own" United States Army Band "The President's Own" United States Marine Band

Sara Sheffield is an American singer and Marine from Jacksonville, Texas who, in 2005, became the first female feature vocalist in the history of the United States Marine Band.

== Early life and education ==
Sara Sheffield, a mezzo-soprano, was raised in Jacksonville, Texas. As a child, she was trained in piano, but later switched her musical focus to voice.

Sheffield's first solo vocal performance was at the age of 11 at Jacksonville's Central Baptist Church. Five years later she began private voice lessons. She graduated from Jacksonville High School in 1997. While in high school, Sheffield was a three time member of the Texas All-State Choir. In 2001, Sheffield received a bachelor of music in vocal performance from the University of North Texas College of Music, where she studied under Cody Garner. She later earned a Master of Business Administration from George Mason University.

Sheffield performs Saint-Saëns' Mon cœur s'ouvre à ta voix in 2015

== Career ==
After completion of her undergraduate studies at the University of North Texas, Sheffield apprenticed at the El Paso Opera and Amarillo Opera and then enlisted in the U.S. Army as a vocalist. She completed United States Army Basic Training at Fort Jackson in South Carolina and was posted to the Military District of Washington, where she was assigned to "Pershing's Own" United States Army Band at Fort Myer.

In 2004, she auditioned for "the President's Own" United States Marine Band and, in May 2005, was accepted as the first female vocalist in the ensemble's then 207-year history.

She was promoted to Chief Warrant Officer 3 on March 1, 2024 and has served as the Deputy Director for Administration and Production since September 2023.

In 2008 Sheffield was named a regional finalist in the Metropolitan Opera National Council Mid-Atlantic Auditions.

== Awards and decorations ==
Sheffield's awards include the Navy and Marine Corps Commendation Medal, Army Commendation Medal, Army Achievement Medal, and Marine Corps Good Conduct Medal, Sixth Award.

== See also ==
- Bill Pearce
