= Michael J. Colburn =

American conductor

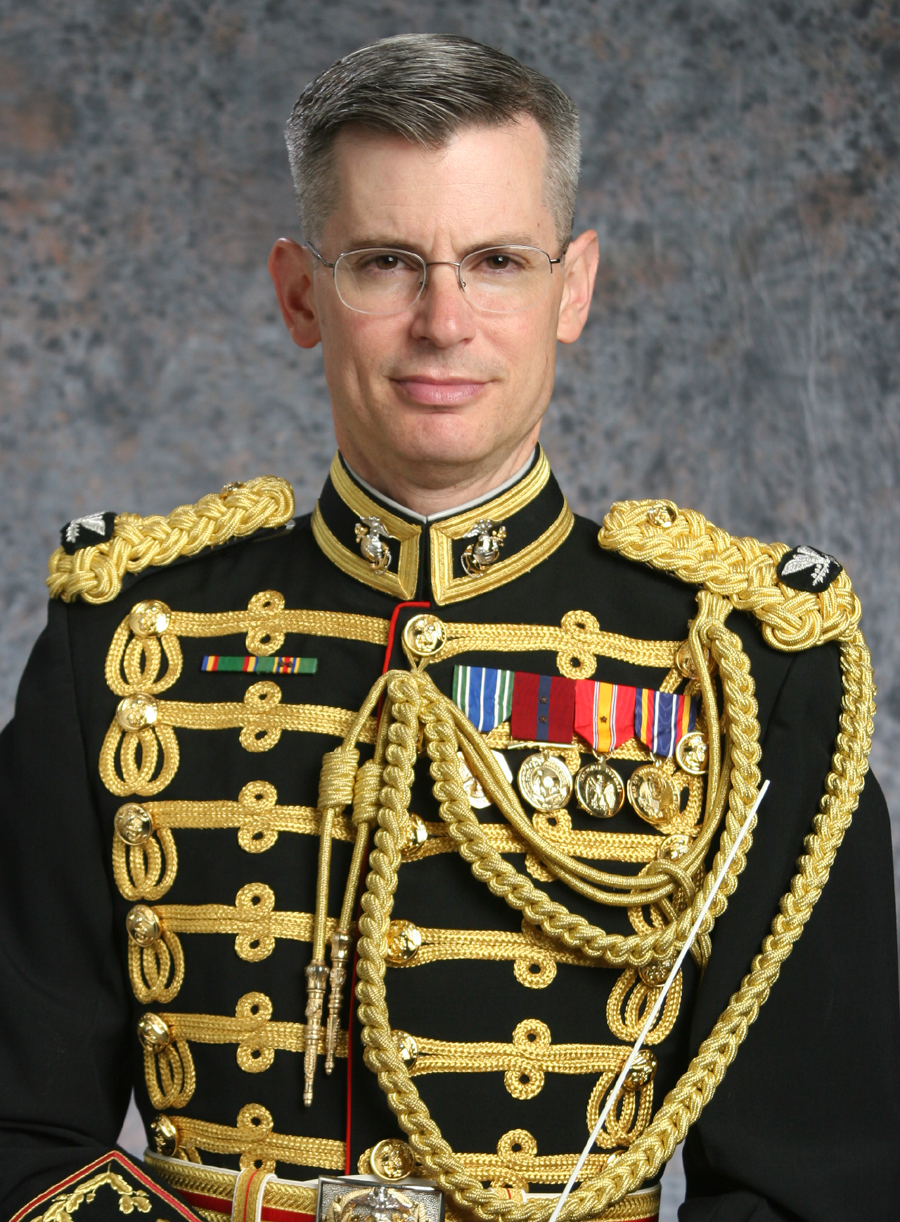
- Colburn as Director of United States Marine Band
- Born: 1964 (age 61–62)
- Alma mater: State University of New York; Arizona State University; George Mason University
- Spouse: Nancy Shepard Colburn
- Children: 2
- Military career
- Allegiance: United States
- Branch: United States Marine Corps
- Service years: 1987–2014
- Rank: Colonel
- Commands: United States Marine Band
- Awards: Navy Distinguished Service Medal; Legion of Merit
- Other work: Director of Bands at Butler University; Director of Orchestras at Crane School of Music

Colonel Michael J. Colburn (born 1964 in Vermont) was the 27th Director of the United States Marine Band and a colonel in the Marine Corps. Colburn joined "The President's Own" Marine Band in 1987 as a euphonium player and became the band's director in 2004. Colburn is a native of St. Albans, Vermont, and graduated from Bellows Free Academy there in 1982. He attended Crane School of Music at SUNY Potsdam for two years before transferring to Arizona State University, where he earned his bachelor's degree in music performance in 1986. He received his master's degree in conducting from George Mason University in 1991.

As Director of the Marine Band, Colburn conducted the group's performances at high-level state events including United States presidential inaugurations, state funerals and state arrival ceremonies.

Colburn retired his commission on 12 July 2014. He was succeeded by Lieutenant Colonel Jason Fettig.

Formerly director of bands at Butler University in Indianapolis, Colburn serves as conductor of the Me2 Orchestra/Burlington, and in January 2023 he joined the faculty of the University of Vermont in an adjunct capacity. Currently, Colburn serves as music director and conductor of the Orchestra of Northern New York (ONNY) as well as visiting professor of conducting and conductor of the orchestra at the Crane School of Music at SUNY Potsdam.

== Awards ==
- Navy Distinguished Service Medal
- Legion of Merit
- Army Achievement Medal
- Navy Unit Commendation
- Meritorious Unit Commendation (3 awards)
- Marine Corps Good Conduct Medal (3 awards)
- National Defense Service Medal (2 awards)
- Global War on Terrorism Service Medal
