= Venerando Pulizzi =

- Born: Venerando Pulizzi; 1792; Catania, Italy
- Died: 8 October 1852 (aged 59–60); Washington, DC
- Military career
- Allegiance: United States of America
- Branch: United States Marine Corps
- Service years: 1805-1852
- Rank: Sergeant Major
- Commands: Leader of the United States Marine Band in 1816 and 1818-1827

Venerando Pulizzi (ca. 1792 - October 8, 1852) was an Italian-American musician and leader and member of the United States Marine Band.

== Early life and enlistment ==
In February 1805, at age 12, Pulizzi was enlisted in Catania, Sicily, Italy along with his father, Felice Pulizzi, his uncle Francesco Pulizzi, his little brother, ten-year-old Gaetano and fourteen other Italian musicians, by the American Navy to form a "Band of Music" for the Marine Corps. It had been President Thomas Jefferson who in 1803 suggested to then-Commandant of the Marine Corps William Ward Burrows that Italian musicians be enlisted in the Marine Corps and added to the current Marine Band. Commandant Burrows sent Captain John Hall to southern Italy where American ships were stationed during the war with Tripoli.

Captain Hall contacted a local band leader in Catania, Gaetano Carusi, who recruited the musicians. Venerando and Gaetano Pulizzi were not the only boys in the Band as the musicians who were married brought their wives and children with them. The group of musicians also included Carusi's three sons Samuele (10 years old), Ignazio (9), and Gaetano (8), Ignazio Di Mauro (27), Domenico Guarnaccia (28), Salvatore Lauria (26), Pasquale Lauria (28), Giuseppe Papa (21), Antonio Paterno' (41), Giacomo Sardo (24), Michele Sardo (28), Gaetano Sardo (10), and Corrado Signorello (28).

The Band was supplied with instruments at the Corps' expense in Messina and then assigned to active duty on board the warship USS President. After an adventurous journey, which saw them also participate in gunfire off the coast of Tripoli, the group sailed safely to the United States.

They arrived in Washington, D.C. on Sept. 19, 1805 and after a brief period of transition, the Band was dismantled and its members were assimilated into the United States Marine Band and became an integral part of the organization. On July 31, 1806, Commandant Wharton ordered that the "Italian Band" live in "quarters within the garrison" and be "under the same regulations as the old band is and has been."

== Band leadership ==
Venerando Pulizzi grew up to be an outstanding member of the Band; he was promoted to Fife Major already on June 9, 1812. He served twice as leader of the United States Marine Band—briefly in 1816-1817 and then from 1818 to 1827. He first succeeded William Farr (1799–1804) and Charles S. Ashworth (1804–16) as acting Leader/Drum Major from Oct. 17, 1816 to Dec. 10, 1817, until the new Leader/Drum Major John Powley enlisted. In 1818 Pulizzi resumed his duties of acting Leader/Drum Major and was officially promoted to Leader/Drum Major on July 24, 1824. He served with the band in this capacity until Sept. 3, 1827. He was the first American of Italian ancestry to be the leader in a major American band or orchestra.

The highlight of his tenure was the visit of Lafayette to the United States in 1824–25. Lafayette arrived in Washington on Oct. 12, 1824 and was greeted with the largest parade ever held in the capital. Two days later, President Monroe hosted a state dinner in his honor. Music for both occasions was furnished by the Marine Band, directed by Venerando Pulizzi. During the banquet hosted at the White House in celebration of the birthday of Lafayette, September 6, 1825, as the guests stood for the toast, Pulizzi led the Marine Band in playing The Marseillaise.

Venerando Pulizzi continued for some years to play in the band after the end of his tenure. He left the band and was promoted to sergeant major of the Marine Corps in 1832 and served at Headquarters until his death in 1852.
