= Canova (crater) =

Crater on Mercury

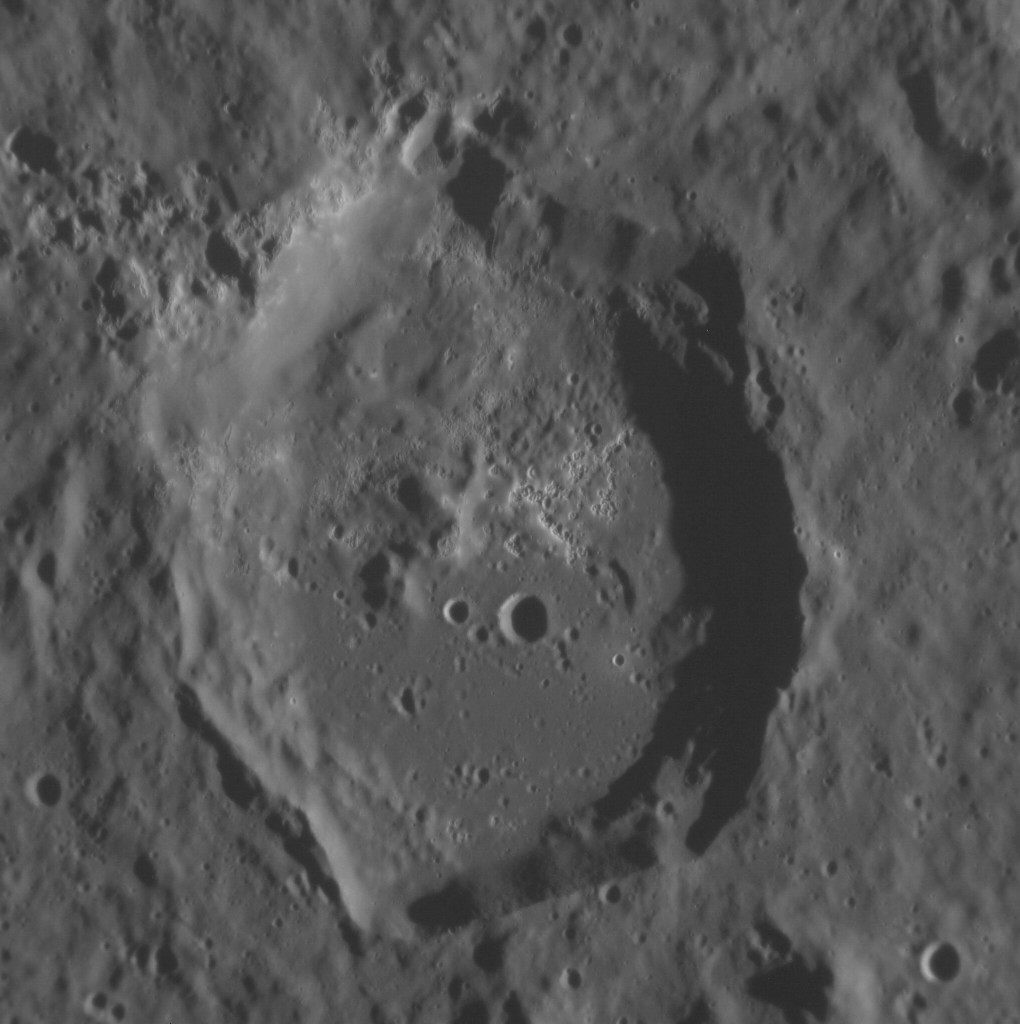
- Slightly oblique MESSENGER NAC image of Canova
- Feature type: Central-peak impact crater
- Location: Victoria quadrangle, Mercury
- Coordinates: 25.6°N 3.71°W
- Diameter: 46 km (29 mi)
- Eponym: Antonio Canova

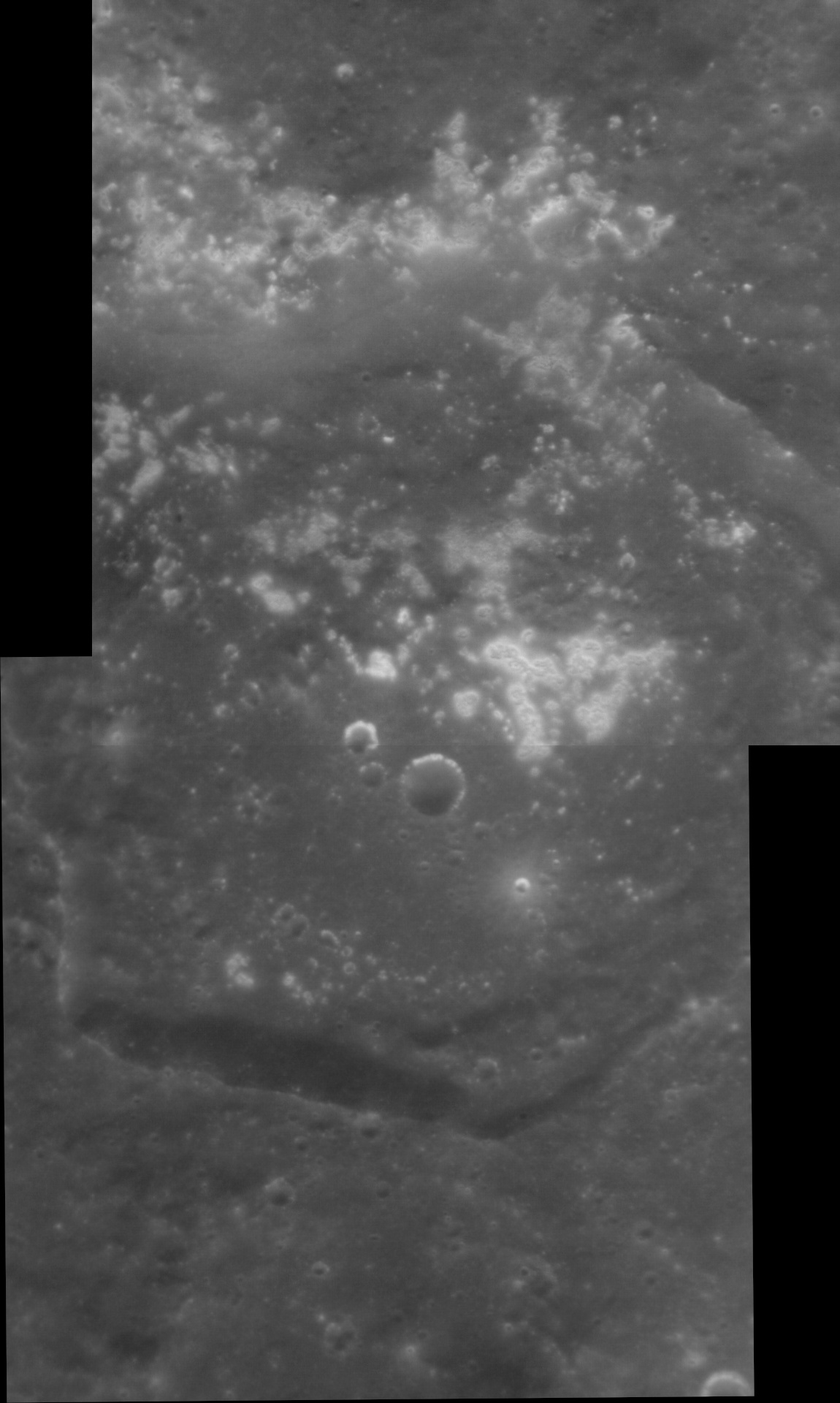
Detail of Canova crater, also from MESSENGER NAC

Canova is a crater on Mercury. Its name was adopted by the International Astronomical Union (IAU) in 2018, after Italian sculptor Antonio Canova.

Hollows are present within the crater and to the northwest of it. In the same area, there are uneven dips in the ground that may have been caused by violent volcano activity.

To the northeast of Canova is Piazzolla crater. To the east is Kyōsai.

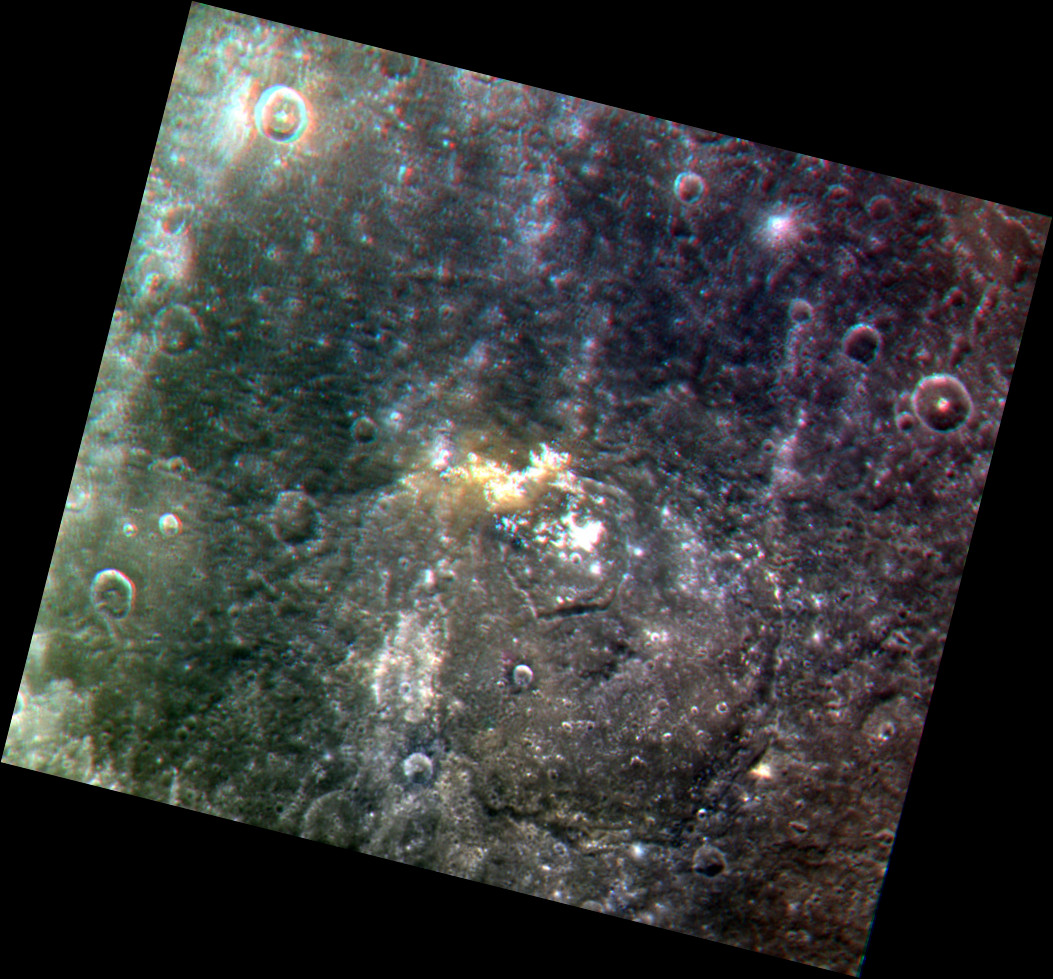
Approximate color image of the region around Canova crater
