= The Gladiator March =

1886 march by John Philip Sousa

The Gladiator March
Performed by the U.S. Air Force Concert Band

"The Gladiator" is a march by John Philip Sousa, written in 1886 while Sousa was leader of the US Marine Band.

The Gladiator was written as a tribute to Charles B. Towle, a journalist at the Boston Traveler. The journalist introduced him to the Knights Templar. Speculation has long surrounded the title for the piece, but one hypothesis is that the title referred to Towle himself, a gladiator of sorts who used a pen instead of a sword. Another plausible hypothesis is that the piece may have been written about an article Towle wrote for the Boston Traveler.

Sousa had not written many marches before that, and none of them received great popularity. The Gladiator, however, sold over a million copies - a record for the time and was soon performed frequently. It follows normal march style, IAABBCCDCDC, and is played at the normal pace of most marches: 120-128 beats per minute. Although marches such as Semper Fidelis, The Washington Post, Stars and Stripes Forever and Hands Across the Sea have achieved greater popularity, the Gladiator is still regarded as John Philip Sousa's first success.

== Recorded versions ==
- The Band of H.M. Coldstream Guards, cond. by Capt. J. Causley Windram. Recorded in London on January 11, 1942. It was released by EMI on the His Master's Voice label as catalog number B 9275.

== See also ==
- List of marches by John Philip Sousa
