= Imperial Edward =

- by John Philip Sousa
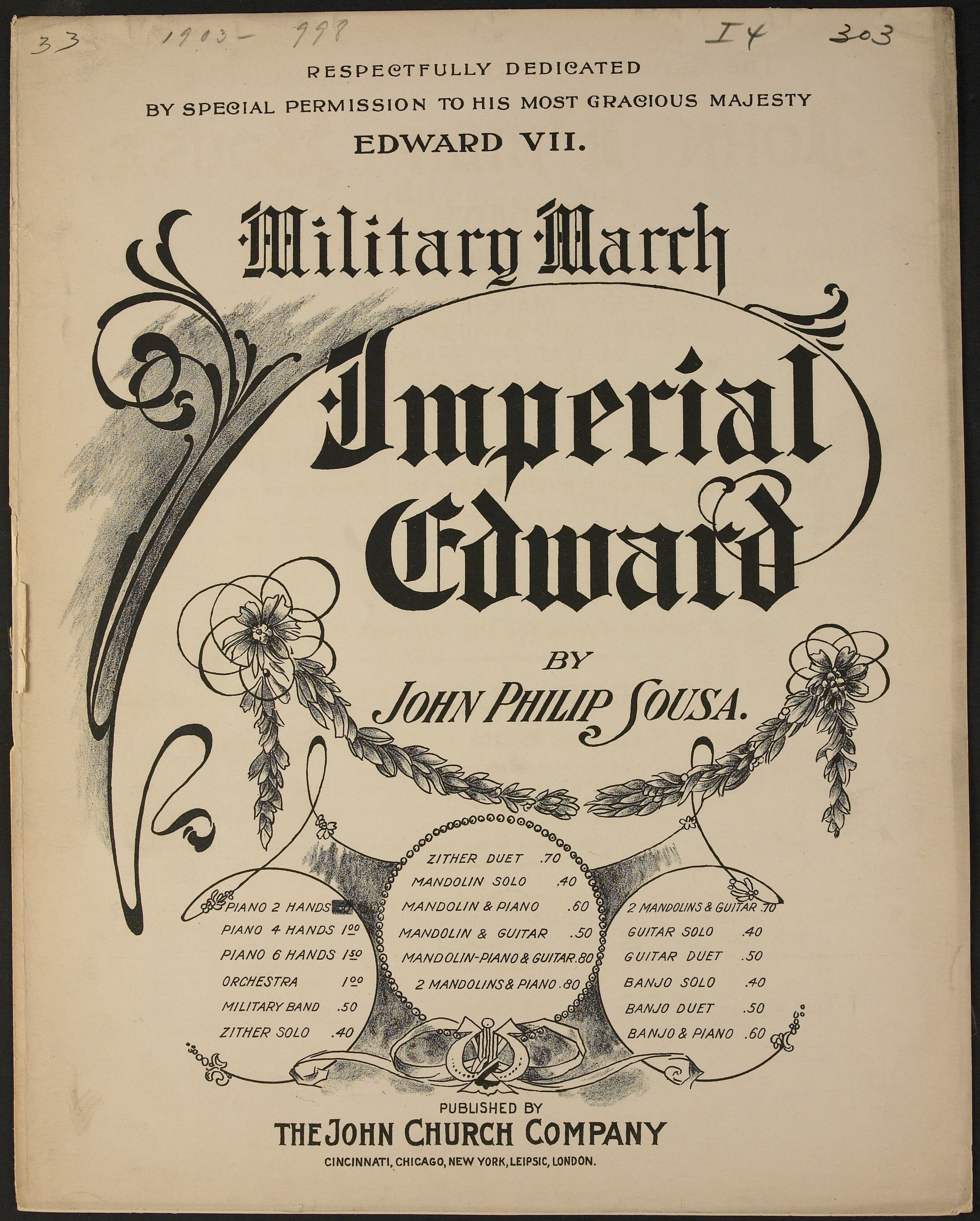
- Year: 1902
- Genre: March
- Dedication: King Edward VII of the United Kingdom
- Published: 1902, Cincinnati
- Publisher: John Church Company

Audio sample
- United States Marine Band performing the march: file; help

"Imperial Edward" is an American military march composed in 1902 by John Philip Sousa, dedicated to Edward VII, King of the United Kingdom. Sousa received permission to dedicate the march to the king during a conversation with the royal family following his command performance concert at Sandringham on December 1, 1901. Sousa's band premiered the march in Montreal on May 21, 1902. Sousa would later conduct the piece for King Edward in January 1903 during a performance at Windsor Castle.

== History ==
Edward VII and Sousa

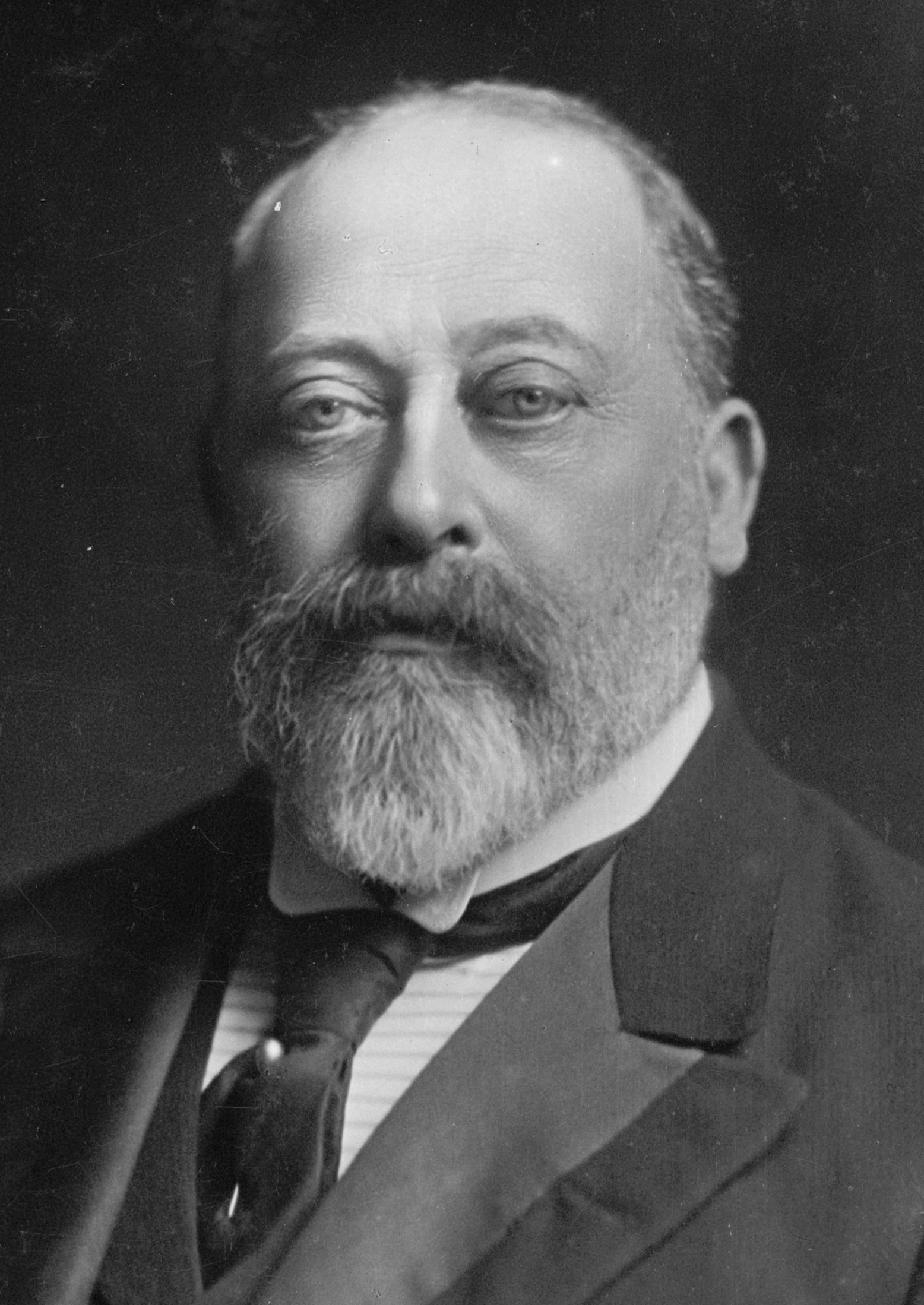
Edward VII

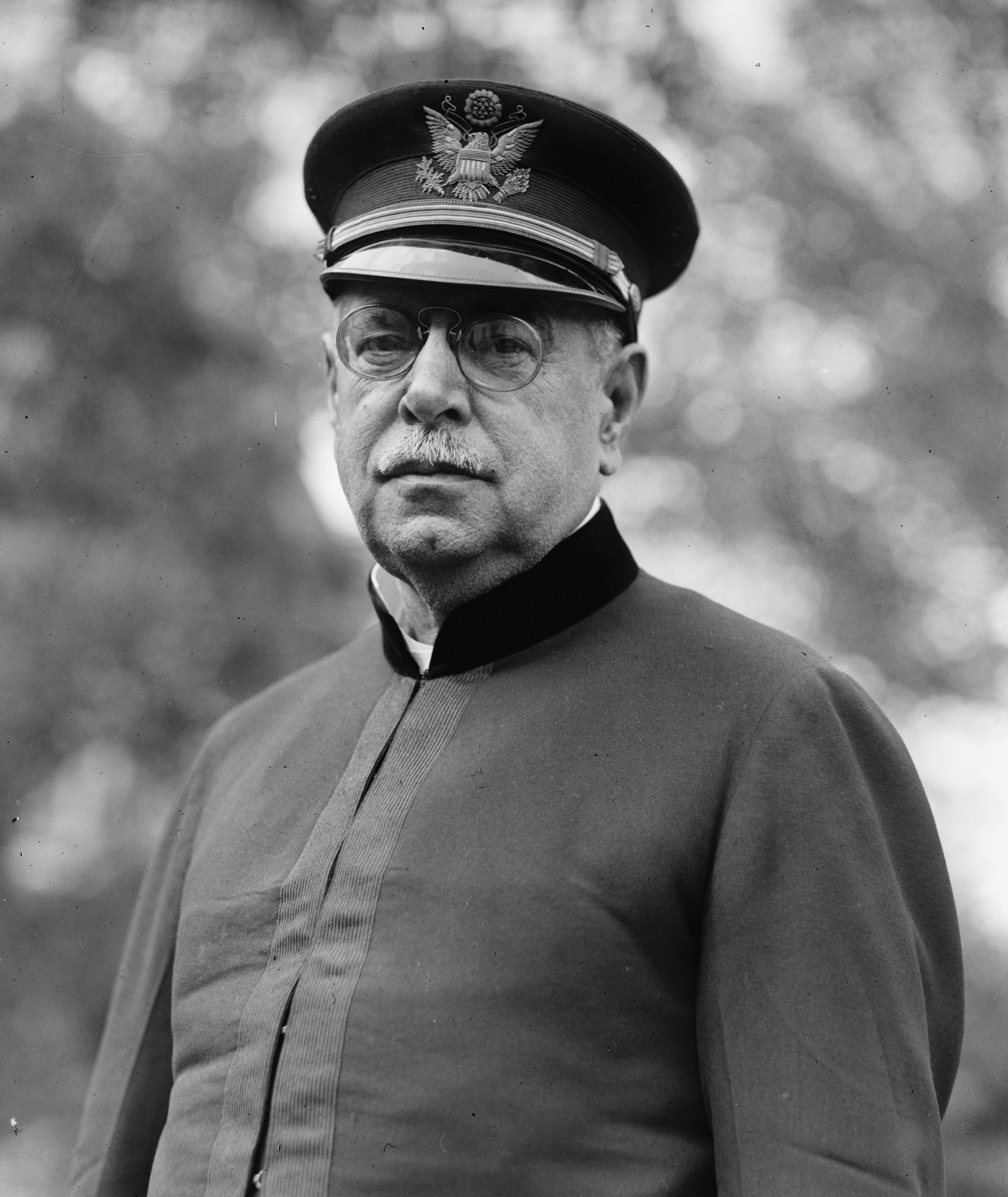
John Philip Sousa

In 1901, the Sousa Band took a tour of England. On December 1, 1901, at Sandringham House, Sousa and his band played a command performance in honor of Queen Alexandra’s birthday. After the performance, in a conversation with the royal family, Sousa "requested and received permission" to dedicate a march to King Edward VII. Edward became king eleven months prior, following the death of his mother Queen Victoria in January. On December 2, the day after the concert, King Edward decorated Sousa with the Medal of the Royal Victorian Order. Sousa's tour was mildly caricatured in Harper's Weekly as the "American invasion, or rag time at the Court of St. James."

The first draft of "Imperial Edward" was finished in April 1902 while Sousa was on vacation in Hot Springs, Virginia, and the march was premiered by the Sousa band on May 21, 1902 during a concert in Montreal. "Imperial Edward" was published by John Church Company, Cincinnati, in 1902. The cover of the John Church sheet music states that the march is "Respectfully dedicated by special permission to His Most Gracious Majesty Edward VII." John Church Company also created what has been described as a "beautiful" illuminated manuscript of the march. This illuminated manuscript was brought to England by George Frederick Hinton, manager of the Sousa Band, and is currently held at the British Museum. Sousa would meet Edward VII again in 1903, when he undertook another command performance at Windsor Castle on January 31. Beginning at 10 PM, this concert was attended by the royal family in addition to "several foreign dignitaries" and the band of the Scots Guards, who were invited by King Edward to attend Sousa's performance. "Imperial Edward" was among the pieces performed, along with "El Capitan," "Hands Across the Sea," “The Stars and Stripes Forever,” and "God Save the King."

"Imperial Edward" has been performed twice at The Proms in London, in September 1903 and August 1904; on both occasions the performances were at Queen's Hall in Langham Place, later destroyed in 1941 during the Blitz. Sir Henry Wood conducted both performances.

== Sousa's opinion of the march ==
Sousa himself, "for some reason," voiced his unhappiness with "Imperial Edward" nearly twenty-two years after the march was written, in the Sousa Band programs at Willow Grove in 1923. The 1923 Willow Grove program bore the following passage:

I have never written a piece of music that I did not feel the inspiration. I have never turned out but one piece that I consider in any manner mechanical. That was “Imperial Edward,” the march I dedicated to King Edward on my second [sic] command to play before him—and that had to be finished in a hurry. For a part of it I felt an inspiration. For the rest, instead of digging down to the vein of gold, I struck a vein of ashes and used it.

— John Philip Sousa, 1923 Sousa Band programs at Willow Grove

== Musical structure ==
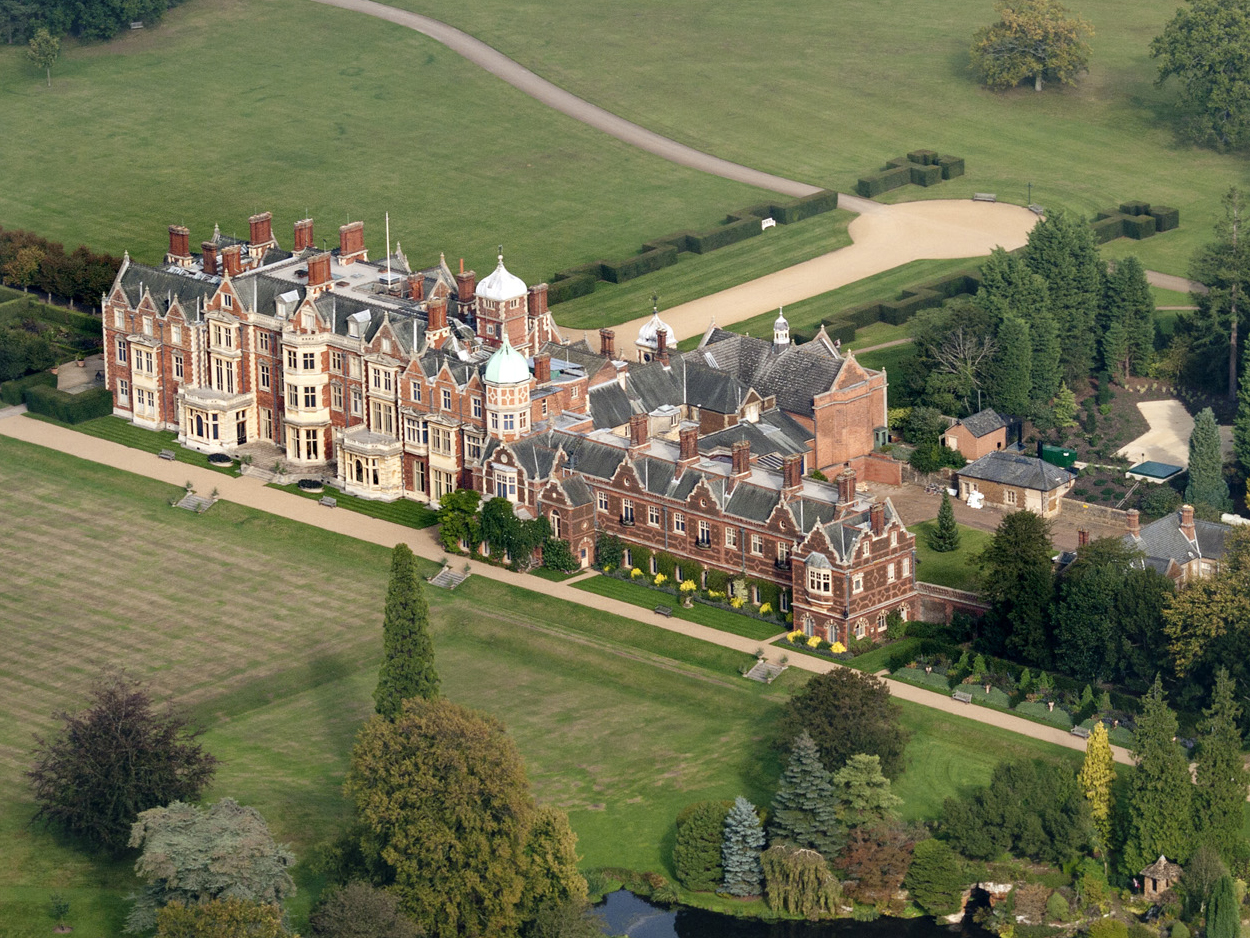
Sandringham House, where Sousa requested and received permission from the royal family to dedicate a march to King Edward VII in 1901

1903 record of the march performed by Sousa's Band by Victor Talking Machine Company

The trio of the march quotes "God Save the King" in a trombone solo. When the Sousa Band performed "Imperial Edward," it was "customary" for the trombone section "to rise...play the brief solo fortissimo, and then be seated."

The U.S. Marine Band has published notes on Sousa's own performance practices for a number of his marches; for "Imperial Edward," the Marine Band performance recommendations are:

For the Introduction (m. 1-8):

The recommended tempo is 118-120 bpm. The accent on beat two of m. 3 should be stronger than the first four half notes of the march and be slightly delayed. The cymbal crashes on the downbeats of m. 5-8 are all choked to leave space for the cornet/trumpet fanfares in those measures.

For the First Strain (m. 8-25):

The pick-up half note to the first strain in m. 8 is usually changed to mezzo-forte from the original fortissimo to allow for a crescendo in the first three measures of the strain. Beat two of m. 11 is the peak of the phrase and is typically followed by a sfz accent in the percussion on the next downbeat. All voices then immediately decrescendo to piano and start the dynamic process over again in the second half of the strain.

For the Second Strain (m. 25-42):

This second strain is typically performed with alterations both times, rather than just the first time. Piccolo, E-flat clarinet, cornets, and trombones and cymbals are tacet both times, and euphonium and tenor saxophone are also tacet the first time only. Clarinets are down one octave form the original both times, and all instruments play at piano with a crescendo to mezzo-forte in m. 38 as indicated. On the repeat, all parts are played exactly the same except for the addition of the countermelody in euphonium and tenor saxophone.

For the Trio (m. 42-74):

This trio is also unusual in its performance practice. Piccolo, E-flat clarinet, cornets, trombones, and cymbals are still tacet at the beginning of the trio, and clarinets remain down the octave. However, in m. 46 and m. 50, cornets and trombones enter for only the four quarter notes indicated, with a poco crescendo, as an answer to the trio melody in the woodwinds. All instruments then re-enter for the crescendo to forte/fortissimo in m. 55-58. The whole scheme then repeats beginning with the subito piano pick-up note in m. 58, and the trombones have a surprise soli statement of “God Save the King” from m. 60-65, which is suddenly played forte over the rest of the band (the trombones may stand for this).

For the Break Strain (m. 74-86):

This short but vigorous break strain ends with a decrescendo in m. 86 leading to a soft statement of the final strain first time through. The cymbal crash in m. 83 should be let to ring all the way to m. 86.

And for the Final Strain (m. 86-103):

A new melody is heard for the first time superimposed over the trio melody. Piccolo, E-flat clarinet, cornets, trombones, and cymbals are tacet first time, and all remaining voices play in piano. The break strain is not repeated in this march; rather, all instruments rejoin on beat two of m. 102 at subito forte and play the last time through the final strain with well-marked articulations. A sffz percussion accent is added in m. 94 second time.

== See also ==
- List of marches by John Philip Sousa
