= Piazzolla (crater) =

Crater on Mercury

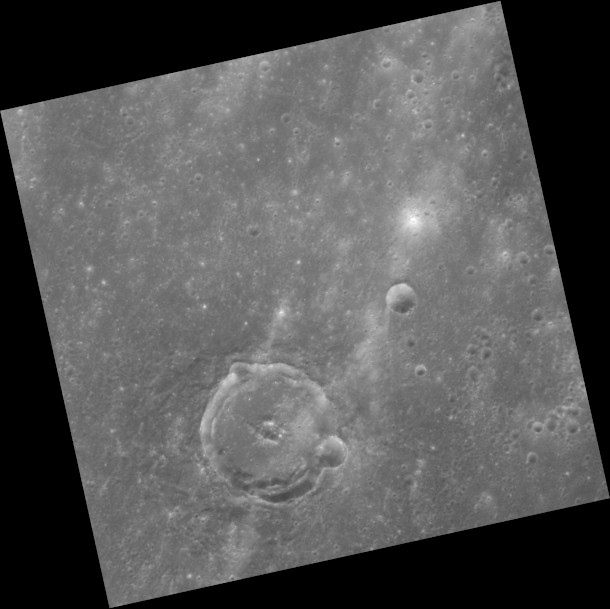
- MESSENGER WAC
- Planet: Mercury
- Coordinates: 34.38°N 0.42°W
- Quadrangle: Victoria
- Diameter: 38 km (24 mi)
- Eponym: Astor Piazzolla

Piazzolla is a crater on Mercury. Its name was adopted by the International Astronomical Union (IAU) on August 13, 2024, for the Argentine tango composer and bandoneon player Astor Piazzolla, who lived from 1921 to 1992.

Piazzolla lies within Borealis Planitia. It is north of Canova and Kyōsai craters and south of Sousa.

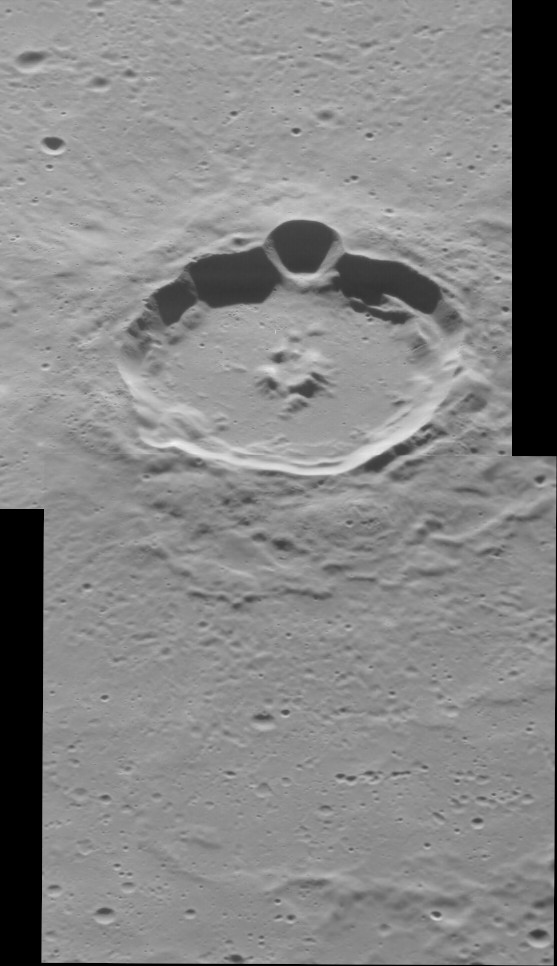
Oblique view looking east
