= The High School Cadets =

High School Cadets
- by John Philip Sousa
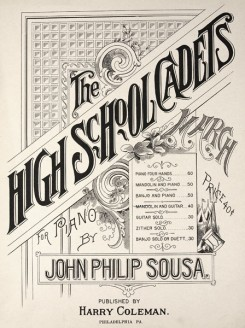
- Form: IAABBCCDD
- Composed: 1890

Audio sample
- "The High School Cadets" as performed by the United States Marine Band.: file; help

"The High School Cadets" is a march written in 1890 by John Philip Sousa in honor of the cadet drill team of Washington High School in the District of Columbia. It is in regimental march form (I-AA-BB-CC-DD) and is a popular selection for school concert and marching bands, as well as for professional orchestras and bands. The march has been arranged for a wide variety of instruments and ensembles, and has been frequently recorded, including at least two recorded performances by Sousa's own band. The march's final strains were featured in the 1939 film The Under-Pup.

== History ==
In 1888, John Philip Sousa composed The March Past of the National Fencibles, in honor of a renowned militia drill team (Note: Although the National Fencibles was a crack team in the 1880s, their performance deteriorated in the 1890s, and the company was disbanded in 1895) affiliated with the National Guard of the District of Columbia. (Note: Sousa wrote a number of marches in honor of cadet drill teams, including Corcoran Cadets for another D.C. cadet team, and Hands Across the Sea, dedicated to the Virginia Tech Corps of Cadets.) In 1890, the rival drill team of the Washington High School (subsequently Washington Central) asked Sousa, a native of the District, to compose a march for them, and he obliged with The High School Cadets March, now generally known simply as High School Cadets. High School Cadets quickly became one of Sousa's most popular marches. Just four years after its composition, the Nebraska State Journal listed it as one of the composer's "most notable" marches, along with Washington Post March, Liberty Bell March, and several others. It was recorded by Sousa's Grand Concert Band around 1899 and has been frequently recorded ever since (see Recordings).

The march was published in 1890 by Philadelphia music publisher Harry Coleman in arrangements for band, for piano solo and for several other small instrumental ensembles.(see Arrangements.) Subsequently, the copyright was picked up by Carl Fischer Music of New York, which continues to list the march in its catalog, both in the original form and in a modern arrangement. The copyright on the original score was renewed by Sousa in 1918; it has now expired and the work is in the public domain in the United States. (Note: Although the original score is now in the public domain, most arrangements and modern recordings of High School Cadets are still under copyright protection.)

High School Cadets continues to be frequently performed, both by professional ensembles and by amateur and school bands. (See External links.)

== Musical structure & instrumentation ==
High School Cadets is in the form of a regimental march, consisting of four repeated musical strains with a short introduction: I-AA-BB-CC-DD. (Note: The other common march form is the military march, which does not use a fourth (D) strain, but recapitulates the trio (C) once or twice, separating the repeats with what is known as a breakstrain: I-AA-BB-C-Br-C-Br-C.) An alternate form plays all four strains without repeats, and then recapitulates the whole march (minus the introduction): I-ABCD-ABCD. This variant is popular with marching bands and was also used by the Edison Military Band in their 1907 recording. (see Recordings)

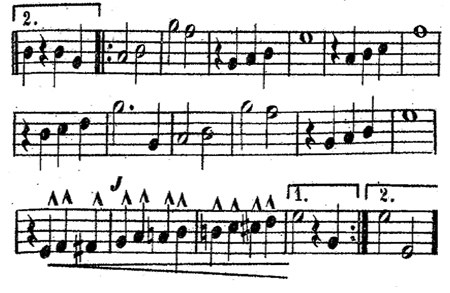
Second (B) strain of High School Cadets, 1st Cornet part.

Each strain is 16 bars in length except the A strain, which is 24 bars long. The A theme, in D-flat major, is "an energetic, somewhat jaunty creation, punctuated by crescendos and exuding a sense of tension... more from happy excitement than from stress or agitation." The second strain derives uplift from the repeated motif of a three-note rising scale, and it ends with a complete ascending chromatic scale (see illustration). The C strain is "a quiet and sonorous trio in G-flat," while the D strain returns to the three-note rising scale motif, with almost every note in the whole strain accented. Conductor Frederick Fennell describes the D theme as:

some of the most wide-open, free-swinging band music I know. Sousa's use of the trombones to intone the first three notes only and then other fragments of the melody while the rest of the tune keepers carry on with the melody makes all the difference.

The use of trombones to emphasize selected elements of melody, as mentioned by Fennell, is characteristic of Sousa's scoring throughout his career. But in certain other respects, the instrumentation of High School Cadets displays its place in the evolution of the composer's ideas about scoring. This march makes use of alto and bass clarinets, and also of alto, tenor and baritone saxophones – all instruments seldom used in Sousa's early works but common in his post-1890 compositions. But the upper brass section consists only of B♭ cornets; the score does not call for either E♭ cornets (used in Sousa's early marches) nor for trumpets (which Sousa began to use after about 1895). High School Cadets is also unusual in having parts for both euphonium and baritone horn; most Sousa compositions include a single part that can be played by either instrument. (Note: Another of the rare marches in which Sousa employs both instruments is Corcoran Cadets, also written in 1890.) The fact that the score includes parts for tympani and orchestral bells suggests that Sousa conceived High School Cadets not simply as a piece for marching band, but for concert band as well.

== Arrangements ==
The original edition of High School Cadets, as published in 1890 by Harry Coleman, included arrangements for band and also for:

- piano solo
- piano & mandolin
- piano & banjo
- mandolin & guitar
- guitar solo
- zither solo
- banjo solo

It has also been arranged for:

- accordion (George H. Farnell, 1934)
- accordion (Lloyd Marvin, 1945)
- brass quartet (John Jay Hilfiger, 2010)
- flute solo (www.flutetunes.com)

Modern band arrangements include:

- a historically researched arrangement by Frank Byrne (Wingert-Jones Publications, 1998)
- a concert band arrangement by John Pasternak (JM Publishing, 2014)
- a simplified arrangement by Ralph Ford for beginning band (Belwin Mills Publishing)
- a simplified arrangement by Andrew Balent for intermediate band (Carl Fisher, 2014)

== Recordings ==
Sousa had a poor opinion of recorded music, considering that it would reduce the incentive to play live music and fearing its implications for the intellectual property rights of composers and musicians. However, he recognized the growing public interest in recordings, and despite his personal reservations he allowed his works to be recorded by numerous ensembles including his own band, although he generally declined to attend the recording sessions and designated others to serve as bandleaders for these occasions. High School Cadets proved popular with recording orchestras and bands, both in Sousa's era and in modern times.

=== Historic recordings ===
- recording by Sousa's Grand Concert Band (circa 1899) Columbia Phonograph Co. brown wax cylinder
- recording by Columbia Band (1902) Columbia Phonograph Co. 7 inch disc, 74 rpm
- recording by Edison Military Band (1907) Edison Gold Molded Cylinder
- recording by Prince's Band (early 1900s) Victor
- recording by Victor Military Band (1911) Victor 35208 12 inch disc, 78 rpm
- recording by Conway's Band (1921) Edison Blue Amberol cylinder #4316 (also issued as disc #7296)
- recording by Sousa's Band, Nathaniel Shilkret conductor (1923) Victor 19064 10 inch disc 78 rpm

=== Representative modern recordings ===
- recording by Eastman Wind Ensemble, Frederick Fennell conductor, from album Sound Off! (1960) Mercury Records
- recording by Cincinnati Pops Orchestra, Erich Kunzel conductor, from album Peaches and Cream (1984) Vox Cum Laude Records
- recording by Boston Pops Orchestra, Arthur Fiedler conductor, from album Sousa Marches (1985) RCA Camden Records
- recording by USAF Heritage of America Band, Lt.Col. Lowell E. Graham conductor, from album Sousa (1995) Klavier Records

== References in popular culture ==
The final portion of the march (one apiece of the C and D strains) was used for the melody of "The March of the Penguins" in Gloria Jean's 1939 film, The Under-Pup. (see External links)

Gloria Jean also sang the tune as a solo in the follow-up film, A Little Bit of Heaven.

Themes from High School Cadets and from Sousa's The Thunderer form the basis of an arrangement by Robert W. Smith & Michael Story entitled "Sousa Times Twosa".

High School Cadets is a popular selection in competitions for school marching bands. (see External links)

== See also ==
- List of marches by John Philip Sousa
