= King Cotton (march) =

March by John Philip Sousa

King Cotton
John Philip Sousa's "King Cotton", which was composed in 1895, being performed by the United States Marine Band

King Cotton is a military march composed in 1895 by John Philip Sousa, for the Cotton States and International Exposition (1895).

The expression "King Cotton" in general refers to the historically high importance of cotton as a cash crop in the southern United States.

The form is as follows; the number of bars is indicated in the parentheses. Intro(4) |:A(16):| |:B(16):| |:Trio(16) Break(16):| Trio Grandioso(16)

The tune is often included in compilations of Sousa's works. It was also included in the musical soundtrack (though not the soundtrack album) as carousel music in the 1973 film, The Sting.

The tune is also featured in the film The Adventures of Milo and Otis as background music. It is also featured in "Emanuelle Goes to Dinosaur Land", an episode of the American television show 30 Rock. In "Superman III", the tune is played as Superman is welcomed by the town of Smallville.

== See also ==
- List of marches by John Philip Sousa
