= The Dauntless Battalion =

American Military March from 1922

- by John Philip Sousa
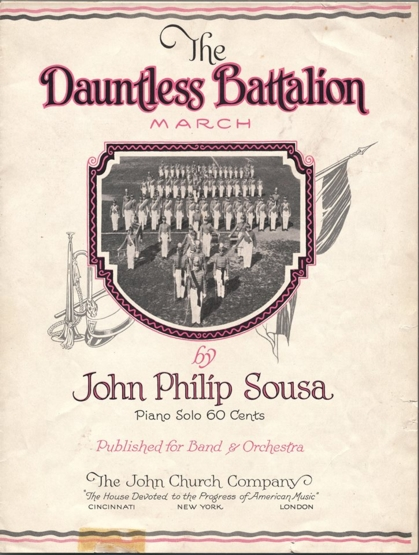
- Year: 1922
- Dedication: “To Col. (Charles E.) Hyatt, the Faculty and Cadets of the Pennsylvania Military College”
- Published: 1922
- Publisher: John Church Company

Audio sample
- United States Marine Band performing the march: file; help

"The Dauntless Battalion" is an American military march by John Philip Sousa, published in 1922 and dedicated to the faculty and cadets of the Pennsylvania Military College (PMC) in Chester, Pennsylvania, known since 1972 as Widener University. Sousa received an honorary Doctor of Music degree from the college in February 1920. Ohio senator and future president Warren G. Harding was also honored with an honorary degree.

In salute to the Pennsylvania Military College cadets, Sousa later composed a march in their honor, dedicating the band score “To Col. (Charles E.) Hyatt, the Faculty and Cadets of the Pennsylvania Military College.” Col. Charles E. Hyatt was president of the college. His son Frank Kelso Hyatt (then Captain) later succeeded him. The march was published by John Church Company.

== History ==
On February 7, 1920, Sousa was awarded an honorary Doctor of Music degree by the Pennsylvania Military College in Chester, Pennsylvania alongside U.S. Senator from Ohio, and soon to be U.S. President, Warren G. Harding.

In the words of music historian Paul E. Bierley, Sousa decided to salute the "cadets in his own inimitable way, by composing a march in their honor." As U.S. Marine Band director Col. Jason K. Fettig described in 2021, he produced a "brilliant new march," and dedicated it to "the commanding officer and students and faculty of the college."

Sousa dedicated the band score: “To Col. (Charles E.) Hyatt, the Faculty and Cadets of the Pennsylvania Military College,” and entitled it “The Pennsylvania Military College March.” There is also an orchestral score entitled “The Pennsylvania Military March.” "By the time the march was published," in the words of Fettig, Sousa had given it "the more colorful title" and his "publisher agreed." The march has also been arranged by Andrew Glover and published by the Theodore Presser Company. Victor Records released the piece as a 78 rpm record in 1923, performed by Sousa's Band.

According to Fettig, by the time the march was published "in 1922 for the public," Sousa's publisher replaced the "rather bland" moniker "The Pennsylvania Military College March,” with its "much catchier title." "Whenever Sousa was honored in a significant way during his long career," Fettig said in 2021, "he often reciprocated the gesture in the best way he knew, to compose a new march for the occasion. Such was the case here."

Sousa and Colonel, later General, Charles E. Hyatt corresponded during 1922 discussing the creation of the new march and on April 2, 1923 Captain Frank Kelso Hyatt wrote a letter thanking Sousa for the dedication of the march to the Pennsylvania Military College."

== Sousa's recording of the march ==
Sousa himself made "only three personal appearances" in recording sessions with the Sousa Band, and "all of them featured newly composed marches." On March 29, 1923, he "conducted his last recording session with his own band," and Dauntless Battalion was one of the pieces performed.

== Musical structure ==
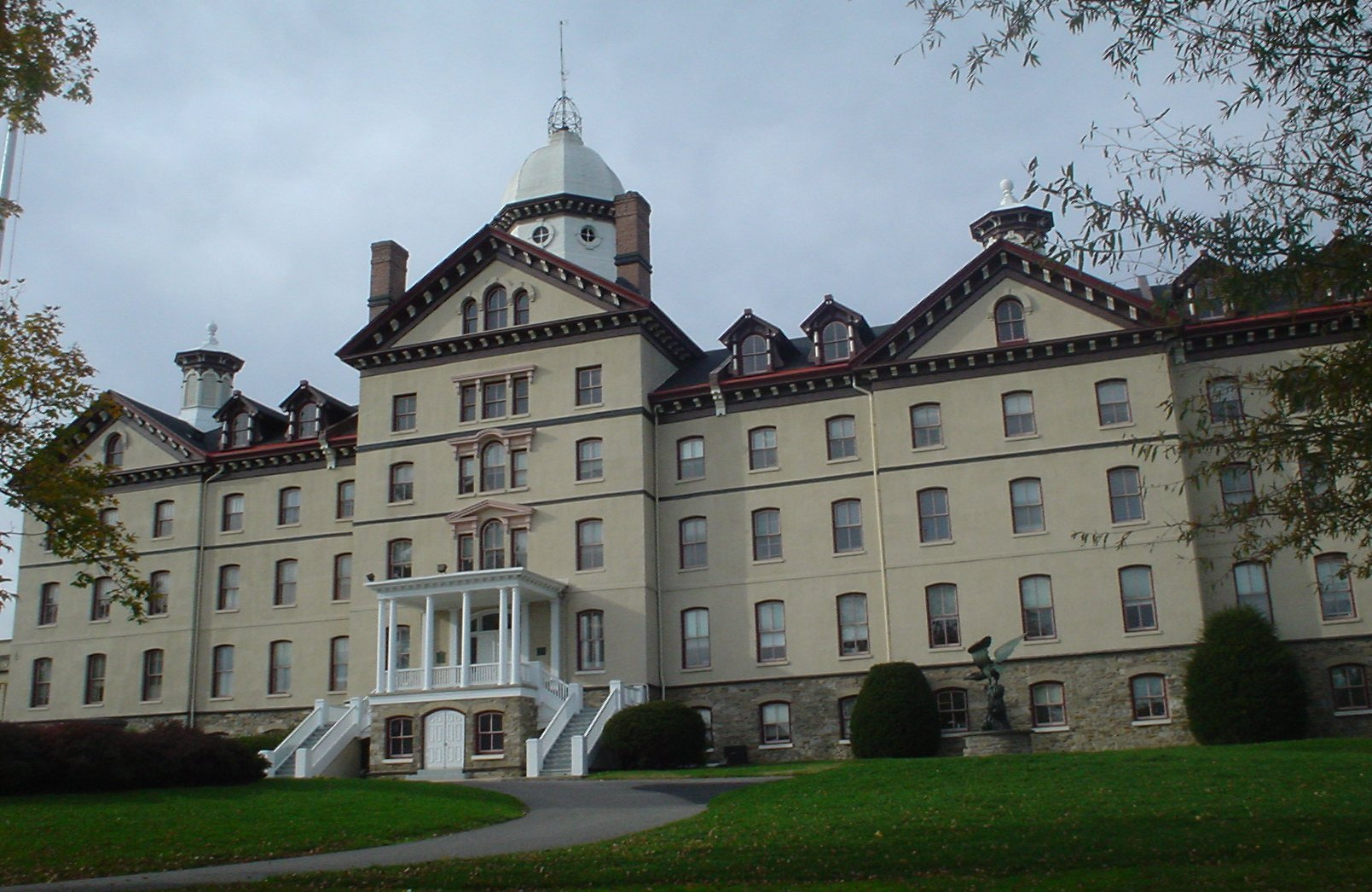
Old Main on the present day Widener University Campus, built in 1867. This building served as primary quarters for the Pennsylvania Military College

In Fettig's words, the march's style "lies somewhere in the middle of Sousa's different approaches," between a composition with a "military character" and one with a "lighter dance style." There is an "added xylophone part that accentuates the cheerful melody." "True to Sousa's penchant for drama," the march's "trio is repeated as softy as possible, and then followed by a somewhat jolting breakstrain led by the low brass."

The U.S. Marine Band has published notes on Sousa's own performance practices for a number of his marches, "influenced by the work of several outstanding Sousa scholars combined with many decades of Marine Band performance tradition." For "The Dauntless Battalion," the Marine Band performance recommendations are:

For the Introduction (m. 1–4):

The vigorous opening to this march should be played with a full fortissimo and strong accents, noting the dramatic chokes indicted in the cymbal part.

For the First Strain (m. 5–21):

The dynamic drops significantly to mezzo-forte with the pick-up note to the first strain. A musical conversation takes place in this strain, led by the indicated dynamic changes every two measures. Along with these dynamic changes, which should be emphasized, the marked articulation changes should follow suit, with the softer sections played leggiero and the louder measures played with more emphasis on the front of the notes.

For the Second Strain (m. 22–39):

Starting with the pick-up notes to m. 22, the first time through the second strain is traditionally played piano, with piccolo, E-flat clarinet, cornets, trombones, and cymbals tacet. Clarinets all play down one octave as indicated. Even at the softer dynamic, there must be good bounce and phrase direction infused throughout this strain. A few subtle dynamic changes have been added to highlight the musical shape of this melody. Accents have been added in the horn parts to emphasize the playful syncopations in the accompaniment. All parts are back in with the pick-up notes in m. 37 and play at the original dynamic of fortissimo for the second time through. Accents are added in the percussion parts in m. 24 and 28, with a stronger sffz on beat 2 of m. 33.

For the Trio (m. 40–57):

Beginning with the pick-up note in m. 39, piccolo, E-flat clarinet, cornets, trombones, and cymbals are tacet once more for the entire trio. The clarinets play down one octave from the original parts as indicated. All play piano for the first strain, and xylophone is traditionally added to the melody with the indicated rolls on long notes. On the repeat of the trio, the dynamic drops further to pianissimo, and saxophone and all percussion except xylophone are now tacet. If desired, the xylophone can be omitted first time and only play on the repeat.

For the Break Strain (m. 58–73):

All instruments are back in with the pick-up note in m. 57 and at the original fortissimo dynamic. The single notes in woodwinds and high brass in m. 58 and 62 have added marcato “caps” on them and should be played short and with a good accent. Note the unique dialogue between rolled snare and bass drum and cymbal solo through this strain. The three cymbal crashes in m. 66, 68, and 70 are added to the original parts but are in keeping with Sousa performance practice. A two-measure diminuendo is added first time going into the final strain.

For the Final Strain (m. 74–91):

Piccolo, E-flat clarinet, cornets, trombones, and cymbals are out once more first time through this last strain, and all others play piano. All instruments are back in at fortissimo for the repeat of the break strain, which is played exactly as before, but this time with a further crescendo in m. 72–73. A poco ritard in these two measures second time through the break strain is permissible to set up the arrival of the last time through the final strain, as long as care is taken to return to tempo at the final strain and through the end of the march. All play tutta forza to the end, with the counterline now sounding in the trombones and added percussion sffz accents in m. 77 and 85, last time only.
