= The Gallant Seventh =

March

The Gallant Seventh
John Philip Sousa's "The Gallant Seventh", which was composed in 1922, being performed by the United States Marine Corps Band

The Gallant Seventh is a march composed by John Philip Sousa in 1922 whilst recovering from a broken neck. The march takes its name from the 7th Regiment of the New York National Guard. The conductor of the Regiment band was Major Francis Sutherland, a former cornetist in Sousa's own civilian band.

Upon America’s entry into World War I, Sutherland left his position with Sousa to enlist in the army; he was made a bandmaster in the U.S. Field Artillery. Sutherland did not return to the Sousa Band at the war’s end, rather accepting the position of bandmaster of the 7th Regiment. The regiment’s commanding officer, Colonel Wade H. Hayes, made a formal request of Sousa for a march. For the premiere of the march at the New York Hippodrome on November 5, 1922, Sutherland’s 7th Regiment Band augmented the Sousa Band on stage.

== Instrumentation ==
The Gallant Seventh is scored for piccolo, flutes, oboes, clarinets (alto, soprano, bass), bassoons, saxophones (soprano, alto, tenor, baritone), cornets in E♭ and B♭, fanfare trumpets, horns in F, euphonium, trombones (tenor, bass), tuba and percussion.

== See also ==
- List of marches by John Philip Sousa
