= John Philip Sousa =

American composer and conductor (1854–1932)

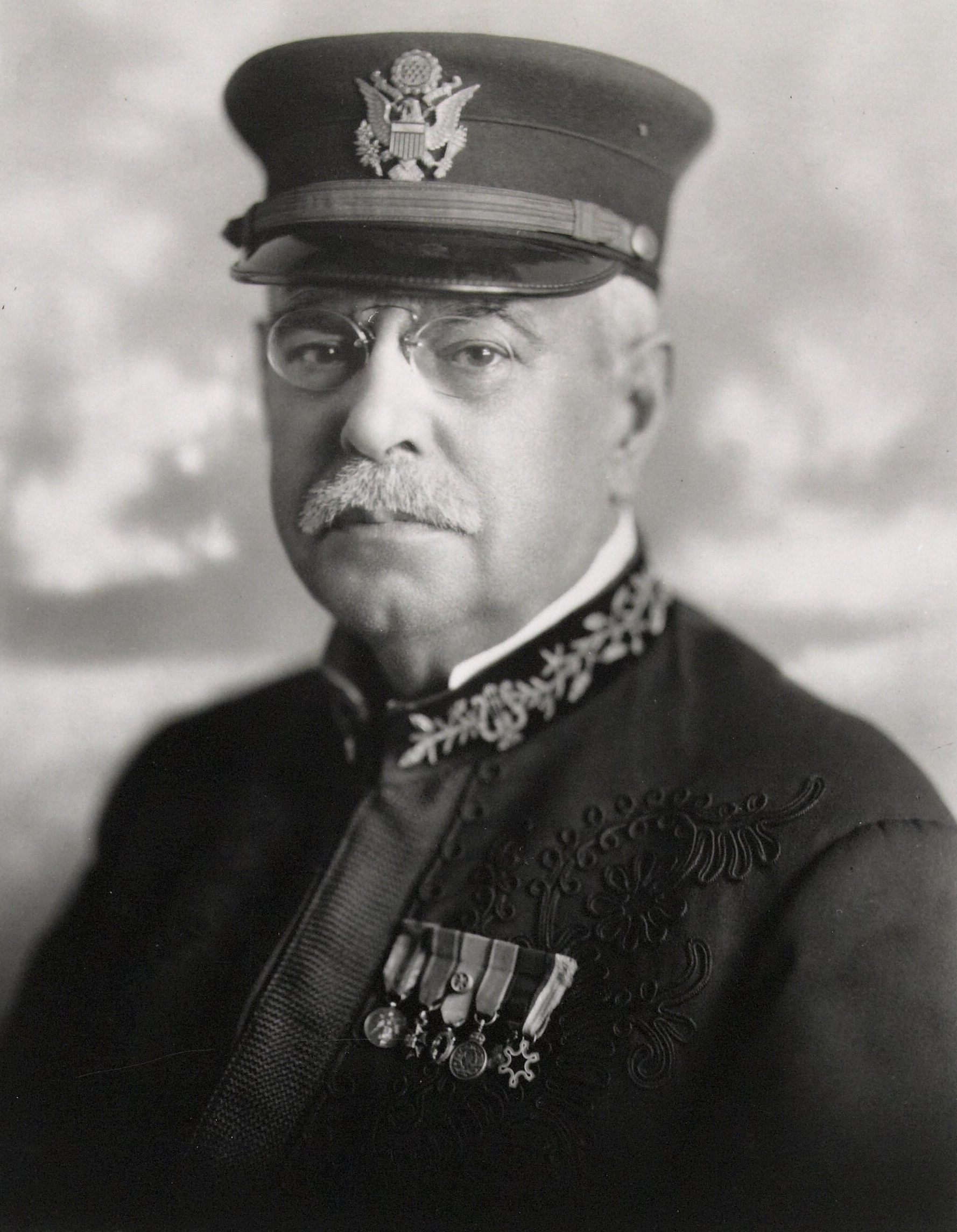
- Sousa in 1922
- Born: November 6, 1854; Washington, D.C., US
- Died: March 6, 1932 (aged 77); Reading, Pennsylvania, US
- Burial place: Congressional Cemetery
- Other name: "The (American) March King"
- Known for: Composing military marches; Helping develop the sousaphone
- Notable work: Full list
- Spouse: Jane van Middlesworth Bellis (m. 1879)
- Children: 3
- Military career
- Branch: United States Marine Corps; United States Navy
- Service years: 1868–1875, 1880–1892 (USMC); 1917–1918 (USN)
- Rank: Sergeant major (USMC); Lieutenant commander (USN)
- Commands: United States Marine Band; Great Lakes Naval Station Band
- Awards: Royal Victorian Medal

John Philip Sousa (Note: /ˈsuːzə, ˈsuːsə/ SOO-zə, SOO-sə; Portuguese: [ˈso(w)zɐ]) (November 6, 1854 – March 6, 1932) was an American composer and conductor of the late Romantic era known primarily for US military marches. He is known as "The March King" (or the "American March King" to distinguish him from his British counterpart Kenneth J. Alford). Among Sousa's best-known marches are "The Stars and Stripes Forever" (national march of the US), "Semper Fidelis" (official march of the United States Marine Corps), "The Liberty Bell", "The Thunderer", and "The Washington Post".

Sousa began his career playing violin and studying music theory and composition under John Esputa and George Felix Benkert.

In 1868, Sousa's father enlisted him in the United States Marine Band as an apprentice. Sousa left the band in 1875, and over the next five years, he performed as a violinist and learned to conduct. In 1880, Sousa rejoined the Marine Band and served there for 12 years as director. In 1892, he left the Marine Band and organized the civilian Sousa Band. From 1880 until his death, Sousa focused exclusively on conducting and writing music. He aided in the development of the sousaphone, a form of marching tuba based on the helicon.

Upon the US joining World War I, Sousa was awarded a wartime commission of lieutenant to lead the Naval Reserve Band in Illinois. He thereafter returned to conduct the Sousa Band until his death in 1932. In the 1920s, Sousa was promoted to the permanent rank of lieutenant commander in the naval reserve.

== Early life, family and education ==
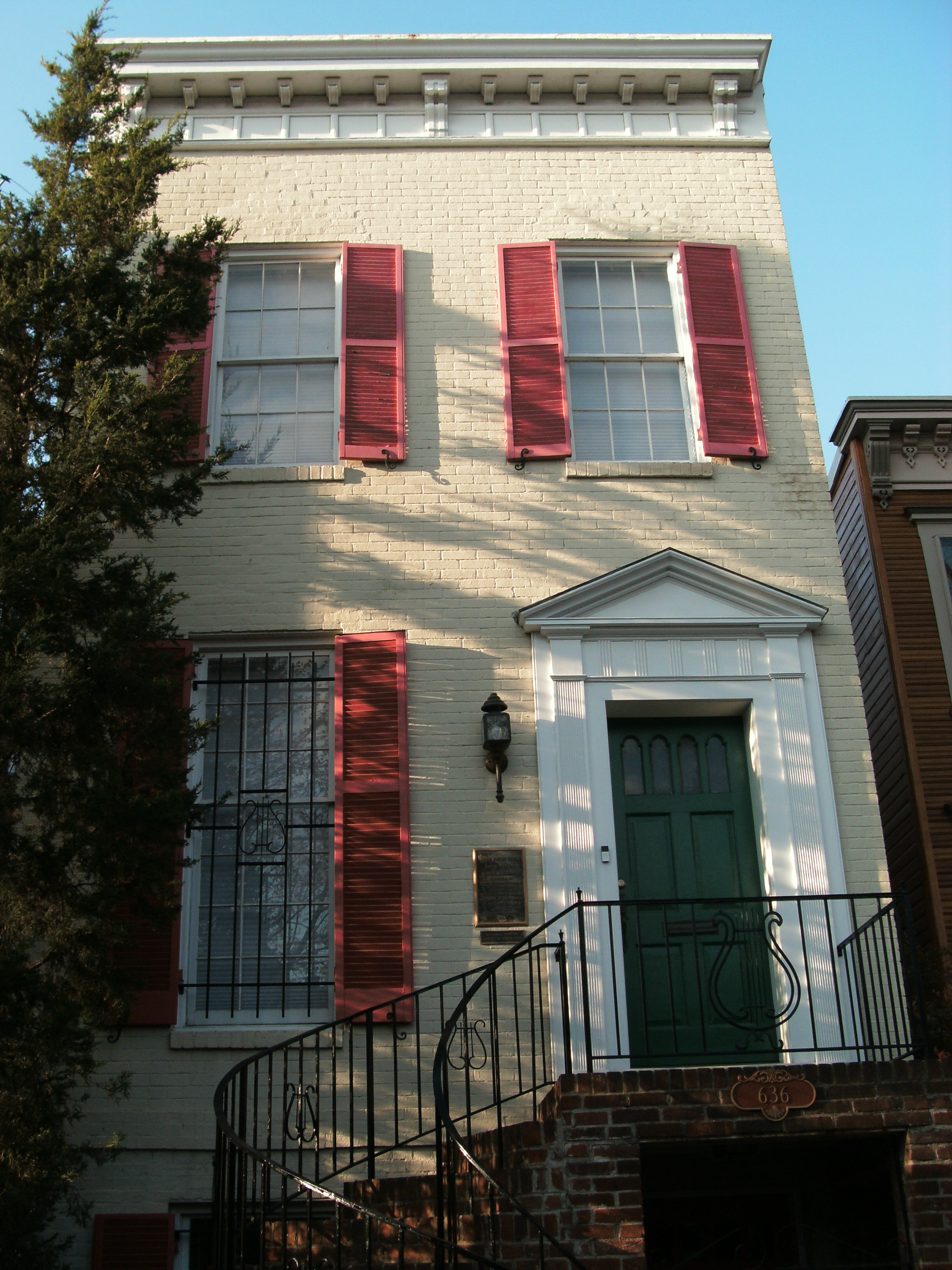
Sousa's birthplace on G St., S.E. in Washington, D.C.

John Philip Sousa was born in Washington, D.C., the third of 10 children of João António de Sousa (John Anthony Sousa) (September 22, 1824 – April 27, 1892), who was born in Spain to Portuguese parents, and his wife Maria Elisabeth Trinkaus (May 20, 1826 – August 25, 1908), who was German, from Bavaria. Sousa began his music education under the tutelage of John Esputa Sr., who taught him solfeggio. This was short-lived due to the teacher's frequent bad temper.

Sousa's real music education began in 1861 or 1862 as a pupil of John Esputa Jr., the son of his previous teacher under whom Sousa studied violin, piano, flute, several brass instruments, and singing. Esputa shared his father's bad temper, and the relationship between teacher and pupil was often strained, but Sousa progressed very rapidly and was also found to have perfect pitch. During this period, Sousa wrote his first composition, "An Album Leaf", but Esputa dismissed it as "bread and cheese", and the composition was subsequently lost.

Sousa's father was a trombonist in the Marine Band. He enlisted his son in the United States Marine Corps as an apprentice at age 13 to keep him from joining a circus band. That same year, Sousa began studying music under George Felix Benkert. Because Sousa was enlisted under a minority enlistment, he would not be discharged until his 21st birthday.

== Career ==
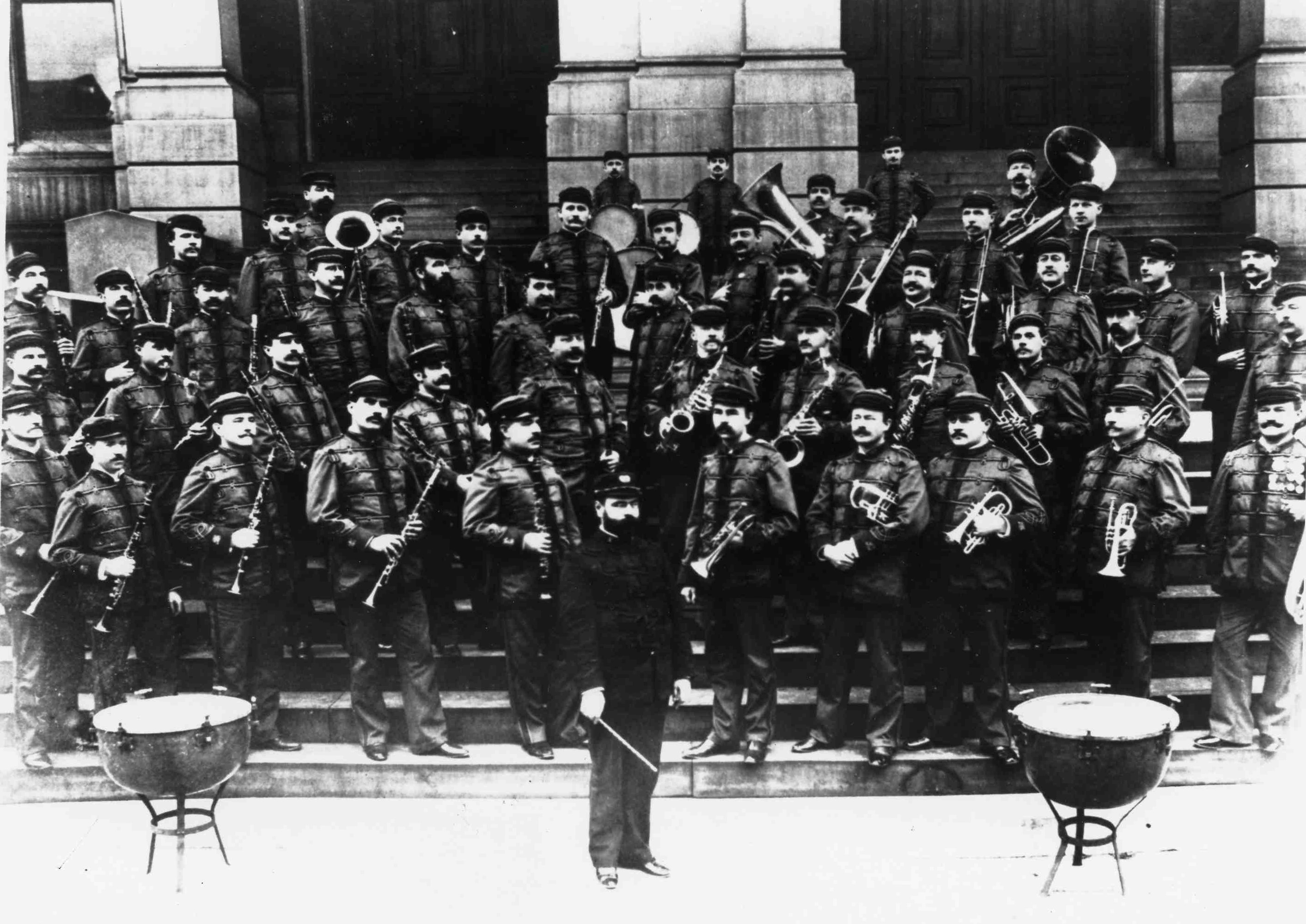
Sousa and his newly formed civilian band in 1893

In 1868, Sousa enlisted in the Marine Corps at age 13 as an apprentice musician (his rank listed as "boy"). Sousa completed his apprenticeship and left the Marine Corps in 1875. He then began performing on the violin and joined a theatrical pit orchestra where he learned to conduct.

Sousa returned to the Marine Band as its head in 1880 and remained as its conductor until 1892. During this period, he led the Marine Band through its development into the country's premier military band. Under Sousa, the band's repertoire and instrumentation focused more on symphonic music, with more rigorous rehearsals. He led "The President's Own" band under five presidents from Rutherford B. Hayes to Benjamin Harrison. Sousa's band played at the inaugural balls of James A. Garfield in 1881 and Benjamin Harrison in 1889.

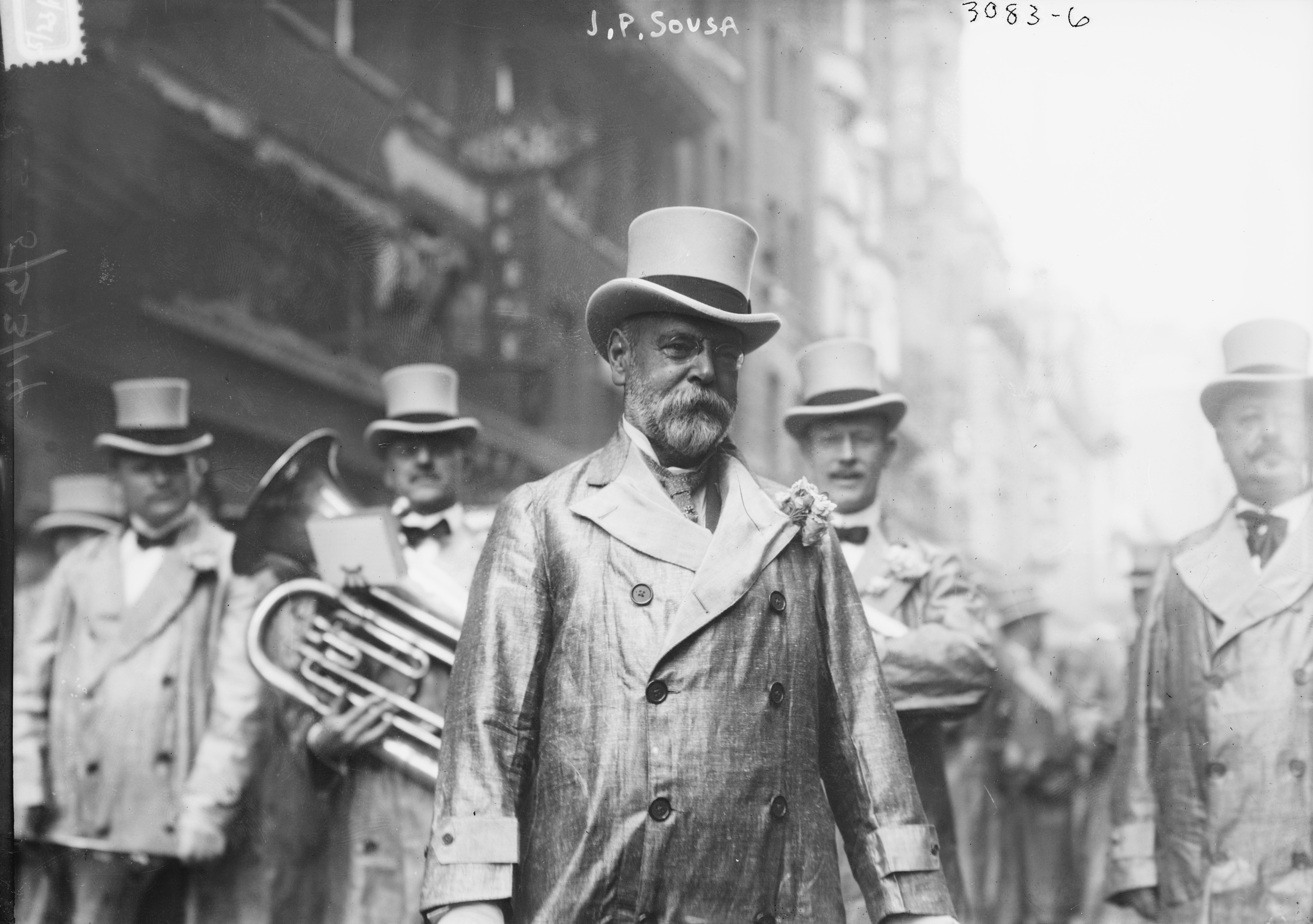
Sousa c. 1910

In July 1892, Sousa requested a discharge from the Marine Corps to pursue a financially promising civilian career as a band leader. Sousa organized The Sousa Band the year that he left the Marine Band, and it toured from 1892 to 1931 and performed at 15,623 concerts, both in the United States and internationally, including at the World Exposition in Paris and at the Royal Albert Hall in London. Jascha Gurewich, an early popularizer of the saxophone in the concert hall, was soloist for Sousa's band in the early 1920s. In Paris, the Sousa Band marched through the streets to the Arc de Triomphe, one of only eight parades that the band marched in during its 40 years.

"The Washington Post"
The United States Marine Band performs "The Washington Post"

Sousa was commissioned as a lieutenant in the Naval Reserve on May 31, 1917, shortly after the United States declared war on Germany and entered World War I. He was 62 years old, the mandatory retirement age for Navy officers. During the war, Sousa led the Navy Band at the Great Lakes Naval Station near Chicago, and he donated all of his naval salary except a token $1 per month to the Sailors' and Marines' Relief Fund. In 1918, Sousa and Walter Damrosch authored an arrangement of "The Star-Spangled Banner" on behalf of the U.S. Bureau of Education, becoming the basis of most subsequent performances of the song today.

Sousa was discharged from active duty after the end of the war in November 1918 and returned to conducting his own band. In the early 1920s, Sousa was promoted to lieutenant commander in the Naval Reserve but did not return to active duty. He frequently wore his Navy uniform during performances for the remainder of his life.

For his service during the war, Sousa received the World War I Victory Medal and was elected as a Veteran Companion of the Military Order of Foreign Wars. He was also a member of the New York Athletic Club and Post 754 of the American Legion.

== Personal life ==
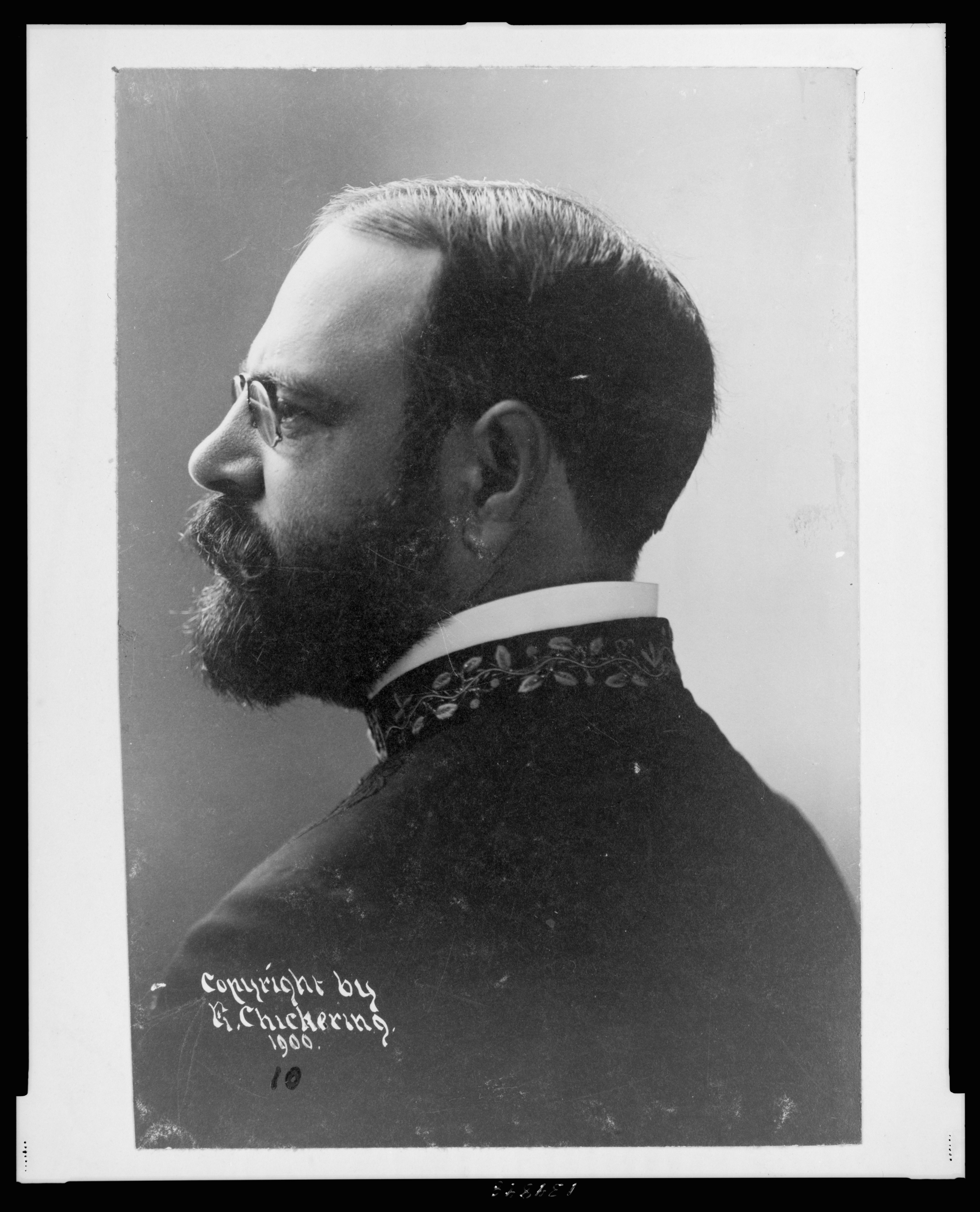
Sousa in 1900

On December 30, 1879, Sousa married Jane van Middlesworth Bellis (February 22, 1862 – March 11, 1944), who was descended from Adam Bellis who served in the New Jersey troops during the American Revolutionary War. They had three children: John Jr. (April 1, 1881 – May 18, 1937), Jane Priscilla (August 7, 1882 – October 28, 1958), and Helen (January 21, 1887 – October 14, 1975).

On July 15, 1881, Sousa was initiated into Freemasonry by Hiram Lodge No. 10 (Now Hiram-Takoma Lodge No. 10) in Washington, D.C., where he remained an active member until his death in 1932. Among other Masonic honors, Sousa was named the Honorary Band Leader of the Temple Band of Almas Shriners, the DC-based Chapter of Shriners International. A number of his compositions were for the organization, including the "Nobles of the Mystic Shrine" March.

In his later years, Sousa lived in Sands Point, New York. On March 6, 1932, he died of heart failure at age 77 in his room at the Abraham Lincoln Hotel in Reading, Pennsylvania. Sousa had conducted a rehearsal of "The Stars and Stripes Forever" the day before with the Ringgold Band as its guest conductor. Sousa is buried at Congressional Cemetery in Washington, D.C. Every year on November 6, the Marine Band performs Semper Fidelis at Sousa's grave. His house Wildbank has been designated as a National Historic Landmark, although it remains a private home and is not open to the public.

One of Sousa's great-grandsons, John Philip Sousa IV, works as a political activist for the Republican Party.

== Honors ==
Sousa was decorated with the palms of the Order of Public Instruction of Portugal and the Order of Academic Palms of France. He also received the Royal Victorian Medal from King Edward VII of the United Kingdom in December 1901 for conducting a private birthday concert for Queen Alexandra.

In 1922, Sousa accepted the invitation of the national chapter to become an honorary member of Kappa Kappa Psi, the national honorary band fraternity. In 1932, he was initiated as an honorary member of Phi Mu Alpha Sinfonia, a national fraternity for men in music, by the fraternity's Alpha Xi chapter at the University of Illinois.

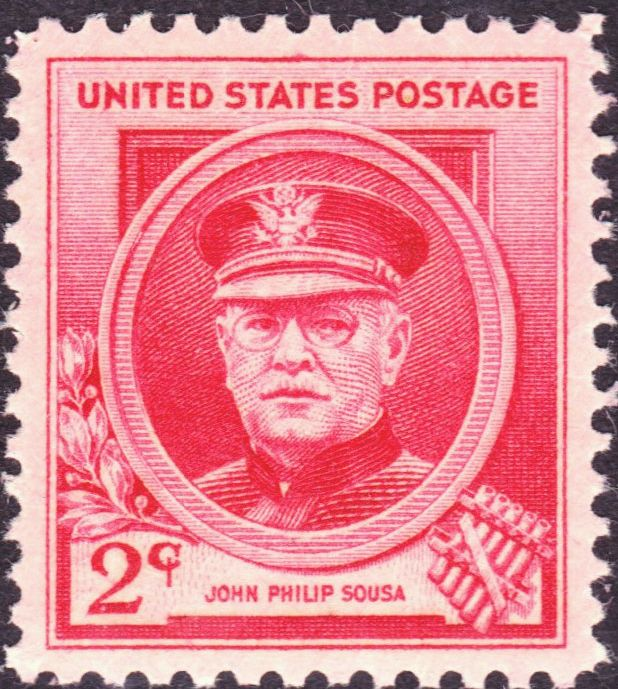
US Postage stamp, 1940

The World War II Liberty ship SS John Philip Sousa was named in Sousa's honor. The Marine Band possesses the ship's bell, using it in performances of the "Liberty Bell March".

In 1952, 20th Century Fox honored Sousa in their Technicolor feature film Stars and Stripes Forever with Clifton Webb portraying him. It was loosely based on Sousa's memoirs Marching Along.

In 1987, an act of Congress named "The Stars and Stripes Forever" as the national march of the United States.

In 2012, a crater on the planet Mercury was named in Sousa's honor. He was posthumously enshrined in the Hall of Fame for Great Americans in 1976.

== Memberships ==
Sousa was a member of the Sons of the Revolution, Military Order of Foreign Wars, Freemasons, and the Society of Authors and Composers. He was also a member of the Salmagundi, Players, Musicians, New York Athletic, and Lambs clubs of New York City and the Army and Navy and the Gridiron clubs of Washington.

== Music ==
"Semper Fidelis"
Sousa's "Semper Fidelis", the official march of the United States Marine Corps, performed by the U.S. Marine Band in June 1909.

"The Stars and Stripes Forever"
The United States Marine Band performs "The Stars and Stripes Forever", the national march of the United States

The Gladiator March
"The Gladiator March", Sousa's first hit.

King Cotton
"King Cotton", an 1895 Sousa military march.

The Gallant Seventh
"The Gallant Seventh", was in the 1920s and is distinguished as his only march with two breakstrains.

The Thunderer
Sousa's "The Thunderer" (1889), performed in 1896 by the United States Marine Band

Manhattan Beach
"Manhattan Beach", a commemorative march by John Philip Sousa.

Hands Across the Sea
Sousa's "Hands Across the Sea" (1899), performed by the United States Navy Band

The Fairest of the Fair
Sousa's "Fairest of the Fair" (1908), performed by the United States Navy Band

The Minnesota March
"The Minnesota March" (1927), performed by the United States Marine Band.

"The Star-Spangled Banner" (1918 arrangement by J.S. Sousa and W.J. Damrosch)
Sousa and Walter Damrosch's 1918 arrangement of the "The Star-Spangled Banner" being performed by the United States Military Academy Band in 2000.

Sousa wrote over 130 marches, 15 operettas, 5 overtures, 11 suites, 24 dances, 28 fantasies, and countless arrangements of nineteenth-century western European symphonic works.

=== Marches ===
Sousa wrote over 130 marches, published by Harry Coleman of Philadelphia, Carl Fischer Music, the John Church Company, and the Sam Fox Publishing Company, the last association beginning in 1917 and continuing until his death. Some of his more well-known marches include:

- "Review" (1873) (Sousa's first published march)
- "The Gladiator March" (1886)
- "Semper Fidelis" (1888) (Official March of the United States Marine Corps)
- "The Washington Post" (1889)
- "The Thunderer" (1889)
- "The Loyal Legion March" (1890)
- "High School Cadets" (1890)
- "The Liberty Bell" (1893) (later used as the credits theme for Monty Python's Flying Circus TV series)
- "Manhattan Beach March" (1893)
- "King Cotton" (1895)
- "Stars and Stripes Forever" (1896) (National March of the United States)
- "El Capitan" (1896)
- "Hands Across the Sea" (1899)
- "Hail to the Spirit of Liberty" March (1900)
- "The Invincible Eagle" (1901) (dedicated to Pan-American Buffalo Exposition) (Interim United States Space Force Anthem)
- "Imperial Edward" March (1902) Dedicated to King Edward VII of the United Kingdom
- "Fairest of the Fair" (1908)
- "Glory of the Yankee Navy" (1909)
- "Columbia's Pride" (1914)
- "U.S. Field Artillery" (1917) (modified version "The Army Goes Rolling Along" is the official song of the U.S. Army)
- "Anchor & Star" (1918) Dedicated "To the U.S. Navy"
- "Who's Who in Navy Blue" (1920) (composed at the request of the United States Naval Academy class of 1920 and dedicated to Tamanend, a bronze reproduction of the figurehead of USS Delaware that occupies a key place at the Academy)
- "The Gallant Seventh" (1922)
- "The Dauntless Battalion" (1922) Dedicated "To Col. Hyatt, the Faculty and Cadets of the Pennsylvania Military College" (Now Widener University in Chester, PA)
- "Nobles of the Mystic Shrine" (1923)
- "The Black Horse Troop" (1924) (written in honor of Troop A, 107th Cavalry, Ohio National Guard).
- "Pride of the Wolverines" (1926)
- "The Minnesota March" (1927) Dedicated to "The faculty and students of the University of Minnesota"
- "New Mexico March" (1928)
- "Salvation Army March" (1930) (dedicated to the Salvation Army's 50th anniversary in the U.S.)

Sousa conducts the public premiere of his march "The Royal Welch Fusiliers" on May 12, 1930 at the White House

Sousa wrote marches for several U.S. universities, including the University of Minnesota, University of Illinois, University of Nebraska, Kansas State University, Marquette University, Pennsylvania Military College (Widener University), and the University of Michigan.

=== Operettas ===
Sousa wrote many notable operettas, including:

- Désirée (1883), libretto by Edward M. Taber
- El Capitan (1896), libretto by Charles Klein
- The Charlatan (1898), also known as The Mystical Miss, book by Charles Klein and lyrics by Sousa
- Chris and the Wonderful Lamp (1899), libretto by Glen MacDonough

Marches and waltzes have been derived from many of these stage-works. Sousa also composed the music for six operettas that were either unfinished or not produced: The Devils' Deputy, Florine, The Irish Dragoon, Katherine, The Victory, and The Wolf.

In addition, Sousa wrote a march based on themes from Gilbert and Sullivan's comic opera The Mikado, the elegant overture Our Flirtations, several musical suites, etc. He frequently added Sullivan opera overtures or other Sullivan pieces to his concerts.

== Hobbies, writing and recording ==
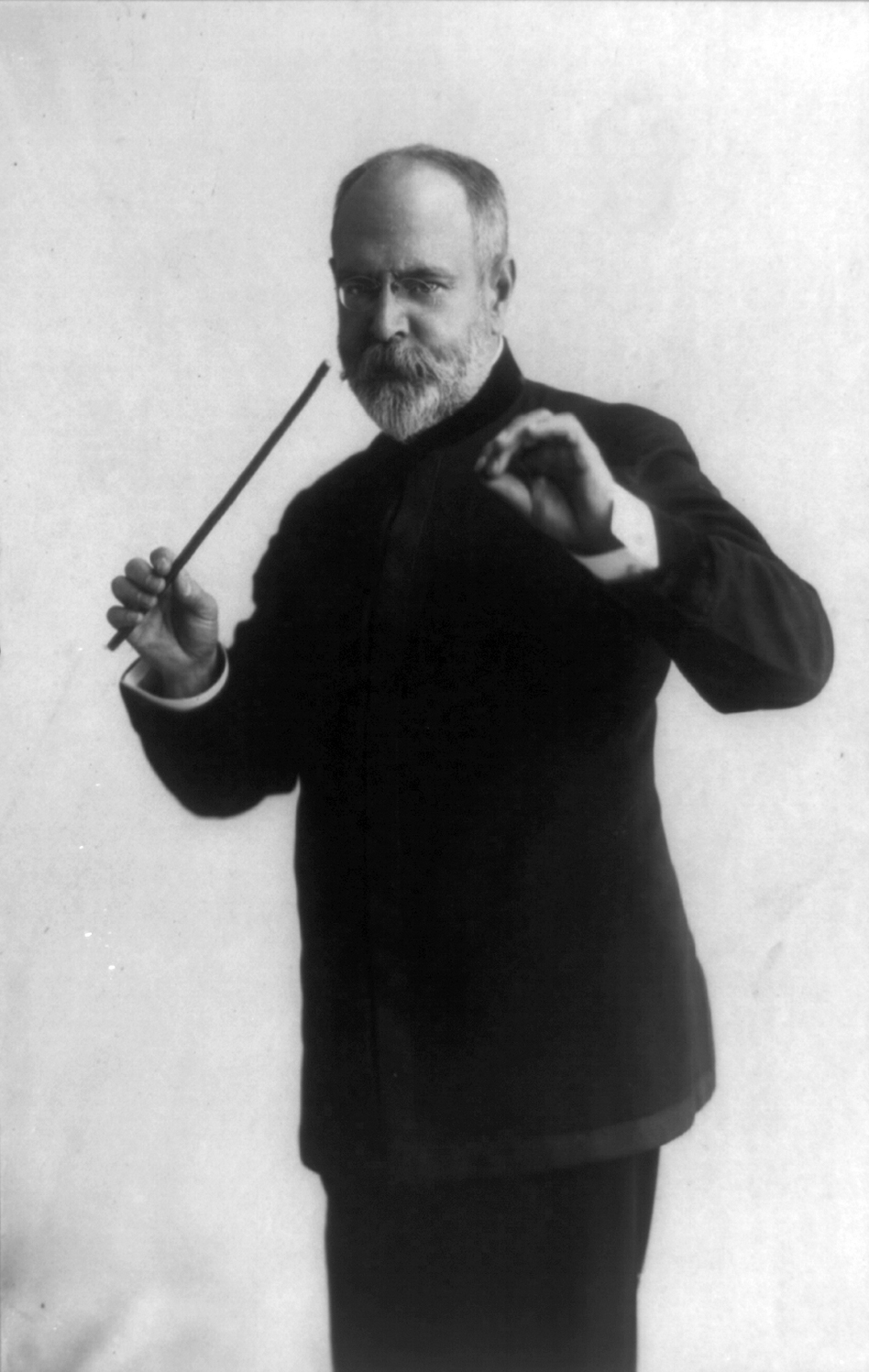
Sousa conducting with a baton, 1911

Sousa ranked as one of the all-time great trapshooters and was enshrined in the Trapshooting Hall of Fame. He organized the first national trapshooting organization, a forerunner to today's Amateur Trapshooting Association (ATA). He also wrote numerous articles about trapshooting. He was a regular competitor representing the Navy in trapshooting competitions, particularly against the Army. Records indicate that Sousa registered more than 35,000 targets during his shooting career. The Trapshooter Hall of Fame quotes him as saying "Let me say that just about the sweetest music to me is when I call, 'pull,' the old gun barks, and the referee in perfect key announces, 'dead'."

In Sousa's 1902 novella The Fifth String, a virtuoso violinist makes a deal with the Devil for a magic violin with five strings. The first four strings excite the emotions of Pity, Hope, Love, and Joy but the fifth string, made from the hair of Eve, will cause the player's death once played. The violinist wins the love of the woman he desires but out of jealous suspicion, she commands him to play the death string, which he does.

In 1905, Sousa published Pipetown Sandy, which includes a satirical poem titled "The Feast of the Monkeys". In 1920, he wrote a 40,000-word story entitled "The Transit of Venus". Sousa also wrote the booklet "A manual for trumpet and drum", published by the Ludwig Drum Company with advice for playing drums and trumpet. An early version of the trumpet solo to "Semper Fidelis" was included in this volume.

The marching brass bass or sousaphone is a modified helicon created in 1893 by Philadelphia instrument maker J. W. Pepper at Sousa's request, using several of his suggestions in its design. Sousa wanted a tuba that could sound upward and over the band whether its player was seated or marching. C.G. Conn recreated the instrument in 1898 and this was the model that Sousa preferred to use.

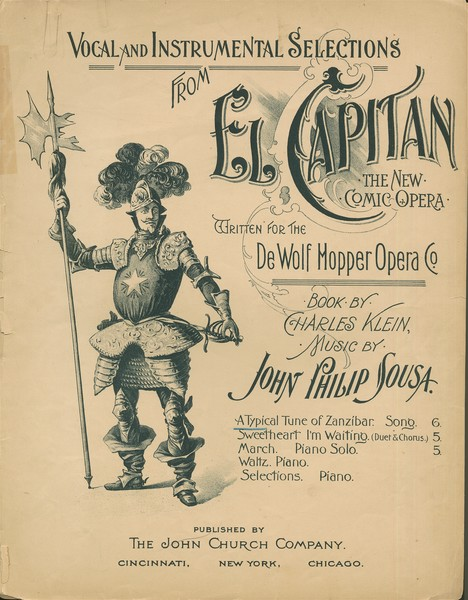
Sheet music cover, 1896

Sousa held a very low opinion of the emerging recording industry. He derided recordings as "canned music", a reference to the early wax cylinder records that came in can-like cylindrical cardboard boxes. He argued to a congressional hearing in 1906:

These talking machines are going to ruin the artistic development of music in this country. When I was a boy... in front of every house in the summer evenings, you would find young people together singing the songs of the day or old songs. Today you hear these infernal machines going night and day. We will not have a vocal cord left. The vocal cord will be eliminated by a process of evolution, as was the tail of man when he came from the ape.

Sousa's antipathy to recording was such that he rarely conducted his band when it was being recorded. Nevertheless, the band made numerous recordings, the earliest being issued on cylinders by several companies, followed by many recordings on discs by the Berliner Gramophone Company and its successor, the Victor Talking Machine Company (later RCA Victor). The Berliner recordings were conducted by Henry Higgins (one of Sousa's cornet soloists) and Arthur Pryor (Sousa's trombone soloist and assistant conductor). Sousa claimed that he had "never been in the gramophone company's office in my life".

Sousa conducted a few of the Victor recordings but most were conducted by Pryor, Herbert L. Clarke, Edwin H. Clarke, Walter B. Rogers (who had also been a cornet soloist with Sousa), Rosario Bourdon, Josef Pasternack, or Nathaniel Shilkret. Details of the Victor recordings are available in the external link below to the EDVR.

After the introduction of electrical recording in 1925 Sousa changed his mind about phonograph records. After a demonstration of the Orthophonic Victrola on October 6, 1925, at the Waldorf-Astoria Hotel he said, "[Gentlemen], that is a band. This is the first time I have ever heard music with any soul to it produced by a mechanical talking machine."

Sousa refused to appear on radio broadcasts for many years, but relented beginning with a 1929 nationwide broadcast.

== John Philip Sousa Award ==
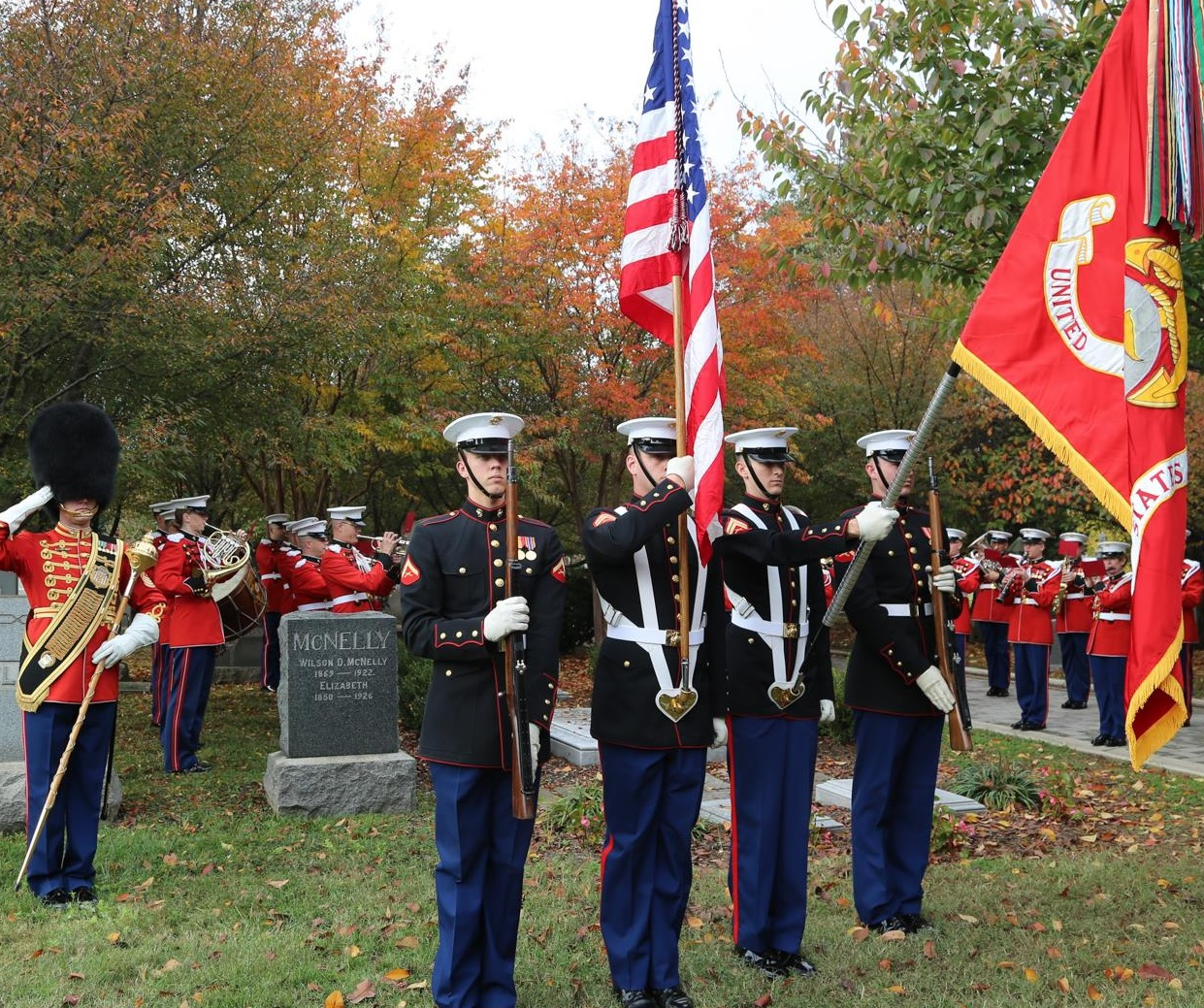
Annual military observances at Sousa's Grave

Even after his death, Sousa continues to be remembered as "The March King" through the John Philip Sousa Foundation. The non-profit organization, founded in 1981, recognizes one superior student in marching band for "musicianship, dependability, loyalty, and cooperation."

The John Philip Sousa Foundation provides awards, scholarships, and projects such as The Sudler Trophy, The Sudler Shield, The Sudler Silver Scroll, The Sudler Flag of Honor, The Historic Roll of Honor, The Sudler Cup, The Hawkins Scholarship, National Young Artists, The National Community Band, and The Junior Honor Band Project. He won many honorable awards across his lifetime.

== George Balanchine's "Stars and Stripes" ==
In 1958, the New York City Ballet premiered George Balanchine's ballet Stars and Stripes, set to "Corcoran Cadets," "Thunder and Gladiator," "Rifle Regiment," Liberty Bell, "El Capitan," and The Stars and Stripes Forever, all orchestrated by Hershy Kay.

== See also ==
- Sousa Archives and Center for American Music
- William Bell (tuba player)
- John Philip Sousa Bridge
- Patrick Gilmore
