= Sousa (crater) =

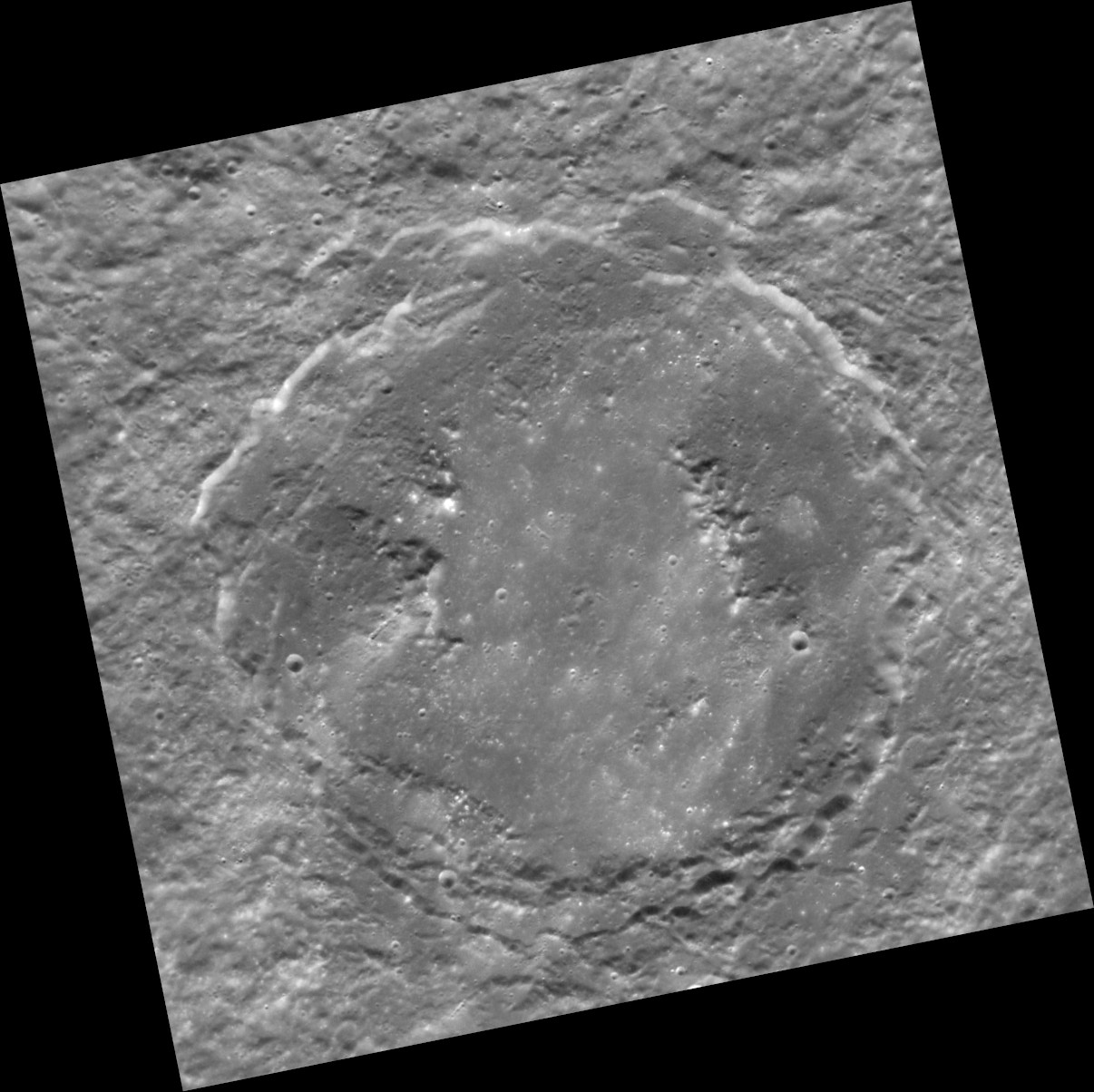
- MESSENGER WAC
- Planet: Mercury
- Coordinates: 46.69°N 359.37°W
- Quadrangle: Hokusai
- Diameter: 138 km (86 mi)
- Eponym: John Philip Sousa

Sousa is a crater on Mercury. Its name was adopted by the International Astronomical Union (IAU) on April 24, 2012. Sousa is named for American bandmaster and composer John Philip Sousa.

Sousa is one of the better preserved of 110 peak ring basins on Mercury.

To the south of Sousa is Piazzolla crater, and to the southwest is Monet.

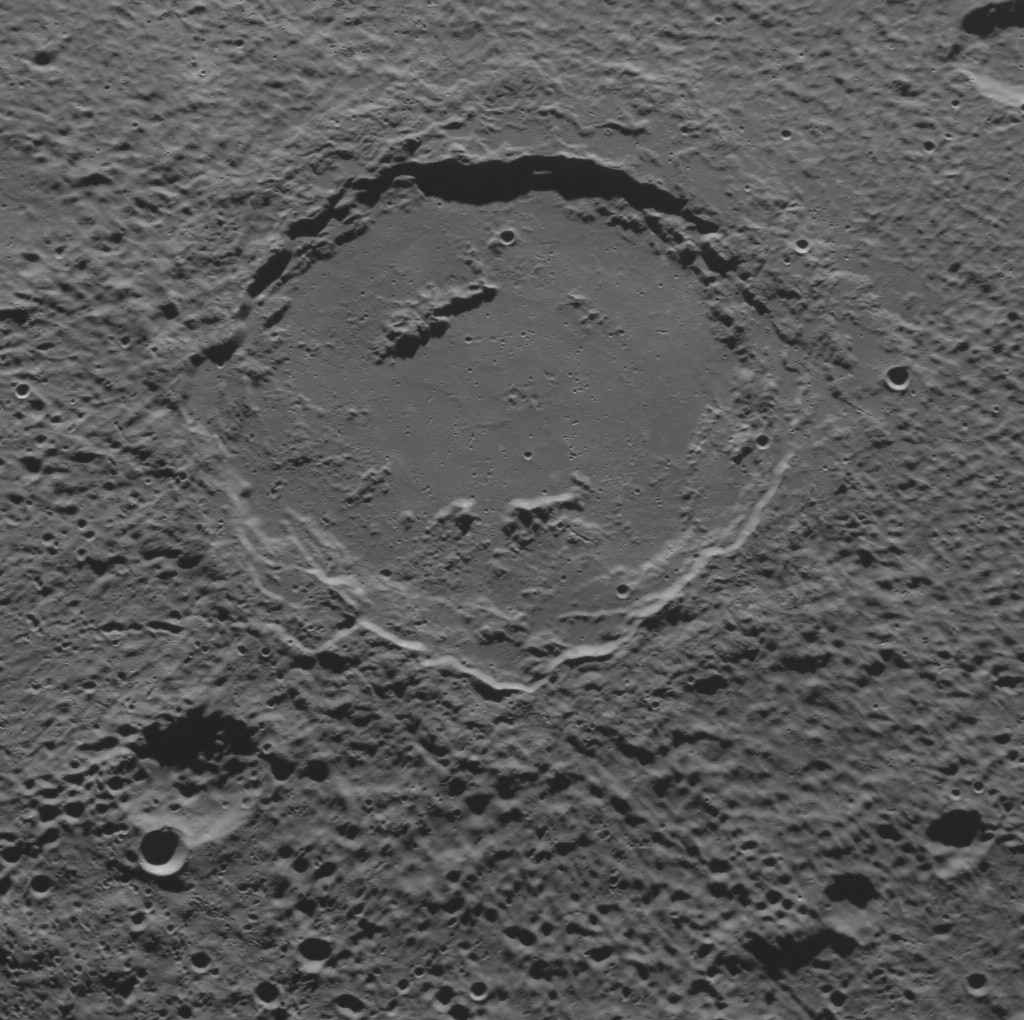
Slightly oblique view at lower sun angle

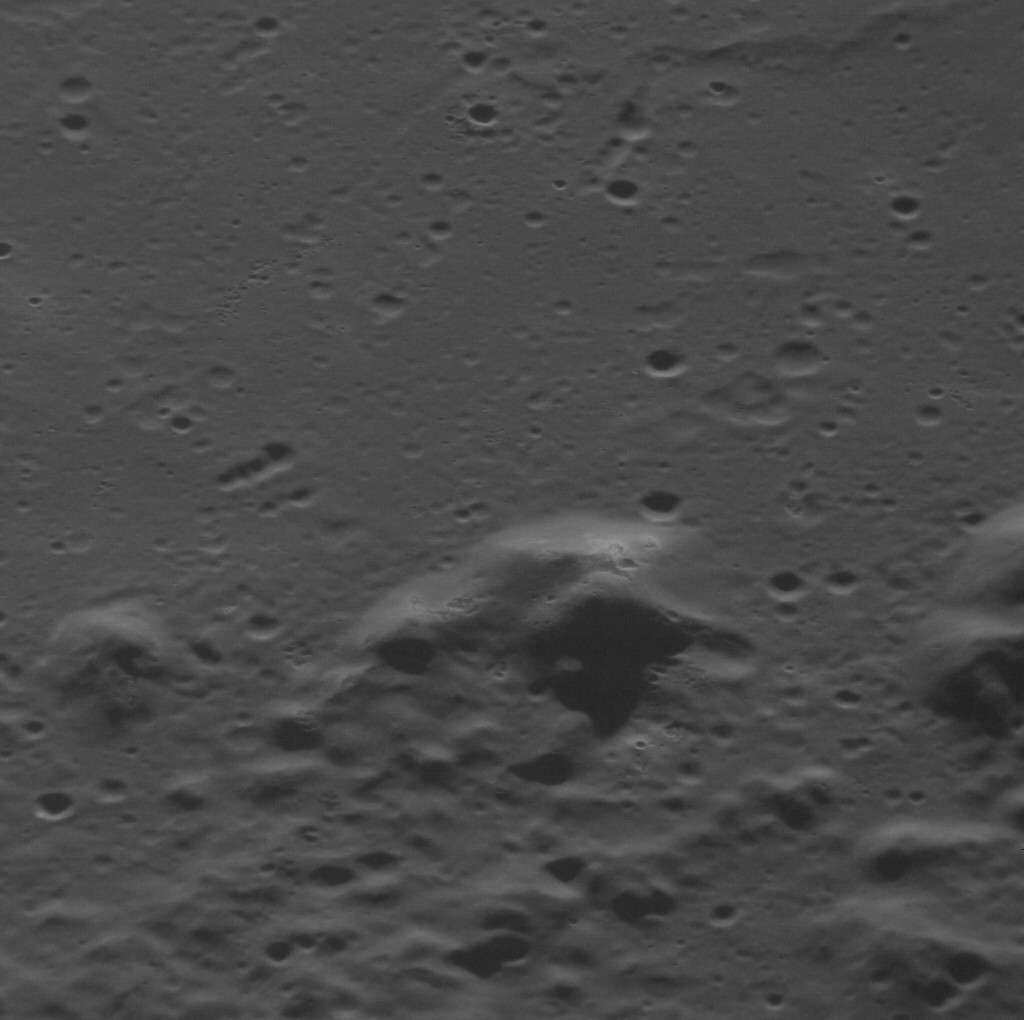
Hollows on a mountain peak within Sousa crater
