= The Thunderer =

March by John Philip Sousa

Song
- Published: 1889
- Genre: March
- Composer: John Philip Sousa

1896
- United States Marine Band 1896 performance: file; help

2007
- United States Army Band 2007 performance: file; help

"The Thunderer" is a march composed by John Philip Sousa in 1889. The origin of the name is attributed to Myron M. Parker, a prominent District of Columbia politician and Freemason. It is also one of Sousa's most famous compositions.

== Composition ==
Sousa developed and dedicated the song for Columbia Commandery No. 2, Knights Templar. He joined the Masonic organization earlier in his career and wished to compose a unique song for the body prior to the Twenty-fourth Triennial Conclave of the Grand Encampment. "The Thunderer" was likely referred to Myron M. Parker, a fellow member of Columbia Commandery, who was organizing the conclave.

The piece is in much the same manner as most of Sousa's music; however, it is one of his first "distinctly American-sounding marches."

== See also ==
- List of marches by John Philip Sousa
