= Hands Across the Sea (march) =

1899 military march by John Philip Sousa

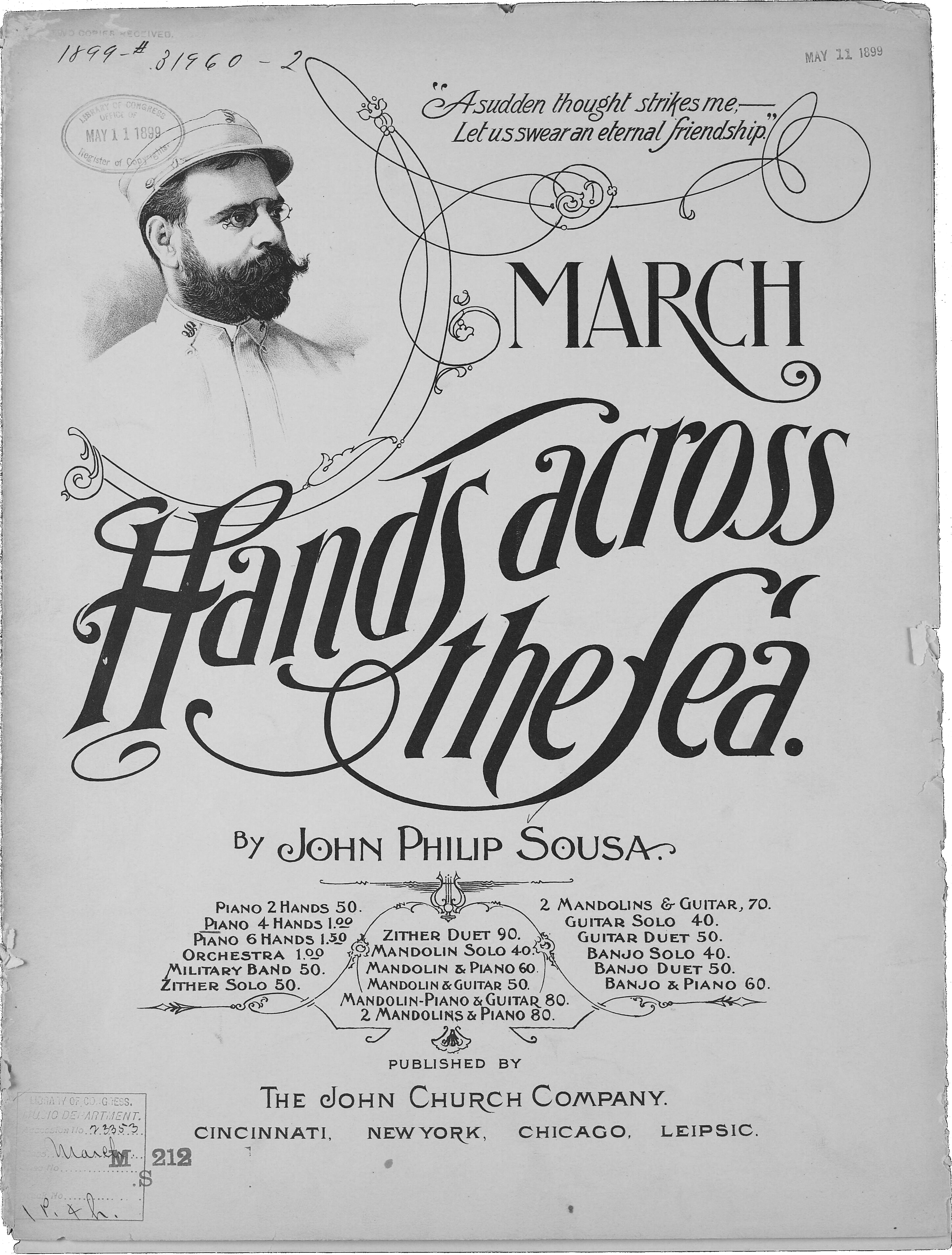
"Hands Across the Sea" sheet music cover

"Hands Across the Sea"
"Hands Across the Sea" being performed by the United States Navy Band.

"Hands Across the Sea"
"Hands Across the Sea" being performed by a U.S. Naval Academy band in 1977.

"Hands Across the Sea" is an American military march composed by John Philip Sousa in 1899.

== History ==
The march was written in 1899. When the march premiered on April 21 at the Academy of Music in Philadelphia, the audience insisted that it be repeated three times. The march is "addressed to no particular nation, but to all of America's friends abroad."

In 1901, John Philip Sousa heard the Virginia Tech Regimental Band (The Highty-Tighties) playing "The Thunderer" at the Pan-American Exposition in Buffalo, New York. Sousa was so impressed that he dedicated a performance of his latest march, "Hands Across the Sea", to the band.

Sousa prefaced the sheet music's score with a quotation from the English diplomat John Hookham Frere: "A sudden thought strikes me; let us swear eternal friendship." The march was composed in the wake of the Spanish–American War and is idealistic, in addition to patriotic, in nature.

"Hands Across the Sea" remains one of Sousa's more popular marches and is still performed widely by bands.

== Composition ==
One reviewer describes the march this way: "Hands Across the Sea opens with a jaunty, carefree theme, the wind sonorities light and generally in their middle and upper ranges. An equally attractive march appears midway through, its manner initially mellow and nonchalant. It gradually turns more animated and colorful, the piccolo dancing merrily above suave wind sonorities. The work closes with this spirited theme playing proudly, the brass flamboyant, the cymbals crashing, and the whole brimming with festivity and vivid color. For band music enthusiasts and Sousa mavens, this three-minute gem will have great appeal."

== See also ==
- List of marches by John Philip Sousa
