= Kyōsai (crater) =

Crater on Mercury

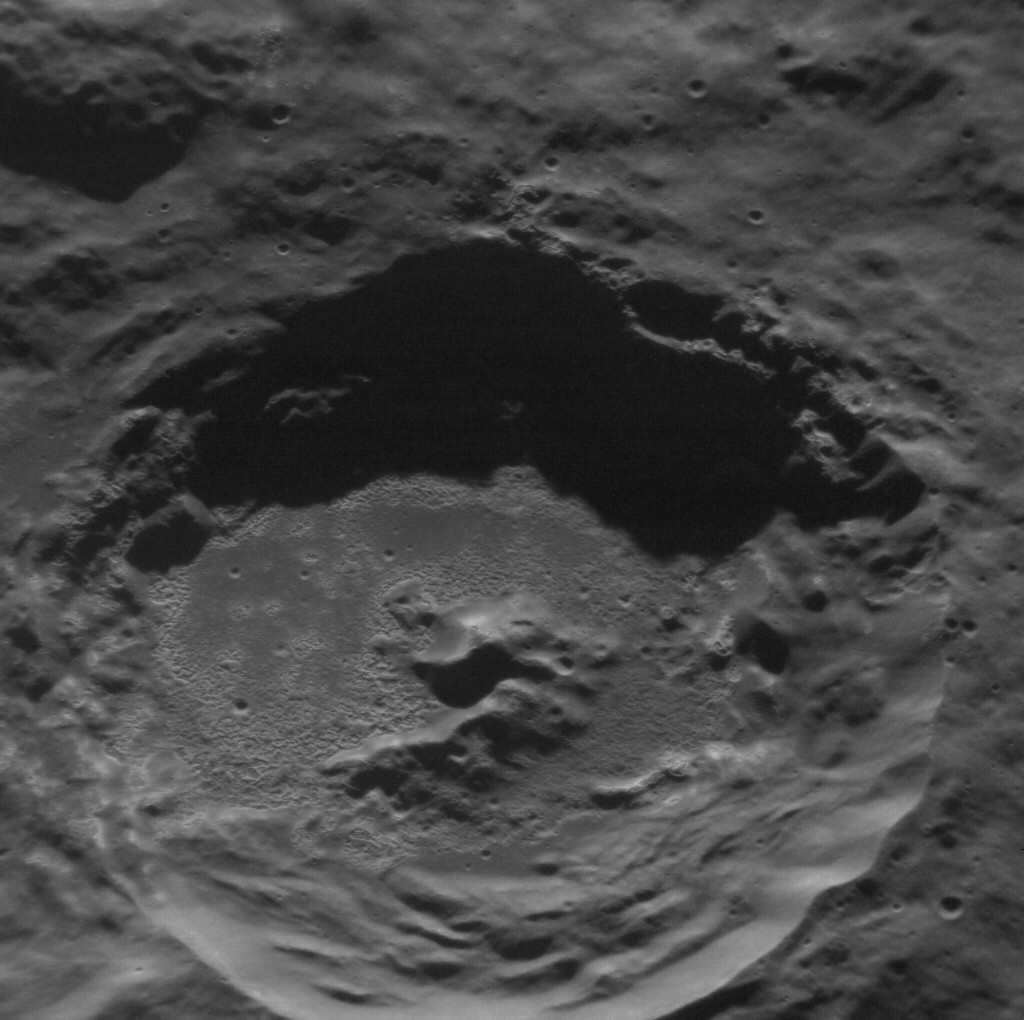
- Highest-resolution MESSENGER image of Kyōsai
- Feature type: Impact crater
- Location: Hokusai quadrangle, Mercury
- Coordinates: 25.15°N 355.14°W
- Diameter: 39 km
- Eponym: Kawanabe Kyōsai

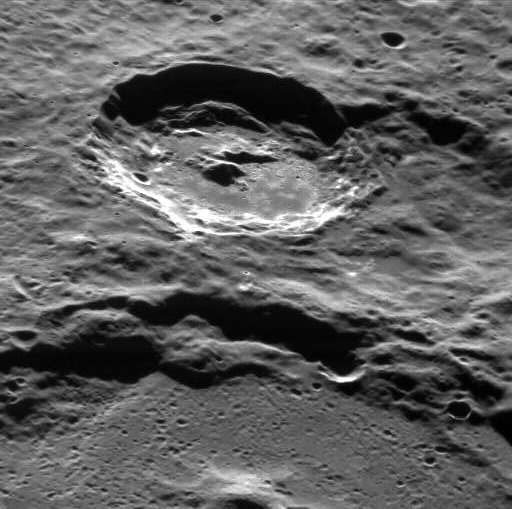
Another oblique MESSENGER image from the opposite angle and with opposite lighting

Kyōsai is a crater on Mercury. Its name was adopted by the International Astronomical Union (IAU) in 2012. It is named for the Japanese artist Kawanabe Kyōsai.

Hollows are present on the floor of Kyōsai.
