= Church, Paxson & Co. =

American music publishing company

Church, Paxson & Company (aka Church-Paxson Co.) was a New York City-based music publishing company founded in 1909 by Clarence Clinton Merrick Church and Clement Esmond Paxson. In 1919, the company reorganized as C.C. Church & Co. and moved its headquarters to Hartford, where, in 1922, it incorporated. C.C. Church & Co. maintained its New York office at 1367 Broadway.

== Company history ==
In 1910, the incorporators were (i) Clarence Clement Merrick Church of Nutley, New Jersey, (ii) William Thomas Pierson of New York City, and (iii) Robert Forsyth Little (1874–1923) of New York City. Although Clement Esmond Paxson was a namesake of Church, Paxson & Co. and was listed as a member of its board in 1910, New York City directories (1909–1919) do not list him among the company's officers. The 1910 directory identifies Clarence C. Church as president from 1910 through 1917, William C. Polla (William Conrad Polla) as secretary, and William T. Pierson as treasurer in 1910.

=== Clarence Clement Merrick Church ===
Church earned a Bachelor of Science Degree in Electrical Engineering in 1907 from George Washington University. Before that – since graduating from Eastern High School, in Washington, D.C. – he played flute in local orchestras and chamber groups, including the Rebew Orchestra (of Washington), an amateur orchestra founded and conducted by Henry William Weber (1861–1927). The ensemble – which ran from 1899 until 1942 – bears Weber's name, spelled backwards.

=== Clement Esmond Paxson ===
Paxson's principal career was in electrical engineering. He graduated from the University of Pennsylvania in 1902 with a Bachelor of Science in electrical engineering. On March 23, 1905, he married a painter, Ethel Gould Easton, in Meriden, Connecticut, at St. Paul's Universalist Church. At the time of his marriage, he was Chief Engineer for the Chesapeake & Potomac Telephone Company (C&P Telephone) of Washington, D.C. From about 1910 to about 1916, his wife, Ethel Paxson, composed and wrote lyrics to music published by Church, Paxson and Company, under the pseudonym, Lettie Gould. In 1916, Paxson was in Rio de Janeiro on assignment as Chief Engineer with Stone & Webster to install lines there. Ethel accompanied Clement Paxson in Rio; and, while there, painted the countryside and seashore. She has been chronicled as one of the first American impressionist artists to paint there.

=== William Thomas Pierson ===
Will Pierson became Assistant Engineer at C&P Telephone of Washington, D.C. In November 1907, Pierson became founding president of the Columbia Music Publishing Company, Inc., an enterprise organized by a group of Washington musicians and composers in response to the limited local publication of works by Washington composers. The Washington Post reported that "very few" compositions by Washington composers had been published in the city and described the new publishing firm as a cooperative music-publishing company intended to operate along the lines of the country's larger publishing houses. At its organization, the company already held numerous manuscripts – popular and classical – for prospective publication. Pierson was elected president – William Armstrong Boyd (1878–1939), vice president and treasurer, and Odell Long Whipple, Sr. (1869–1940), secretary.

Pierson, a pianist and composer, was not principally a professional musician. A 1903 graduate of George Washington University with a Bachelor of Science in electrical engineering, he worked as an assistant engineer for the Chesapeake & Potomac Telephone Company of Washington, D.C., where Clement Esmond Paxson was chief engineer. Nevertheless, Pierson composed music and became founding president of the Columbia Music Publishing Company in 1907. His later association with Church, Paxson & Co. extended this publishing activity. His compositions published earlier by Columbia Music subsequently appeared under the Church, Paxson & Co. imprint. Among them was "Love Me Lots and Love Me All the Time," with music by Pierson and words by William A. Boyd, his fellow Columbia Music Publishing Company officer, copyrighted by Church, Paxson & Co. in 1909.

Pierson – in 1909 in Washington, D.C. – served as best man in Clarence Clinton Church and Bertha Amory Lane's wedding.

=== Dissolution ===
The 1918 Polk Co-Partnership Directory for New York City listed Church, Paxson & Co. as dissolved.

== Selected publications ==
Title	Year	Composer	Lyricist	Cover illustration
"Salute the Flag," march and two-step	1902 (Note: "Salute the Flag": © 1902 by The Pierson and Bogley Publishing Co. Transferred 1908 to The Columbia Music Publishing Company, Inc., Washington, D.C. (see Sophocles Papas). Transferred 1910 to Church, Paxson & Co.)	William Thomas Pierson, Jr. (1879–1936)	(solo piano)	Edward Henry Pfeiffer
"Rippling Waters," caprice (pp. 36–41)	1904 (Note: "Rippling Waters": © Will T. Pierson, Jr. & Co., Washington, D.C. © Transferred 1908 to Columbia Music Publishing Company, Washington, D.C. © Transferred 1918 to C. C. Church & Co.)	William Thomas Pierson	(solo piano)	Edward Henry Pfeiffer
"The University March and Two Step"	1904 (Note: "University March and Two Step": © 1904 by Will T. Pierson & Co. © Transferred 1908 to Columbia Music Publishing Company, Washington, D.C. © Transferred in 1910 to Church, Paxson & Co. © Transferred)	William Thomas Pierson	(solo piano)	Artist unidentified (Note: "The University March and Two Step": The cover illustration features a flag of Columbian University (in 1904, renamed George Washington University), bearing the university seal and the Latin inscription Universitatis Columbianae Sigillum ("Seal of Columbian University"). GWU was Pierson's alma mater.)
"Love's Offering," valse intermezzo	1905 (Note: "Love's Offering": © 1905 by Paul Cohn. Transferred 1912 to Church, Paxson & Co.)	C. Paul	(solo piano)	
"Dream Waltz"	1907 (Note: "Dream Waltz": © 1907 by P.J. Howley, Inc. Leased in 1910 to Church, Paxson & Co.)	W.C. Powell (William Conrad Polla)	(solo piano)	John Frew
"Love Me Lots and Love Me All the Time"	1909 (Note: "Love Me Lots and Love Me All the Time": © 1909 by The Columbia Music Publishing Company, Inc.)	William Thomas Pierson	Will A. Boyd	
"Someone" (pp. 64–69)	1909 (Note: "Someone": © 1909 by Will Rossiter. © Transferred to Church, Paxson & Co. around 1915.)	Al Piantadosi	Jeffrey T. Branen (1872–1927)	William Austin Starmer, featuring roses and ornamental framing, photo center inset of Florence Bindley in theatrical costume
"China Clock and a Dresden Cat (Tic-Toc)" (pp. 45–50)	1910	W.C. Powell (William Conrad Polla)	Clarence Patrick McDonald	Jenkins
"Roses"	1910	James A. MacElwee	James A. MacElwee	Edward Henry Pfeiffer
"Little Soldier March" (pp. 84–89)	1910 (Note: "Little Soldier March": © 1910 by Church, Paxson & Co. © transferred 1918 to C.C. Church & Co., Hartford. © assigned 1930 to Belwin, Inc.)	W.C. Powell (William Conrad Polla)	(solo piano)	Clara Miller Burd – C.C. Church & Co. ed.
"Little Soldier March"	1910 (Note: "Little Soldier March": © 1910 by Church, Paxson & Co. © Transferred 1918 to C.C. Church & Co., Hartford. © assigned 1930 to Belwin, Inc.)	W.C. Powell (William Conrad Polla)	(solo piano)	Charles Arthur Etherington (1880–1960) – 1930 Belwin ed.
"Beautiful Thoughts of Love," novelette ("The piece that contains the world's greatest melody")	1910	Jerome Heller	(solo piano)	
"Mother Is the Best Sweetheart of All"	1910	Jerome Heller	Lettie Gould (pseudonym of Ethel Paxson; 1885–1982)	
"Twilight Shadows," a reverie	1910	Jerome Heller	(solo piano)	William Austin Starmer
"My Father Was a Soldier"	1910	Julian Jordan	Julian Jordan	
"Rose Petals," reverie (tone poem)	1910	William Thomas Pierson	(solo piano)	
"I'll Return to You My Sweetheart (And the Dear Old Georgia Pines)"	1910	William Thomas Pierson	Robert G[arland] Irby (1884–1930), of New Orleans	Jenkins
"The Irresistible Rag"	1910	W.C. Powell (William Conrad Polla)	(solo piano)	Edward Henry Pfeiffer
"Cry Baby"	1910	Harold J. Norman	J. Irving Young (Joe Young)	Edward Henry Pfeiffer
"Smiling Eyes"	1910	Minerva W. Fields	Joe Young (J. Irving Young)	Edward Henry Pfeiffer
"Dreams of You"	1911	Robert Harold May	Robert Harold May	
"Emogene"	1911	William Thomas Pierson	Jessie I. Pierson (Note: "Emogene": Jessie I. Pierson (née Jessie Imogene Browne; 1855–1934), the lyricist, was the mother of William Thomas Pierson, the composer.)	
"Cairo", oriental intermezzo patrol	1911	W.C. Powell (William Conrad Polla)	(solo piano)	Edward Henry Pfeiffer
"Evening Prayer," reverie (pp. 3–8)	1911	Lettie Gould	(solo piano)	Guy de Bouthillier-Chavigny (né Claude Marie Dominique Joseph Guy de Bouthillier-Chavigny; 1893–1962)
"Loves Whispering Waltzes" (pp. 9–16)	1911	Lettie Gould	(solo piano)	B&W portrait photo of a woman on cover
"Give My Love to Mother"	1911	Anna Mullen	Lettie Gould	Edward Henry Pfeiffer
"Love Waltz"	1911	Jerome Heller	(solo piano)	John Frew
"The Rosary," poem, in A♭	1911	Jerome Heller	Robert Cameron Rogers	
"My Little Girlie Girl"	1911	W.C. Powell (William Conrad Polla)	Lettie Gould	
"A La Bien Aimee (Love Waltz)," Op. 59 no. 2	1911	Édouard Schütt	(solo piano; arr. by J[acob] Frank Leve; 1864–1959)	
"Sparkling Stars," caprice	1911	Benjamin Richmond	(solo piano)	
"Autalia," sérénade	1911	Cécile Louise Stéphanie Chaminade (1857–1944)	(solo piano)	
"The Little Brook"	1911 (Note: "The Little Brook": © 1911 by Church, Paxson & Co. © Transferred in 1918 to C. C. Church & Co.)	Friederich Werner	(solo piano)	
"It Isn't Hard to Love a Girl Like You"	1911	W.C. Powell (William Conrad Polla)	Martin [Edward] Swauger (1887–1965)	
"You Musical Ragtime Sal" (Note: "You Musical Ragtime Sal": "Sal (Sally) McAnna played a grand piano in a nickel show every night".)	1911	W.C. Powell (William Conrad Polla)	Martin [Edward] Swauger (1887–1965)	Edward Henry Pfeiffer
"Barcarolle," from The Tales of Hoffmann	1912	Jacques Offenbach	William Conrad (William Conrad Polla), arr.	
"Somewhere in Dixie Lives the Girl I Love" (pp. 85–90)	1912	W.C. Powell (William Conrad Polla)	Martin [Edward] Swauger (1887–1965)	Edward Henry Pfeiffer
"Berceuse," words by Alexander Hamilton, Jr.	1912	Anonymous		
"Passing Birds" (Oiseaux passants), tarantelle for pianoforte	1912	Ernest Lent (1856–1922)		
"Happy Hearts," morceau élégant (elegant composition)	1912	Ernest Lent	(solo piano, "To Miss Dolores Burns")	
"Scherzino"	1912	Ernest Lent	(solo piano)	
"The Robin's Departure"	1912 (Note: "Robins Departure": © 1897 by Oliver Ditson Co., Boston.)	Leander Fisher	Revised and arranged by W. Conrad (William Conrad Polla)	
"True Blue Sue"	1912	Thurland Chattaway	Thurland Chattaway	John Frew
"The Greyhound (Lusitania March)" (Note: The Lusitania was popularly known as the "Greyhound of the Seas.")	1912	John Parker	(solo piano)	Edward Henry Pfeiffer
The Three Graces, Op. 1: 1. "Faith," no. 1; 2. "Hope," no. 2; 3. "Charity," no. 3	1912	William Conrad Polla		
Salon Pieces, Op. 2: 1. "Valse Caprice" no. 1; 2. "Air de Ballet," no. 2	1912	William Conrad Polla		
"Twittering Birds," reverie (pp. 76–81)	1912	John J. Fitzpatrick	(solo piano)	Walter Menige Dunk (1855–1929) (there's at least 1 other ed. with different artwork)
"Only a Bunch of Violets"	1912	Jerome Heller	Lettie Gould	
"Bouquet of Roses"	1912	Jerome Heller	(solo piano)	Edward Henry Pfeiffer
"Summer Dreams Waltz"	1912	William Thomas Pierson	(solo piano)	
"My Rose in a World of Tears" (Note: "My Rose in a World of Tears": "Respectfully dedicated to Mme Buckhout" (aka Jennie Buckhout; married to Edward Weeks Buckhout; née Jennie Hall; 1866–1925). Mme Buckhout was a vocalist.)	1912	Jerome Heller	Harry D. Kerr	
"Mazurka de Concert"	1912	Arthur Lange		
Op. 15: Songs From the Greek (2 of 6 published with Church, Paxson): 1. "Golden Eyes," no. 2". From Rufinus (fl. c. 3rd or 4th century AD), translated in 1894 by Andrew Lang (1844–1912); 2. "Of the Need of Drinking," no. 5." From Ode 19, "Reasons for Drinking," by Anacreon (c. 573 – c. 495 BC), translated 1830 by Thomas Bourne (1806–1881)	1912	Eleanor Everest Freer		
Op. 17, "She's Somewhere in the Sunlight Strong," no. 1	1912	Eleanor Everest Freer	Richard Le Gallienne (1866–1947)	
Op. 18: 1. "Fate's Decree," no. 3 (low voice). Thomas Moore (1779–1852); 2. "Nay! But You Who Do Not Love Her," no. 4 (low voice). Robert Browning (1812–1889)	1912	Eleanor Everest Freer		
Op. 24, "Old Love Song," no. 1	1912	Eleanor Everest Freer	William Gerard Chapman (1877–1945)	
Op. 25, "A Devout Lover," no. 3	1912	Eleanor Everest Freer	Thomas Randolph (1605–1635)	
"The Fawn"	1912 (Note: "The Fawn": © transferred in 1918 to C.C. Church & Co. © Assigned in 1930 to Belwin, Inc.)	William Schiller	(solo piano)	Edward Henry Pfeiffer
Kerr–Polla Songs (Poems), Op. 4: 1. "I Looked Into Thine Eyes," no. 1; 2. "Slumber in Thy Little Nest," no. 2; 3. "When You Are Near," no. 3; 4. "Could I But Read Your Heart," no. 4; 5. "The Shepherd's Call," no. 5; 6. "Love's Secret," no. 6; 7. "Shadows of Evening," no. 7	1912	William Conrad Polla (1876–1939)	Harry D. Kerr	
Holiday Series: 1. "May Day Frolics," no. 1; 2. "Hallowe'en Revels," no. 2; 3. "New Year's Greeting," no. 3; 4. "Chimes on Christmas Morning," no. 4; 5. "St. Patrick's Day Pranks," no. 5; 6. "Easter Thoughts," no. 6; 7. "Children's Day," no. 7	1912	William Conrad (William Conrad Polla)		
"Love's Sweet Dream," Op. 111	1912	Louis Albert Drumheller (1854–1936)	(solo piano)	Edward Henry Pfeiffer
"Offenbach (Jacques)," from Tales of Hoffman	1912	William Conrad (William Conrad Polla)		
"Iris," redowa three-step	1912	Mabel R. Kaufman	Mabel R. Kaufman	
"Gavotte Petite"	1912	William Conrad (William Conrad Polla)	(solo piano)	
Mammy Songs: 1. "Kitty Cat"; 2. "Busted Dolly"; 3. "Go to Sleep, My Little Black Baby"	1913	Josephine Merwin Cook (née Josephine Steed Merwin; 1856–1951)	Josephine Merwin Cook	
"Laughing Eyes"	1913	W.C. Powell (William Conrad Polla)	W.C. Powell (William Conrad Polla)	Edward Henry Pfeiffer
"Kiss Me Pretty"	1913	W.C. Powell (William Conrad Polla)		
"Reflections," meditation	1913	Jerome Heller		
"Twinkling Stars"	1913 (Note: "Twinkling Stars": © 1913 by Church, Paxson & Co. © Transferred 1918 to C.C. Church & Co., Hartford. © assigned in 1930 to Belwin, Inc.)	Jerome Heller	(solo piano)	C.C. Church ed: Cover image: © by The Knapp Co. Inc., New York
"Normandy Chimes"	1913	W.C. Powell (William Conrad Polla)	(solo piano)	Edward Henry Pfeiffer
"Rose Waltz"	1913	W.C. Williams (William Conrad Polla)	(solo piano)	John Frew
"I Love Thee"	1913	Horace Kirkus Dugdale (Note: Horace Kirkus Dugdale (1890–1980) was a Washington, D.C., music publisher who operated one of the leading early twentieth-century "song-poem" publishing businesses. His company solicited songs and poems from aspiring writers, offering to arrange, publish, and promote their work for a fee. Dugdale and other prominent song-poem publishers were prosecuted for mail fraud in 1913, and the H. Kirkus Dugdale Company filed for bankruptcy in 1915. His solicitation of amateur writers was extensive, with promotional material reaching prospective customers as far away as Australia.)	Donald M. McLeran	
"Go To Sleep, My Baby," song,," song, from the 7th piece (of 8) of Dvořák's Humoresque, Op. 101 (Note: "Go To Sleep My Baby": Heller's adaptation – with a vocal range of D4–F5 – is in E♭ major, a minor third below the G♭ major of Dvořák's original. Vocal range:)	1914	Jerome Heller	Lettie Gould	
"Would You Take a Chance With Me"	1914	W.C. Powell (William Conrad Polla)	William Denight Cobb (1876–1930)	Edward Henry Pfeiffer
"Florentine Waltzes", Il ballo mascherato [The Masked Ball]	1914	Martha Unger (1889–1951) (Note: Martha Unger married Samuel Bronstein November 2, 1924, in Manhattan.)	(solo piano)	Edward Henry Pfeiffer
Moving Picture Operetta, Op. 12: 1. "Ol' Mammy Coon," southern dialect song. no. 2 (Note: "Ol' Mammy Coon" was a poem by Camp, originally published March 14, 1903 by the Boston Evening Transcript. The poem's central joke is a running racial double entendre. It uses "coon" for (i) raccoon and (ii) a racial slur. On the surface, it depicts a mother raccoon looking for her stray cub. Beneath the literal narrative, the mother raccoon might mistake the Black child addressed by the narrator for her cub: "How she tell de diff'ence 'tween yo'". The stereotyped African-American dialect and mammy caricature make the racial meaning an overt trope rather than merely incidental. The song belongs to the historical genre of "coon songs" and blackface minstrelsy. The genre's racial stereotypes and caricatures were criticized as derogatory by African Americans even during its popularity around the turn of the twentieth century. See Mammy stereotype and Stereotypes of African Americans)	1914	J[ohn] Lawrence Erb (1877–1950)	Pauline Frances Camp (née Pauline Frances Bishop; 1863–1939)	
Overture Potpourri, A Moving Picture Operetta Dedicated to the Pianists of the Movies and the Public That Plays the Piano Which This Music Will Interest: 1. "March–opening–chaser", two-step 2. "Waltz, Ballroom Scene"; 3. "Hurry–Struggle"; 4. "Processional March"; 5. "Love Scene"; 6. "Western Music", cowboy music, intermezzo, two-step 7. "Chinese"; 8. "Japanese"; 9. "Wedding"; 10. "Chimes"; 11. "Sad Scene"; 12. "Funeral March"; 13. "Convent Garden, Religious Scene"; 14. "Mysterioso, Creeps"; 15. "Minuet, Colonial Scenes; 16. "Indian Music"; 17. "Water Scene, Sailing Scene"; 18. "Desert Scene, Waltz"; 19. "Hurry", "Villain", "Fire"; 20. "Tango"	1914	W.C. Powell (William Conrad Polla)	(solo piano)	
National Songs of the Nations, Comprising National Airs of: 1. America; 2. Germany; 3. France; 4. Austria; 5. Russia; 6. Belgium; 7. England; 8. Italy; 9. Canada; 10. Mexico; 11. Scotland; 12. Ireland; 13. Japan	1914	John Parker, arr.	(solo piano)	William Austin Starmer
"Dengozo," maxixe tango by Ernesto Nazareth	1914	William Conrad (William Conrad Polla), arr.	(solo piano)	Edward Henry Pfeiffer
"Hesitation Con Amore" [Hesitation With Love], hesitation waltz	1914	W.C. Powell (William Conrad Polla)	(solo piano)	Myron "Grim" Natwick (1890–1990)
"Romance," reverie	1914	Sol ("Sally") Ohnhaus (1875–1950)	(solo piano)	
"Valse Decembré (Valse Boston)" (pp. 145–152)	1914	Walter Rolfe (1880–1944)	(solo piano)	Edward Henry Pfeiffer
"Country Club", fox trot	1914	William Thomas Pierson	(solo piano)	Edward Henry Pfeiffer
"You Made My Dreams Come True"	1914	W.C. Powell (William Conrad Polla)	Grace Newell	
"Chimes of Westminster," reverie for piano, with imitation church chimes	1915 (Note: "Chimes of Westminster": © 1915 by Harold Freeman Company, Providence, Rhode Island; © 1916 by Church, Paxson & Co. © transferred 1918 to Church, Paxson & Co. © Assigned 1930 to Belwin, Inc..)	Harold [Brown] Freeman (1892–1924)	(solo piano)	Edward Henry Pfeiffer
"My Rose Marie" (Note: "My Rose Marie": Discography of American Historical Recordings, s.v. "MacElwee, James A.".)	1915 (Note: "My Rose Marie": © 1908 by the Columbia Music Publishing Company, Inc., Washington, D.C. © Transferred 1910 to Church, Paxson & Co., N.Y., U.S.A. © Transferred in 1918 to C.C. Church & Co., Hartford.)	James A. MacElwee	James A. MacElwee	Cover image: © by The Knapp Co. Inc., New York
"The Songs of Ages (Down the Lane of Life)"	1915	Jerome Heller	Jerome Heller	
"Love Knots"	1915	W.C. Powell (William Conrad Polla)	Lettie Gould	
"Vision," waltz	1915	Jules Holfman	(solo piano)	Edward Henry Pfeiffer
"When a Lovable Girl Loves You"	1915	W.C. Powell (William Conrad Polla)	Martin [Edward] Swauger (1887–1965)	
"Joy of Youth," tarantelle	1915	Hans Engelmann	(solo piano; fingered and annotated by J. Frank Leve)	
"Melody of Spring," reverie	1915	Hans Engelmann	(solo piano; fingered and annotated by J. Frank Leve)	
"In Crocus Time (Blumenlied)" Op. 43	1915	Ruth Vincent (Note: Ruth Vincent was the pseudonym of Claudia Jenkins (née Claudia Henderson Pritchard; 1860–1937), widow of Col. Aaron Dallas Jenkins (1847–1910), and mother of Burke Prichard Jenkins (1879–1948), a magazine fiction writer and story writer of about 10 silent films from 1920 to 1927. Under Claudia's pseudonym, she also published music (between 1912 and 1918) with Evans Music Company and B.F. Wood Music Co., both of Boston.)	(solo piano; fingered and annotated by J. Frank Leve)	
"Moonbeams," romance. Op. 45	1915	Ruth Vincent	(solo piano)	(solo piano; fingered and annotated by J. Frank Leve)
"My Garden of Memories"	1915	Philip Schwartz (1889–1964)	W.L. "Billy" Beardsley	
"Hymns My Dear Old Mother Sang to Me"	1915	Philip Schwartz	W.L. "Billy" Beardsley	
"Irresistible Rag"	1915	Horace Kirkus Dugdale	Donald M. McLeran	
"Love's Victory Waltz"	1915	R.C. Harwood	(solo piano)	
"At Evening," Nocturne, Op. 312	1915	Alberto Himan (1853–1924)	(solo piano)	
"I'll Mend the Heart I Have Broken (Because I Love You Dear)" (pp. 8–13)	1915	Milton Sherman	Milton Sherman	
"You Are the Rose of My Heart"	1915	W.C. Powell (William Conrad Polla)	Ralph Livingston (pseudonym of Ralph Livingston McIlwain; 1885–1932)	
"By the Sea," reverie	1915	Leander Fisher (1850–1918)	(solo piano)	William Austin Starmer
"No Town Is Like Your Home Town"	1915	Philip Leo Ponce (1886–1945)	Philip Leo Ponce (1886–1945)	André De Takacs
"Dear Little Girl"	1915	Mabel R. Kaufman		
"Valse Estelle"	1915	E. Goldston (Roy E. Nolte; 1896–1979)		
"Down Deep in a Submarine," song for baritone voice	1915	Harry D. Kerr	Harry D. Kerr	
"Sweet Irish Rose (From Dear Old Killarney)"	1915	Thurland Chattaway	Thurland Chattaway	André De Takacs
"Battle in the Sky," sectional, marche militaire	1915	J. Luxton	(solo piano)	Edward Henry Pfeiffer
"Goose Step," novelty one-step (pp. 21–26)	1915	Eugene Platzmann (1876–1949)		William Austin Starmer
"Love's Pleading"	1916	William Thomas Pierson	(solo piano)	
"Goose Step," novelty one-step	1916	Eugene Platzmann	Arr. for orchestra and piano by George Frederick Briegel	
"You'll Be the Queen in My Kingdom of Love"	1916	Eugene Platzmann	Harry Delf	
"Cuori che si amano (Sweetheart's Melody)"	1916	P[ietro] (Peter) Ballatore (1888–1969)	(solo piano)	
"Danza (Dance)"	1916	P[ietro] (Peter) Ballatore (1888–1969)	(solo piano)	
"Minita," three-step (pp. 54–59)	1916	Eugene Platzmann	(solo piano)	Edward Henry Pfeiffer
"Down by the Babbling Brook" (pp. 1–7)	1916	Milton Sherman	Milton Sherman	Edward Henry Pfeiffer
"Valse Coquette"	1916	W.C. Powell (William Conrad Polla)	(solo piano)	
"Open Thy Gates to Me"	1916	Henry Banachowski de Packh (1878–1955)	Robert G[arland] Irby (1884–1930), of New Orleans	
"International Fox Trot"	1916 (Note: "International Fox Trot": "Used by arrangement with Oliver Ditson Company, owners of the copyright)	Eugene Platzmann	(solo piano)	
"Wiosna (Springtime)," polka (Note: "Wiosna" is Polish for "springtime".)	1916	Cyrus S[tevens] Mallard (1888–1972)	(solo piano)	
"Go Ask the Rose"	1916	Frederick [John] Seymour (1886–1971)	Frederick [John] Seymour	
"Sweetheart," song	1916	Jerome Heller	Lettie Gould	
"I Can't Forget"	1916	Thurland Chattaway	Thurland Chattaway	
"The Battle of the Marne," descriptive march fantasia, Op. 2	1916	J. Luxton	(solo piano)	Albert Wilfred Barbelle (1887–1957)
"Sons of America (America Needs You)"	1917 (Note: "Sons of America (America Needs You)": Pierson is the publisher. Church, Paxson & Co. is the selling agent.)	William Thomas Pierson	Arthur Freeman Holt (1866–1933) (Note: "Sons of America": Arthur Freeman Holt, the lyricist, was the father-in-law of William Thomas Pierson, the composer. He was an auditor for the IRS.)	Dedicated to Capt. William Henry Santelmann (1863–1932): 1. W.T. Pierson & Co. ed. (1917); Church, Paxson & Co., selling agent→ Walter Menige Dunk: Columbia, personification of America, draped in the American flag with arms outstretched 2. W.T. Pierson & Co. ed. (1917) → Walter Menige Dunk: Uncle Sam pointing toward an Army & Navy recruiting station beside a uniformed soldier playing a bugle, with a rifle resting against his shoulder
"An Autumn Idyl"	1917 (Note: "An Autumn Idyl": © 1917 by Church, Paxson & Co. © Transferred in 1918 to C.C. Church & Co. Copyright assigned in 1930 to Belwin, Inc.)	Louis Leslie Loth (1888–1974)	(solo piano; edited, fingered, and annotated by J. Frank Leve. E.B. 445)	Belwin ed. (1930): Ewing Galloway (photographer)
"A Dutch Lullaby"	1917	E[llsworth] S[amuel] Phelps (born 1857)	(solo piano; edited and fingered by J. Frank Leve)	
"Dream On," a lullaby	1917 (Note: "Dream On": © 1917 by Church, Paxson & Co. © Transferred in 1918 to C.C. Church & Co.)	E[llsworth] S[amuel] Phelps (born 1857)	(solo piano)	
"Columbian Patrol"	1917	E[llsworth] S[amuel] Phelps (born 1857)	(solo piano)	
"Spring Blossoms," Op. 46	1917	Ruth Vincent	(solo piano; edited and fingered by J. Frank Leve)	
"An Old Garden," tone poem	1917 (Note: "An Old Garden": © 1917 by Church, Paxson & Co. © Transferred 1918 to C.C. Church & Co.)	Anice Terhune (1873–1964)	(solo piano; edited, fingered, and annotated by J. Frank Leve)	Cover image: © by The Knapp Co. Inc., New York; Cover illustration by Walter Lorenzo Greene
"Neptune Ponders," Op. 48	1917	Ruth Vincent	(solo piano; edited and fingered by J. Frank Leve)	
"Gypsy Rose"	1917	Elmer Olson	Elmer Olson	
"Ysmita," Japanese serenade	1917 (Note: "Ysmita": © 1917 by Church, Paxson & Co. © Assigned 1930 to Belwin, Inc..)	Hans Engelmann	(solo piano)	
"Valse Jeanette" (Note: "Valse Jeanette": Solo piano piece is featured on mechanical music and Wurlitzer rolls – WMPO (Wurlitzer Mandolin PianOrchestra) – 863.)	1917	Lillian Jacobson	(solo piano)	
"There's a Sweet Little Girl (And She's Waiting for Me)"	1917	Raymond Alexander Browne (1871–1922)	Paul Wilson	Walter Menige Dunk
"Do You Really Care?"	1917	W.C. Powell (William Conrad Polla)	Sadie E. Rowan	
"Mood Pensive" (pp. 9–16)	1917 (Note: "Mood Pensive": © 1917 by Church, Paxson & Co. © Transferred 1918 to C. C. Church & Co.)	Walter Rolfe	(solo piano)	Cover image: © by The Knapp Co. Inc., New York
"For Freedom and Humanity"	1917	Henry Haaf (1878–1969)	Peter McAvoy	
"Somewhere"	1918	Henry L. Willard	Henry L. Willard	Walter Menige Dunk (1855–1929)
"Uncle Sam We'll All Be There"	1918	Edward M. Ingraham	Edward A[ndrus] Terhune, Jr. (1895–1976)	R.C. Daly
"Don't Forget to Write, My Dear"	1918 (Note: "Don't Forget to Write My Dear": © transferred in 1918 to Elgin Mason, New York)	Elgin Mason	Elgin Mason	Edward Henry Pfeiffer

== Selected audio ==
- "Battle of the Marne" (matrix 4673. Recorded April 20, 1916, New York, New York). 4-minute Edison Amberola Record No. 3018. Special Edison Re-Creations of National & Patriotic Music. Composed by J. Luxton; New York Military Band (Sodero's Band), Cesare Sodero, conducting. Orange, New York: Edison Disc catalog no. 50422. 1917.
1. Bibliography via:
  1. Discogs.
  2. UC Santa Barbara (DAHR).
  3. Stanford.
2. Audio via YouTube (4673-C 2–80X). (Forgotten and Abandoned Music).
3. Alternate version → Edison Cylinder record: "Battle Of The Marne" 3018.
- Will Pierson (December 21, 2021). "Salute the Flag," march arr. 4-hands; Pianostyle 46101. Steinway Model K 65/88 Note Pianola Player Piano Pianolist: Adam Ramet. The Edwardian Pianist – via YouTube (piano roll).
- Word Roll: "Columbian Patrol" (QRS roll #33276). Edmond S. Phelps, composer. QRS Music Technologies – Church-Paxson Co. 1918. (Special Collection M1646.P44 C65 1917 PAM)

== Affiliations ==
- National Music Publishers' Association, Church, Paxson & Co. was one of twenty-two founding firms in 1917.

== See also ==
- Parlor music
- Salon music
- Tin Pan Alley
- Great American Songbook

== Bibliography ==
=== References ===
- Artvee. "Knapp & Co" (Artvee LLC seemingly is an aggregator/redistributor of public domain images and resources. Artvee does to purport to be peer-reviewed. Its principals are Matthew Victor Reza and Erin Rosalie Ocker-Reza).
- "Boston Evening Transcript". LCCN sn84-23792; ISSN 2640-5776; OCLC 11022371 (all editions).
1. Camp, Pauline Frances [at Wikidata] (March 14, 1903). "Literature" – "Ol' Mammy Coon" (Written for The Transcript). Vol. 74 (Last ed.). p. 20 (column 2).
  1. Via Newspapers.com.
  2. Via Digital Commonwealth (Boston Public Library).
- Brooks, William (Winter 2016). "The Rehearsal". American Music. Music and the Great War. 34 (4). University of Illinois Press: 507–534. ISSN 1945-2349 (online), ISSN 0734-4392 (print); doi:10.5406/americanmusic.34.4.0507; JSTOR 10.5406/americanmusic.34.4.0507.
- Catalogue of Copyright Entries. "Third Series" "Renewal Registrations – Music". Vol. 5, Part 5C, No. 1. January–June 1951.
1. "A Little Dance". © 13 March 1923, E558960; Renewed 12 March 1951, R75931, by [Claudia] Jenkins (author). p. 40.
  1. Via Internet Archive (Michigan).
  2. Via Wikimedia Commons (Library of Congress).
2. "The Little Lead Soldiers". © 13 March 1923, E558961; Renewed 12 March 1951, R75932, by [Claudia] Jenkins (author). p. 40.
  1. Via Internet Archive (Michigan).
  2. Via Wikimedia Commons (Library of Congress).
- Daily Argus (The) (November 25, 1969). "Death Notices" – "Haaf, Henry". "Obituaries – "Henry Haaf". Vol. 78, no. 202. Mount Vernon, New York. p. 2 (columns 1 & 3) – via Newspapers.com. LCCN sn83-31711; ISSN 1060-4723; OCLC 10089215.
- Hartford Courant (The) (October 9, 1909). "An Attractive Home Wedding". Vol. 73 (Daily ed.). p. 12 (column 2, middle) – via Newspapers.com.
- Edwards, Bill. "Edward H. Pfeiffer". Website administrator: Bill Edwards.
- General Alumni Catalogue of the University of Pennsylvania. University of Pennsylvania. General Alumni Society. 1917. p. 202.
1. Via Google Books (University of Virginia).
- Evening Star (The). Washington, D.C.
1. "Affairs in Alexandria: General Matters" (whole issue no. 17224). November 21, 1907. p. 10.
  1. Via Newspapers.com.
2. "William A. Boyd Dies of Heart Attack". Vol. 87, whole no. 34853. October 3, 1939. p. 11 (section A).
  1. Via Newspapers.com.
- Library of Congress. "Digitized Music": "Eleanor Everest Freer: A Guide to Resources". Collection: The Library of Congress Celebrates the Songs of America.
- Musical America (August 16, 1924). "Passed Away" ... "Alberto Himan" (obituary). Vol. 40, no. 17. p. 31 – via Internet Archive.
- Music Trades (August 3, 1919). "Church, Paxson & Co. Reorganize". Vol. 56, no. 5. p. 35.
1. Via Google Books (Princeton).
- Music Trade Review (April 15, 1922). "Church & Co. Incorporates". Vol. 74, no. 15. p. 52.
1. Pdf via International Arcade Museum Library.
The incorporators were Clarence C. Church and Martin Victor Chameroy (1872–1929), of Hartford, and Julius C. Weiss (1874–1964), of New York.
- New York Times (The). LCCN sn78-4456, LCCN sn00-61556; ISSN 0362-4331, ISSN 1553-8095 (online); OCLC 1645522 (all editions).
1. "J. Frank Leve". Vol. 108, whole no. 37014. May 28, 1959. p. 19 (column 5, middle). Retrieved August 26, 2026.
  1. NYTimes Archives → Blog.
  2. TimesMachine → Pdf (PDF); Permalink.
- Publishers' Weekly (The).
1. "Business Notes" (re: Church, Paxson & Co). Vol. 77, no. 5 (whole no. 1983). January 29, 1910. p. 181.
  1. Via Internet Archive.
Church, Paxson & Co. have been incorporated to publish musical literature and books; capital stock, $10,000. The incorporators are Clarence C. Church, Nutley, New Jersey; William T. Pierson and Robert F. Little, both of New York.
- Riley, Carolyn (ed.). Contemporary Authors – A Bio-Bibliographical Guide to Current Authors and Their Work. Gale Research Company. ISBN 978-0-8103-0010-1, 0-8103-0010-9; OCLC 462766635, 867423101, 462766635, 320439807, 635040583.
1. Volumes 25–28: "Paxson, Ethel 1885". 1971. p. 562.
  1. Via Internet Archive (Lourds High School → De La Salle School → acquired via Elementary and Secondary Education Act, Title II, Chicago Board of Education).
- San Diego Sun (The) (January 19, 1918). "Musical Composer Called By Death" (re: Leander Fisher). Vol. 37, whole no. 11327. p. 6 (column 7, top).
1. Via Newspapers.com.
- Secretary of the Commonwealth of Virginia. Annual Report of the Secretary of the Commonwealth to the Governor and General Assembly of Virginia.
1. For the Year Ending September 30, 1909. Name change, March 1, 1909: "The Columbia Music Publishing Co., Inc." to "Columbia Music Co., Inc.". Richmond: Davis Bottom, Superintendent of Public Printing. p. 275.
  1. Via Google Books (University of Michigan). p. 275.
- University of Maine Collections. University of Maine System Libraries Primo Discovery Portal. Special Collections and Projects Department.
1. Historical Collections Archive → Main Music Box:
  1. Vocal Popular Sheet Music Collection.
  2. Parlor and Salon Sheet Music Collection.
Note: The University of Maine migrated its digital collections from Digital Commons to Alma Specto in 2026; the individual sheet-music links herein are to the current Alma Specto records. Alma Specto is a digital collections management platform developed by Ex Libris (a Clarivate company).
- Van Tassel, Charles Sumner, ed. (1929). Story of the Maumee Valley, Toledo, and the Sandusky Region (4 Vols). Also Special Articles by Able Writers, and Individual Histories of Northwestern Ohio Counties by Well Known Authorities. Chicago: The S.J. Clarke Publishing Company. Re-print → Salem, Massachusetts: Higginson Book Company. LCCN 30-13810; OCLC 343849 (all editions).
1. Vol. 3: "Frederick Seymour". pp. 454–458.
  1. Internet Archive (Greene County Public Library).
  2. Google Books (University of Michigan).
- Washington Post (December 1, 1907). Music and Musicians" (whole issue no. 11497). p. 8 (part 2) (digital image 28, column 1, bottom).
- Washington Times (The). Washington, District of Columbia. LCCN sn84-26749; ISSN 1941-0697; OCLC 10630160 (all editions).
1. "New Martial Air for U.S. Soldiers – Song Composed and Written by Two Washingtonians – Heard for First Time Today – Played by Mariend Band at Red Cross Dedication" (whole issue no. 10163). May 12, 1917. p. 2 (columns 2–4, top).
  1. Via Newspapers.com.
  2. Via Library of Congress.
