= Harry D. Kerr =

American music publisher, songwriter

Harry David Kerr (8 October 1880 Santa Rosa, California – 21 May 1957 Los Angeles) was an American songwriter, lyricist, author, and lawyer. Kerr became active in music at age 15 (1895). The practice of law had been his prime avocation until 1920, when he decided to focus on songwriting. But he still continued to use his legal training in music. In 1922, while living in New York City, Kerr prepared the incorporation documents for the American Society of Composers, Authors and Publishers (ASCAP), of which he had become one of 90 charter members at its founding in 1914.

== Copyright activist ==
From February 1900 to 1903, he had studied law in the law office of George H. Cobb of Watertown, New York. In May 1905, Kerr received an LL.B. from Albany Law School.

Beginning in 1907 as a young lawyer, Kerr worked for about 18 months with a coalition in Washington, D.C., for the passage of the Copyright Act of 1909, which secured the rights of composers to charge royalties on the sales of sound recordings. While lobbying for it, Kerr was associated with the New York City law firm Dougherty, Olcott & Tenney.

The U.S. Congregational Committee on Copyrights began hearings Mary 26–28, 1908, at the Library of Congress, to vet the concerns and proposals of authors and managers. Constituent groups giving testimony were the (i) National Association of Theatrical Managers, (ii) the Allied Copyright Committee, and (iii) the White Rats, an author advocacy group of which Kerr was a member.

In 1909, Kerr also wrote the lyrics to "Get on a Raft With Taft," President William H. Taft's campaign song — a particularly memorable concept given that Taft weighed 300 lbs. Taft signed the Copyright Act into law.

== Growing up ==
Kerr attended Gouverneur High School, Gouverneur, New York, during the 1899–1900 school-year. He moved to Watertown, New York, sometime after that, but before 1901.

== Career before becoming a lawyer ==
In June 1901, Kerr moved from Watertown, New York, to Denver to accept an executive and governance position — corporate secretary and director — with The New York Mining and Development Company, of which Ezekiel Hanson Cook, PhD (1845–1907), who from 1994 to 1889 had been the president of Potsdam Normal College, was president. Charles Finding was the Vice President and Charles Love was the Treasurer. The same group of executives simultaneously ran another Denver-based mining company called Mountain Pride Mining Co.

== Selected songs ==
(publisher unknown)

- "Listen to the Rain," lyrics by Kerr, music by Henry Joseph Tandler (1881–1940)
- "Send Back Dear Daddy To Me," lyrics by Kerr, music by Irving Maslof
- "Sweetheart Days," lyrics by Kerr, music by Homer Tourjée (1866–1943) (1920)
- "Don't Make Your Sweet Mama Cry Over You," lyrics by Kerr, music by Earl Burtnett, arranged by Vern Elliott (1922)
- "If I Had a Little Girl Like You," lyrics by Kerr, music by Otto Milton Heinzman (1873–1943) (1935)
- "Just You, Dear," lyrics by Kerr, music by Otto Milton Heinzman (1873–1943) (1935)
- "I'd Love to Know," lyrics by Kerr, music by Otto Motzan (1880–1937) (1920) OCLC 497638092
- "If All The Years Were Mine," lyrics by Kerr, music by Henry Joseph Tandler (1881–1940) (1920) OCLC 497790450
- "There's No Other Rose Like You," lyrics by Kerr, music by William Alexander OCLC 499112564
- "My Rosebud Rosary," lyrics by Hal Billings (pseudonym of Kerr), music by Charlie Straight & Roy Bargy, arranged by Otto Frey (1921)
- "When Love's the Gondolier," lyrics by Hal Billings (pseudonym of Kerr), music by Henry R. Cohen (1922) OCLC 497294660
- "I Can't Forgive and Forget," lyrics by Hal Billings (pseudonym of Kerr), music by Joseph Meyer (1923)
- "Pep," (aka "Yankee Pep") lyrics by Kerr, music by Elizabeth D. Armer, arranged by Homer Tourjée (1866–1943) (1919)
- "If Solomon Had a Million Wives Today," lyrics and music by Kerr (manuscript)
- "My Heart is the Harbor to Hold All Your Love," lyrics and music by Kerr (manuscript)
- "That's Where I Love You the Most," lyrics and music by Kerr (manuscript)
- "When Your Love Crept Into My Heart," lyrics by Kerr, music by William (Billy) D. Alexander (1919)

Windsor Music Co, Chicago, New York

- "Waiting," lyrics & music by Kerr (1902) OCLC 497461849
- "Dorothy Waltzes," lyrics & music by Kerr (1903) OCLC 497461770
- "Elinore Waltzes," lyrics & music by Kerr (1904) OCLC 497461800

Willis Woodward & Co., New York

- "May I Call on You?," lyrics by Kerr, music by Henry Arthur Blumenthal (1906) OCLC 60563951

The Mammoth Music Company, Albany, New York

- "Put Your Shoes in My Trunk," lyrics by Kerr, music by Henry P. Vogel (1906) OCLC 497586583
- "When Daddy Sings the Little Ones to Sleep," lyrics by Kerr, music by Henry P. Vogel
- "Don't Say Good Bye, Sweet Elinore," lyrics by Kerr, music by Henry P. Vogel (1906)
- "Blue Eyed Mary," lyrics by Kerr, music by Henry P. Vogel

Roger A. Graham, Providence

- All I heard was 'Dance me round again, Bill,' lyrics by Kerr, music by William C. Lindemann (1909); OCLC 499080597
- Love Is Only A Dream, lyrics by Kerr, music by William C. Lindemann (1909); OCLC 499080615

Metropolis Music Co.

- "Lull Me To Sleep, That Slumber Melody," lyrics by Kerr, music by Ted S. Barron (née Theodore S. Barron; 1879–1943) (1914) OCLC 460205549
- "My Rosy Love Dreams of You," lyrics by Kerr, music by Ted S. Barron (1879–1943) (1914)

M. Witmark & Sons

- "Drifting Down the Old St. Lawrence," lyrics & music by Kerr (1900) OCLC 497461786
- "The Ebony-Colored Club; Ethiopian Two-Step," lyrics & music by Kerr (1901) OCLC 497461793
- "Where Love Alone is King," lyrics by Kerr, music by Ernest R. Ball (1907) OCLC 26004936
- "In a Little Wigwam," lyrics & music by Kerr (1908) OCLC 497461832
- "Father Has a Tender Heart," lyrics & music by Kerr (1908) OCLC 497461812
- "I'm Just a Ragged Newsboy, But My Heart's True Blue," lyrics & music by Kerr (1908) OCLC 497461816
- "There's a Sunny Smile Waiting For Me," lyrics by Kerr, music by Leo Edwards (1930) OCLC 46440107

Jerome H. Remick & Co., Detroit, New York

- "Won't You Share a Little Home With Me?" lyrics & music by Kerr (1908) OCLC 497461867
- "Tell Me the Story of Love," lyrics by Kerr, music by C Sharpe Minor (Charles Sharpe Minor; died 1957) (1920) OCLC 519664060
- "Some Day the Long Way Will Turn," lyrics by Kerr, music by Henry Joseph Tandler (1881–1940) (1920) OCLC 16643124
- "Years," lyrics by Kerr, music by Otto Motzan (1880–1937) (1920)
- "Just Keep a Thought For Me," lyrics by Kerr, music by Earl Burtnett & Max Fischer, arr. by J. Bodewalt Lampe (1921) OCLC 27128294
- "Two Tiny Hands," lyrics by Kerr, Henry Joseph Tandler (1881–1940) (1920)
- "Manzanilla" (tango), lyrics by Hal Billings (pseudonym of Kerr), music Henry Joseph Tandler (1881–1940) (1923) OCLC 498261140
- "Counting the Days," lyrics by Kerr, music by Earl Burtnett & Jess Kirkpatrick (1924) OCLC 367765060
- "Guessing," lyrics by Kerr, music by Henry R. Cohen, cover artist William Austin Starmer (1925)

Leo Feist, Inc.

- "Just Tell Me You Are Mine," lyrics by Kerr, music by Ted S. Barron (née Theodore S. Barron; 1879–1943) (1905) OCLC 497688667
- "Get on the Raft With Taft," lyrics by Kerr, music by Abe Holzmann (1908) OCLC 271675663 (President Taft weighed 300 lbs.)
- "Blue Moon," lyrics by Kerr, music by Earl Burtnett & Louis Marcasie (1921) OCLC 15698706
- "Keep All Your Love For Me," lyrics by Kerr, music by Otto Motzan (1880–1937), arranged by Arthur Lange (1919)

French Version: "Tout ton amour pour moi," French text by A. Bollaert

- "Whenever I Think of You," lyrics by Kerr, music by Henry Joseph Tandler (1881–1940) (1929); OCLC 497313851

Victor Kremer Co, Chicago

- "While You are Mine," lyrics by Kerr, music by W G Powell (1907) OCLC 367825707
- "While Love and Life Shall Last," lyrics & music by Kerr (1909) OCLC 497461856

Miller Music Publishing Co., Chicago

- "Ride Me in a Big Balloon," lyrics and music by Kerr (1910) OCLC 499066542
- "When You Marry a Girl For Looks," lyrics & music by Kerr (1910) OCLC 499066594
- "Your Love is My Guiding Star," lyrics & music by Kerr (1910) OCLC 499066633
- "Playin' Honeymoon," lyrics & music by Kerr (1910) OCLC 497461838

Vinton Pub. Co., Boston

- "Sweetest Mem'ries of Courting Days," lyrics and music by Kerr (1911) OCLC 499066554
- "I'd Love to Have You Love Me: (as I Love You)," lyrics & music by Kerr (1911) OCLC 499066507

Joe Morris Music Co., New York

- "We're Ready for Teddy Again," lyrics by Kerr, music by Alfred Solman (1912) OCLC 24205669

Church, Paxson & Co., New York

- "My Rose in a World of Tears," lyrics by Kerr, music by Jerome Heller (1912) OCLC 367837575 (all editions)
- Kerr–Polla Songs, Op. 4. Poems by Kerr. Music by William Polla (pseudonym of William Conrad Polla; 1876–1939). OCLC 499120496 (all editions)
1. "I Looked Into Thine Eyes," No. 1
2. "Slumber in Thy Little Nest," No. 2
3. "When You Are Near," No. 3
4. "Could I But Read Your Heart," No. 4
5. "The Shepherd's Call," No. 5
6. "Love's Secret," No. 6
7. "Shadows of Evening," No. 7
- "Down Deep in a Submarine," lyrics & music by Kerr (1915) OCLC 497461778 (all editions)

C.C. Church & Co., Hartford, Connecticut

- My Yukon Rose," song, lyrics by Kerr, music by William D. Alexander OCLC 1435602517 (all editions)

G. Schirmer

- "Wonderful Love of My Dreams," lyrics by Kerr, music by Henry Joseph Tandler (1881–1940) (1919) OCLC 498898946

C. C. Church & Co., Hartford

- "My Yukon Rose," lyrics by Kerr, music by William D Alexander (1920) OCLC 367893425

New Amsterdam Music Corporation, New York

- "I'm an American, That's All," lyrics by Kerr, music by Johann C. Schmid (1870–1951) (1915) OCLC 232282987, 726909815

Gillick Co., San Francisco

- "When Lola Pedals on the Pianola" (1917) OCLC 499066574
- "You've Certainly Opened My Eyes," (1917) OCLC 499066606
- "When My Alimony Ship Comes In," lyrics & music by Kerr (1917) OCLC 499066585

Joseph W. Stern & Co.

- "She's a Rose in the World of Smiles and Tears," lyrics by Kerr, music by Alfred Baldwin Sloane (1905) OCLC 498202743
- "I've Had Many a Sweetheart But None Like You," lyrics & music by Kerr (1907) OCLC 497461824
- "Make Me a Boy Again Just for Tonight," by music & lyrics by Kerr (1917) OCLC 499066523

Chas. E. Roat Music Co., Battle Creek, Michigan

- "Your Heart is in the Rose," lyrics & music by Kerr (1917) OCLC 499066616

Edward L. Ballenger Music Publishing Co., Los Angeles

- "You Can Always Come Back to Me," lyrics & music by Kerr (1917)
- "In My Garden of Eden," lyrics & music by Kerr (1917)
- "In A Rosy Cosy Arbor (There's A Harbor For Our Love)," lyrics & music by Kerr (1918)
- "That's Why Heaven Sent Me You," lyrics & music by Kerr (1918)

Shapiro, Bernstein & Co.

- "Uncle Sammy, Keep the Family Cellar Full," by Kerr; Anna Chandler, Dave Dreyer (1917) OCLC 499066565
- "Yokohama Love," lyrics by Kerr, music by Billy Alexander (1919) OCLC 224051751
- "Sweet Little Bon-Bon," lyrics by Kerr, music by Sid Grauman (1921) OCLC 224050064

Pace & Handy Music Co., Memphis

- "The Song the Sunny Southland Sings," lyrics & music by Kerr (1917) OCLC 499070095, 499033660

ArtMusic, Inc., New York (Will Von Tilzer; né William Gumm; 1882–1952)

- "Two Big Brown Eyes," lyrics by Kerr, music by Otto Motzan (1880–1937) (1918) OCLC 224050688
- "Love Is Like a Precious Pearl," lyrics by Kerr, music by Otto Motzan (1880–1937) (1919) OCLC 499107360

Broadway Music Corporation (Will Von Tilzer; 1882–1952)

- "Down by the Millside Alongside the Hillside," lyrics by Lew Brown, music by Kerr (1919) OCLC 499151605

Los Angeles Music Publishing Co.

- "Dinah Lee," lyrics by Kerr, music by George J. Hayes (1919) OCLC 367782312
- "Gypsy rose," lyrics by Kerr, music by Constance Loeser (1919)

T. Presser, Philadelphia

- "Only to Live In Your Heart," lyrics by Kerr, music by James Francis Cooke (1919) OCLC 497572117
- "My Dream of Paradise Came True," lyrics by Kerr, music by Homer Tourjée (1866–1943) (1919) OCLC 497319244

F.B. Haviland Pub. Co. (Frederick Benjamin Haviland; 1867–1932)

- "While the Stars in the Heavens Shine," lyrics by Kerr, music by Henry W. Petrie (1941) OCLC 499162780
- "Comrade O' Mine," lyrics by Kerr, music by Elizabeth Thomas (1919)

C. Arthur Fifer Music Co., Quincy, Illinois (Charles Arthur Fifer; 1884–1950)

- "Sailing Down Manila Bay," lyrics by Kerr, music by C. Arthur Fifer (1919)
- "When You're Lonely, So Lonely, Just Drifting," lyrics by Kerr, music by C. Arthur Fifer (1919) OCLC 28203641, 224051305
- "Wonderlove," lyrics by Kerr, music by Henry Joseph Tandler (1881–1940) (1919) OCLC 224051598
- "I've Got a Little Home in the Country," lyrics by Kerr, music by C. Arthur Fifer (1919) OCLC 497751628

L.F. Collin, Melbourne (distributor for C. Arthur Fifer Music Co.)

- "Happy Days," lyrics by Kerr, music by C Arthur Fifer (1919) OCLC 221717600, 224046755
- "Just For a Place In Your Heart," lyrics & music by Kerr OCLC 497917667

Wright Music, Seattle

- "When Love and the World are in Tune," lyrics by Kerr, music by William D. Alexander; Harry D Kerr (1919) OCLC 503006014

A.J. Stasny Music Co.

- "If Tears Could Tell You All," lyrics by Kerr, music by Evans Lloyd (1920) OCLC 75275158

J.W. Jenkin's Sons Music, Kansas City, Missouri

- "Colleen O'Mine," lyrics by Kerr, music by Gerald McDonald (1920) OCLC 49289690
- "Manila Memories," lyrics by Kerr, music by Leo F. Forbstein (1921) OCLC 51060886

Maurice Richmond (1880–1965), New York

- "Tenderly" (fox-trot) lyrics by Kerr, music by George A Little, Jack Stanley, & Harold A Dellon; orchestrated by Mornay D Helm (1921) OCLC 41248173

(aka "Share Your Heart" & "Will You Share Your Heart With Me?")

- "Somebody's Heart Is So Lonely," lyrics by Kerr, music by Otto Motzan (1880–1937) (1919)

Nacio Herb Brown, Los Angeles

- "Love To Think of You," lyrics by Kerr, music by Nacio Herb Brown & Gene Rose (1922)
- "Heathen Lullaby," lyrics by Kerr, music by Nacio Herb Brown (1922)
- "Persian Nights," lyrics by Kerr, music by Nacio Herb Brown, arranged by Vern Elliott (1922)
- "The Sneak," lyrics by Kerr, music by Nacio Herb Brown, arranged by Vern Elliott (1922)

Chappell & Co., Ltd., London

- "Kind Words," lyrics by Randal Moreland (pseudonym of Kerr), music by Lou Traveller (1922) OCLC 498086656

Allan & Co., Melbourne

- "Who Loves You Most of All?," lyrics by Hal Billings (pseudonym of Kerr), music by Henry R. Cohen (1922) OCLC 221716796

J Mills, New York

- "Love is Just a Flower," lyrics by Hal Billings (pseudonym of Kerr), music by Chris Schonberg & Abe Lyman (1923) OCLC 20597831

Waterson, Berlin & Snyder, Inc.

- "Little Thoughts" (fox-trot), lyrics by Hal Billings (pseudonym of Kerr), music by Charley Straight & Roy Bargy; arranged by Arthur Lange (1922) OCLC 39656648
- "G'wan With It," lyrics by Kerr, music by Art Hickman & Earl Burtnett (1924) OCLC 144306050

Sam Fox Publishing Company

- "Jealous Moon," lyrics by Kerr, music by John Stepan Zamecnik (1918) OCLC 26784853
- "Me-ow," lyrics by Kerr, music by Mel B. Kaufman (1919) OCLC 460205611
- "Kisses," lyrics by Kerr, music by John Stepan Zamecnik (1919) OCLC 224045722
- "Your Heart," lyrics by Kerr, music by John Stepan Zamecnik (1919)
- "Taxi," lyrics by Kerr, music by Mel B. Kaufman (1919) OCLC 70854854
- "Love Me," lyrics by Kerr, music by J.S. Zamecnik (1919) OCLC 224047966
- "My Cairo Love" (an Egyptian serenade), lyrics by Kerr, music by J S Zamecnik (1919) OCLC 367832993
- "One Sweet Day," lyrics by Kerr, music by J S Zamecnik (1919) OCLC 43805511
- "Dear Old Dixie Moon," lyrics by Kerr, music by George J. Hayes (1920) OCLC 24885951, 224054749
- "Blue Jeans," lyrics by Kerr, music by Lou Traveller (1920) OCLC 20267261, 459552826
- "Amorita," (Spanish fox-trot), lyrics by Kerr, music by J S Zamecnik (1920) OCLC 61749861
- "Chu-Chu-San" (Japanese fox-trot), lyrics by Kerr, music by Joseph Samuels (1920) OCLC 732263506
- "Stop it!" (one-step song), lyrics by Kerr, music by Mel B. Kaufman (1920) OCLC 474344013
- "Biddy," lyrics by Kerr, music by J.S. Zamecnik (1920) OCLC 224045921
- "Wonderland of Dreams," lyrics by Kerr, music by L W Abbott (pseudonym of Pietro Floridio) (1921) OCLC 48252411
- "Somewhere in Naples," lyrics by Kerr, music by J S Zamecnik (1921) OCLC 221768030
- "What the Little Stars Tell," lyrics by Kerr, music by J S Zamecnik (1921) OCLC 643126678
- "Roaming Away From Me," lyrics by Kerr, music by Eddie Janis & Chris Schonberg (1921) OCLC 224049232
- "Hurdy-Gurdy Blues," (fox-trot), lyrics by Kerr, music by Gene Scott, arranged by J S Zamecnik (1923) OCLC 39702534
- "Neapolitan Nights," lyrics by Kerr, music by John Stepan Zamecnik (1925) OCLC 20597536, 460587485
- "Broken Dreams," lyrics by Kerr, music by Maurice Spitalny (1927) OCLC 795408990, 459711539
- "My Heaven Is Home" (fox-trot), lyrics by Kerr, music by Errol Collins, symphonic orchestration by Joseph Nussbaum (1928) OCLC 638337949
- "Paradise," lyrics by Kerr, music by J S Zamecnik, film score by May Singhi Breen (1928) (theme song of the 1928 film, The Wedding March) OCLC 719608808, 460614644, 795413507
- "Your Love Is All," lyrics by Kerr, music by J S Zamecnik, arranged by May Singhi Breen (as sung in the 1929 film Alibi) (1927) OCLC 271435343
- "Venetia" (with violin & cello obbligato), lyrics by Kerr, music by J S Zamecnik (1930) OCLC 316854080, 457043037
- "Southern Moon," lyrics by Kerr, music by J S Zamecnik (1931) OCLC 367905925
- "Adios My Senorita" (fox trot in In A♭ major), lyrics by Kerr, music by J S Zamecnik, arranged for band by Floyd J St Clair (1931) OCLC 70790722

Henry Burr Music Corporation, New York

- "Baby Curls," lyrics by Kerr, music by John Cooper (1921) OCLC 367535810

Forster Music Publisher, Inc., Inc., Chicago

- "Mem'ries of Love and You," lyrics by Kerr, music by Geoffrey O'Hara (1925) OCLC 367812653

Sherman, Clay & Co., San Francisco

- "Do You Ever Think of Me?" lyrics by Kerr & John Cooper, music by Earl Burtnett (1920) OCLC 20267162, 221628305
- "My Dearest Prayer," lyrics by Kerr, music by Henry Joseph Tandler (1881–1940) (1920) OCLC 19801133
- "Somebody's Waiting," lyrics by Kerr, music by Chris Schonberg (1920) OCLC 26004351, 271354740
- "Have You Forgotten?" lyrics by Kerr, music by Earl Burtnett, John Cooper & Oswald Stevenson (1921) OCLC 798210776
- "You Won't Be Sorry" (fox-trot), lyrics by Kerr, music by Earl Burtnett & Louis Marcasie, arranged by Harry A. Powell (1922) OCLC 11112172
- "Don't Be Too Sure," lyrics by Hal Billings (pseudonym of Kerr), music by Henry R. Cohen (1922) OCLC 26010446
- "Bygones," lyrics by Kerr, music by Irving Abrahamson & Don Warner (1924) OCLC 10328175, 459764217
- "That's My Girl," lyrics by Kerr, music by Joe McKiernan (1924) OCLC 18886956
- "Ships That Pass In the Night," music by W. H. Smith & Earl Burtnett (1925)
- "Rest In My Arms," lyrics by Kerr, music by Earl Burtnett (1925) OCLC 26011591
- "Give Me Today," lyrics by Kerr, music Paul Titsworth & Harold Bell (1926) OCLC 367791605

J. Albert & Son, Sydney

- "Oriental Love Dreams," lyrics by Kerr, music by Earl Burtnett & Henry Miller, cover artist POM Griffith (né Porter Murdock Griffith; 1889–1969) (1924) OCLC 221011677, 224052884, 460637491
- "Croon a Little Lullaby," lyrics by Kerr, music by Chris Schonberg & Clyde Baker (1925) OCLC 221552416

DeSylva, Brown and Henderson Inc., New York — selling agents – Crawford Music Corp.

- "Guns," lyrics by Kerr, music by Geoffrey O'Hara (1928) OCLC 497519514

Suttons, Melbourne

- "Redskin," lyrics by Kerr, music by J S Zamecnik (1929) OCLC 222614867, 795413379 (theme song of the Paramount picture Redskin)

R.L. Huntzinger, New York

- "My Home is a Trailer," lyrics by Kerr, music by Geoffrey O'Hara (1938) OCLC 18607728

William Conrad Polla (1876–1939)

- "When You are Near," (song, Op. 4, No. 3), lyrics by Kerr (1939)
- "Shepherd's Call," (song, Op. 4, No. 5), lyrics by Kerr (1939)
- "Shadows of Evening," (song, Op. 4, No. 7), lyrics by Kerr (1939)

Boston Music

- "A Real Low Down Basso Am I," lyrics by Kerr, music by Geoffrey O'Hara (1948) OCLC 8725018

State Theatre Collection, Sydney, Australia (for cinema use)

- "Love Bound," lyrics by Kerr, music by Carl Rupp (1926) OCLC 271510614
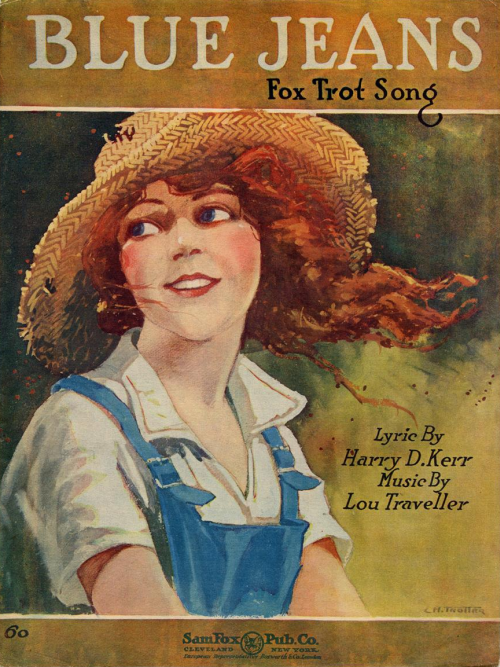

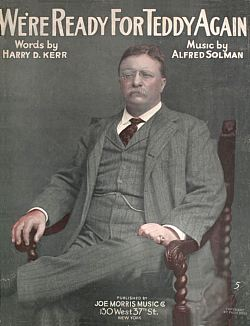

== Selected recordings ==
=== Record labels ===
Blue Amberol Records

- 1922 — Wonderland of Dreams OCLC 40176012

Nordskog Records

- 1922 — Who Loves You Most After All? Harry Baisden and his Bon Ton Orchestra Nordskog 3023B

Brunswick Records

- 1924 — Bygones OCLC 641695487
- 19?? — Bygones OCLC 79811951
- 1924 — Oriental Love Dreams OCLC 5118577
- 19?? — Oriental Love Dreams OCLC 82577509
- 1924 — That's My Girl OCLC 80130497
- 19?? — Rest in My Arms OCLC 83090335
- 1926 — Memories of Love and You OCLC 187982170
- 19?? — Ships that Pass in the Night
- 19?? — In the Heart of the Hills
- 1924 — Go Your Way and I'll Go Mine OCLC 81593453, 30578365, 725458188
- 1925 — Croon a Little Lullaby OCLC 316196650
- 19?? — Croon a Little Lullaby OCLC 84627516
- 1921 — Do You Ever Think Of Me? on YouTube OCLC 5176424
- 19?? — Do You Ever Think Of Me? OCLC 316196650
- 19?? — Do You Ever Think Of Me? OCLC 81444360
- 19?? — Give Me Today, OCLC 78534001
- 19?? — Neapolitan Nights, OCLC 78876313
- 19?? — Neapolitan Nights, OCLC 81754820
- 19?? — You Won't Be Sorry OCLC 77777274
- 1922 — Love Dove OCLC 269440769
- 1924 — My Beautiful Mexican Rose
- 19?? — Monte Carlo Moon OCLC 301989891
- 1924 — Monte Carlo MoonOCLC 304239124
- 1929 — RedskinOCLC 244487751
- 1937 — Rose Room OCLC 45590321
- 1937 — The Morning After OCLC 449186984

Victor

- 1909 — B-7014: In a Little Wigwam, Harvey W. Hindermeyer with orchestra
- 1917 — B-19876: That's Why My Heart is Calling You, Charles Hart with orchestra
- 1917 — B-19878: That's Why My Heart is Calling You, Emilio de Gogorza with orchestra
- 1921 — B-24785: Blue Jeans, Peerless Quartet with orchestra
- 1922 — B-26415: Wonderland of Dreams, Elsie Baker, Olive Kline (duet) with orchestra
- 1924 — B-29518: Counting the Days, male vocal with the International Novelty Orchestra
- 1924 — B-29839: Oriental Love Dreams, vocal duet with the Coon-Sanders Original Nighthawk Orchestra
- 1925 — BVE-33308: Croon a Little Lullaby, male vocal duet with the International Novelty Orchestra
- 1928 — BVE-45681: Neapolitan Nights, male vocal with The Troubadours
- 1928 — BVE-47507: Paradise, Fred Waring and The Pennsylvanians
- 1929 — BVE-49921: Redskin, Helen Clark with orchestra
- 1920 — [Trial 1920-02-09-02]: Was There Ever a Pal Like You?, George Wilton Ballard with piano
- 1928 — [Trial 1928-01-23-01]: Out of the Dusk to You, Dan Gridley with piano

=== Song titles ===
"Neapolitan Nights" ("Oh, Nights of Splendor")

- 19??: Don Clark and His La Monica Ballroom Orchestra OCLC 84128875
- 1926: Harry Reser's Casino Dance Orchestra (instrumental)
- 1928: James Melton (theme song from the synchronized film Fazil)
- 1928: Kjerulf's Mayfair Quintette (feat. in the short film A Musical Melange)
- 1928: Jack Denny & His Orch. (instrumental)
- 1929: The Four Synco-Pets (featured in the short film Musical Moments)
- 1934: Enrico Caruso Jr. - (featured in the film El cantante de Nápoles)
- 1938: Carlos Sanatana's Accordion Band (vocal: Webster Booth)
- 1948: Jo Stafford & Gordon MacRae OCLC 78136264
- 1949: Mario Lanza OCLC 42544990
- 1954: Ferrante & Teicher (instrumental)
- 1954: Frankie Yankovic OCLC 82360817 OCLC 82360817
- 1955: Michel Legrand OCLC 3368014
- 1958: Robert Alda OCLC 13237575
- 1962: Willis "Gator" Jackson (instrumental) OCLC 16075677

== Filmography ==
- Boardwalk Empire (2010 TV series)

Hold Me in Paradise (2010 film) — "Do You Ever Think Of Me?" (uncredited)

- Bugs Bunny's Easter Special (1977 TV special) — "Me-ow" (uncredited)
- The Lawrence Welk Show (TV series)

Episode 8.46 (1963) — "Neapolitan Nights" (uncredited)

- Tweety's Circus (1955 short) — "Me-ow" (uncredited)
- That's the Spirit (1945) — "Do You Ever Think of Me?"
- You're Next to Closing (1939 short) — "Neapolitan Nights" (uncredited)
- The Lady in Red (1935 short) — "Neapolitan Nights" (uncredited)
- El cantante de Nápoles (1935 film) — "Neapolitan Nights" (uncredited)
- Alibi (1929 film) — "Your Love Is All" (uncredited)
- Whispering Winds (1929 film) — "Whenever I Think of You" (theme song), "Listen to the Rain"
- One Stolen Night (1929 film) — "My Cairo Love" (uncredited)
- A Musicale Melange (1929 short) — "Neapolitan Nights" (uncredited)
- Musical Moments (1929 short) — "Neapolitan Nights" (uncredited, performed by The Four Synco-Pets)
- The Wedding March (1928 film) — "Paradise" (the love theme)
- Fazil (1928 film) — "Neapolitan Nights" (uncredited)
- Redskin (1929 film) — "Redskin" on YouTube (uncredited)

== Screenplays ==
- Boston Blackie (TV series)

The Motorcycle Kid (1953) (original story)

- Cheaters (1927 film) (story)

== Radio theme music ==
- The First Nighter Program — Neapolitan Nights

== Pseudonyms ==
- Randal Moreland
- Hal Billings

== Progressive sociological essays by Kerr ==
- The Farce of Jury By Trial, The International: A Review of Two Worlds (journal), edited by George Sylvester Viereck, The Moods Publishing Company, Volumes 8, No. III, March 1914, pg. 98 OCLC 145151604
- Does Drunkenness Follow Prohibition? Overland Monthly, October 1916, pps. 341–347
- Prison Reform, The New Age Magazine, Scottish Rite (publisher), New York, February 1913, pps. 121–130
- If the People Could Own What They Use, The Oriental Economic Review, Vol. 3, No. VII & VIII, May–June 1913, pps. 527–535
- Price Maintenance — The Salvation of Business
- Copyright Legislation — An Answer to the Argument of the Manufacturers of Phonographs and Other Mechanical Reproduction Devices (1908)

== Family ==
Kerr was married twice.

His first marriage was to Harriet Lodge Hastings (maiden; 1883–1946). They married on October 9, 1905, in Albany, New York. His second marriage was to Ruth Eleanor Minter (maiden; 1892–1969). They married on December 20, 1919, in Santa Ana, California, and remained married until his death.
