= Eleanor Everest Freer =

American composer and philanthropist

Eleanor Freer
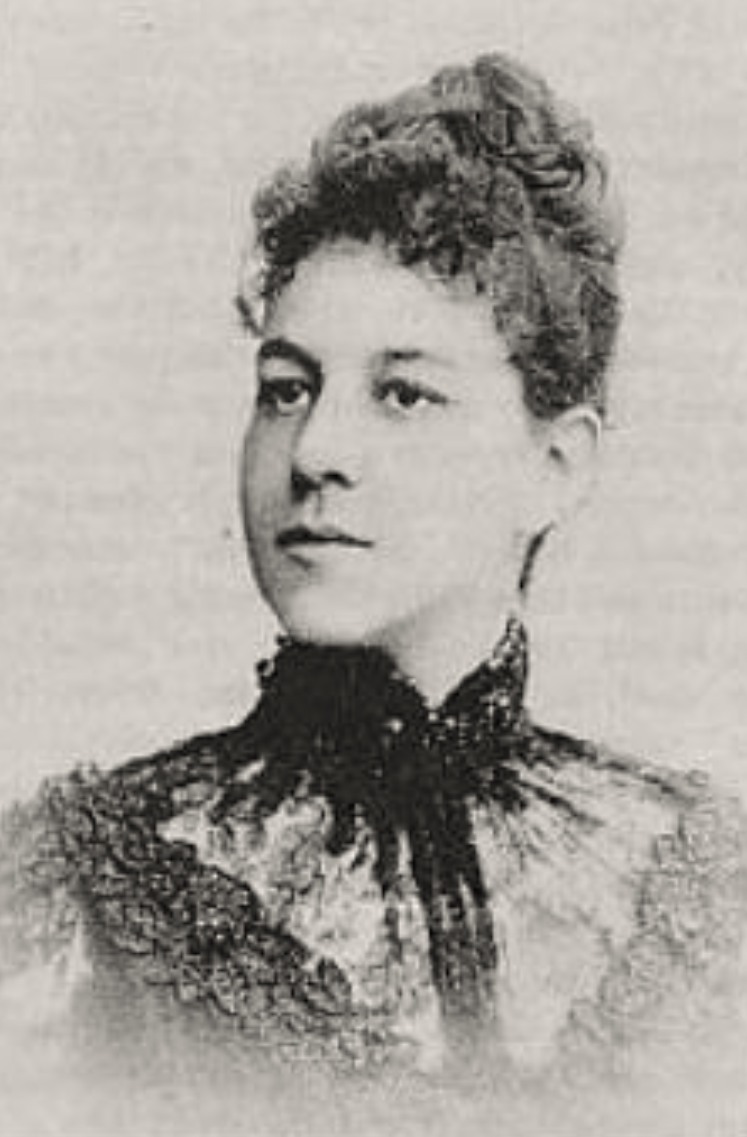
- Born: May 14, 1864; Philadelphia, Pennsylvania, United States
- Died: December 13, 1942 (aged 78); Chicago, Illinois, United States
- Occupations: Singer, teacher, composer

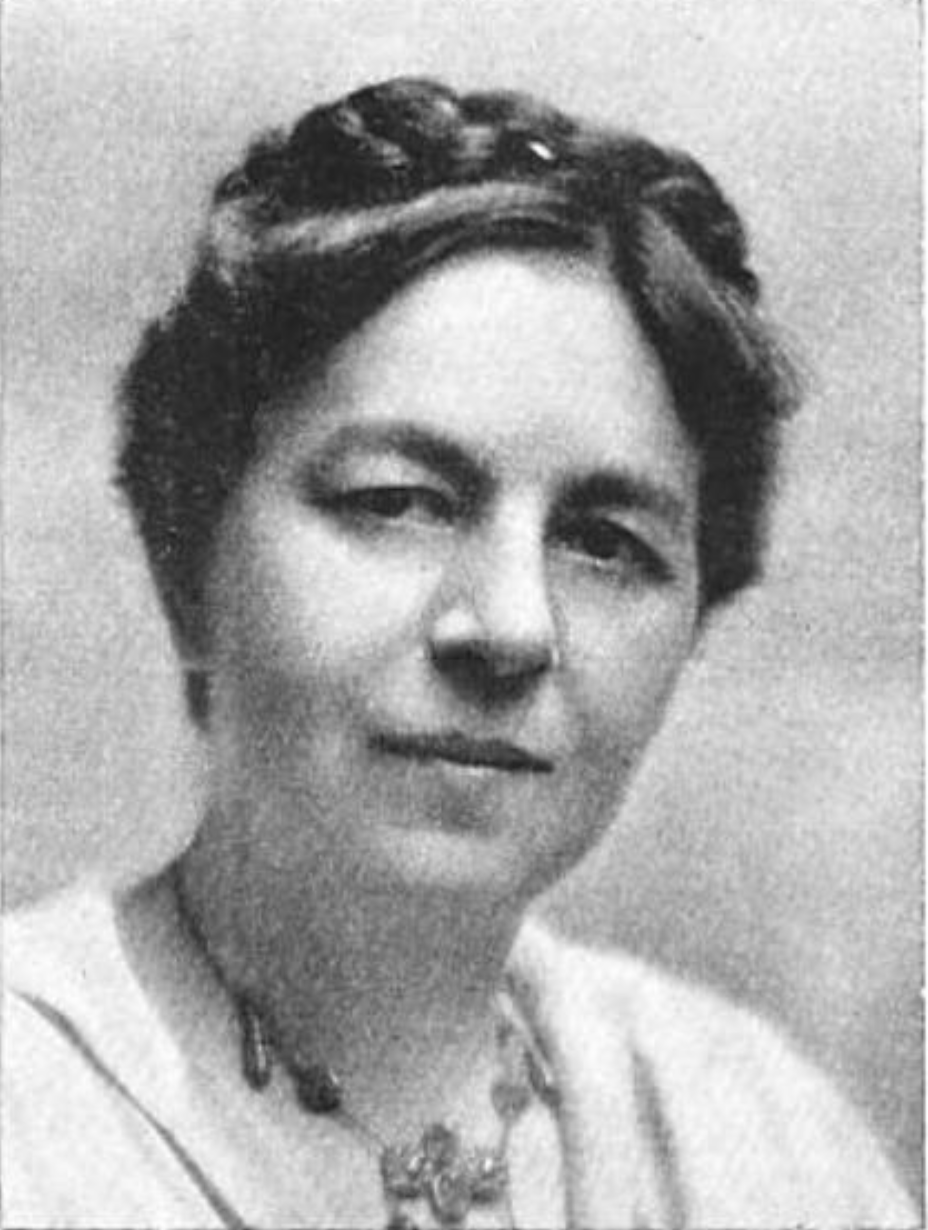
Freer in 1925

Eleanor Everest Freer (née Eleanor Warner Everest; 14 May 1864 Philadelphia – 13 Dec 1942 Chicago) was an American composer and philanthropist.

== Life ==
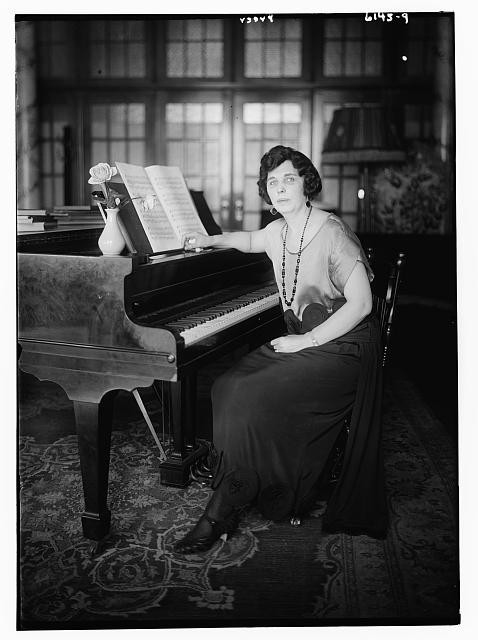
Eleanor Everest Freer

Eleanor Everest was born in Philadelphia, the daughter of Cornelius Everest and Ellen Amelia (Clark) Everest, and studied singing in Paris with Mathilde Marchesi and composition with Benjamin Godard. She taught music in Philadelphia and New York City, and, in 1893, married Chicago physician Archibald Edward Freer (1862–1943). The couple had one daughter and moved to Chicago in 1899, where Eleanor studied music theory with Bernhard Ziehn. In 1934, she received a D.Mus. from the Boguslawski College of Music.

Freer was an active advocate for American opera, and opera sung in English. To this end, she helped to found the Opera in Our Language Foundation (OOLF) in 1921, and the David Bispham Memorial Fund in 1922 to promote concerts of American composers' works and award a Bispham Medal. The two organizations merged in 1924 to become the American Opera Society of Chicago.

Freer's one-act opera The Legend of the Piper was performed numerous times by the American Opera Company from 1928 through 1929. She died in Chicago in 1942.

== Works ==
Freer composed eleven operas and more than 150 songs, many of which were published in collections. Selected works include:

- A Book of Songs, op. 4 (9 songs)
- Five Songs to Spring
- Four Songs
- Six Songs to Nature
- Sonnets from the Portuguese (44 songs)
- The Brownings Go to Italy
- Massimiliano, or The Court Jester, Romantic Opera in One Act
- The Legend of the Piper, opera
- Little Women, opera

== See also ==
- Church, Paxson & Company

== Bibliography ==
=== Sources ===
- Cohen, Aaron I. (1981). International Encyclopedia of Women Composers. New York and London: R.R. Bowker Company. ISBN 0-8352-1288-2; OCLC 7671325 (all editions).

See International Encyclopedia of Women Composers

1. "Freer, Eleanor". p. 166 – via Internet Archive.
- Etude (The). Theodore Presser Company.
1. Cooke, James Francis (1875–1960), ed. (February 1943). "The World of Music" (series) "Mrs. Archibald (Eleanor Everest) Freer" (obituary). Vol. 62, no. 3. p. 73 (column 3) – via Internet Archive.
- Glickman, Sylvia (1932–2006); Schleifer, Martha Furman, eds. (1996). Women Composers – Music Through the Ages (8 Vols.). Detroit & London: G.K. Hall. LCCN 95-24552; ISBN 978-0-7838-8194-2, 0-7838-8194-0 (Vol. 7)
1. Vol. 7: "Composers Born 1800–1899. Vocal Music".
  1. Eversole, Sylvia M. "Eleanor Everest Freer (1864–1942)". pp. 466–476. (IA isbn_0783881940).
- Library of Congress. "Digitized Music": "Eleanor Everest Freer: A Guide to Resources". Collection: The Library of Congress Celebrates the Songs of America.
- "Our History [American Opera Society of Chicago]". American Opera Society of Chicago.
- Sadie, Julie Anne; Samuel, Rhian, eds. (1994). The Norton/Grove dictionary of women composers. W. W. Norton & Company. pp. 176–177. ISBN 978-0-3930-3487-5.
1. "Freer, Eleanor Everest" – via Google Books (limited preview).
