= I Wonder Who's Knitting for Me =

1917 song written by Raymond Leveen and composed by Jessie Winne

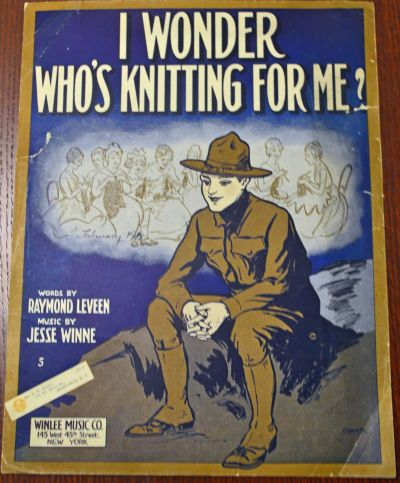
- Sheet music cover

Song
- Language: English
- Published: 1917
- Composer(s): Jessie Winne
- Lyricist(s): Raymond Leveen

"I Wonder Who's Knitting for Me" is a World War I song written by Raymond Leveen and composed by Jessie Winne. It was published in 1917 by Winne Music Co. in New York City. The sheet music cover, illustrated by Starmer, depicts a soldier imagining a woman knitting for him, and features an inset photo of Bert Fitzgibbons.

The sheet music can be found at the Pritzker Military Museum & Library.
