= Harry Baisden =

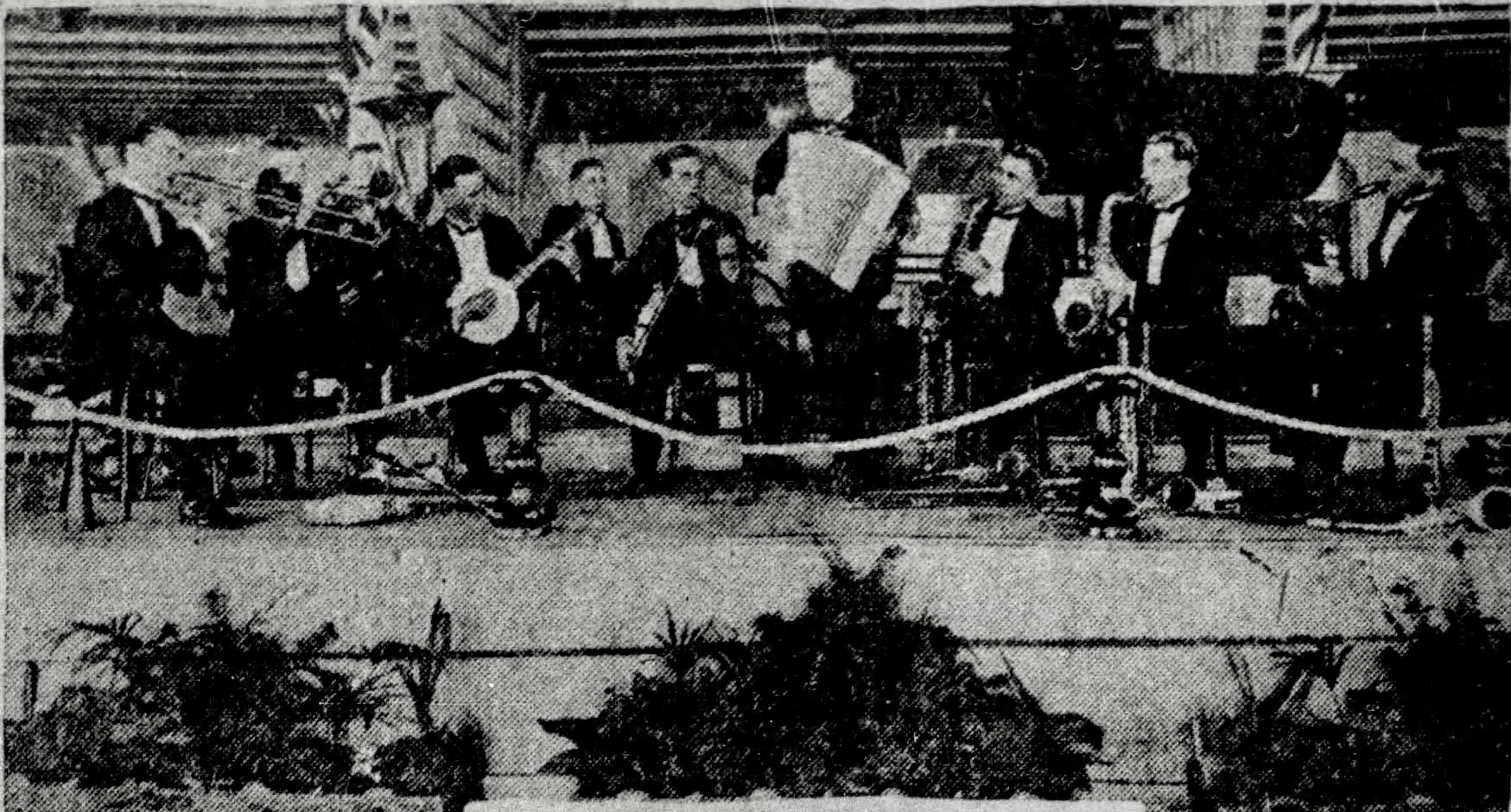
- Harry Baisden's Bon-Ton Orchestra of Ocean Park (1923)

Background information
- Born: Cyrus Harry Baisden; April 18, 1893; Minnesota, United States
- Died: December 4, 1926 (aged 33)
- Genres: Big band
- Occupations: Bandleader, Musician, Arranger, Composer
- Years active: 1915–1924
- Label: Nordskog Records
- Formerly of: Harry Baisden and His Orchestra

Harry Baisden (aka Harry Bastin, né Cyrus Harry Baisden; 18 April 1893 Lester Prairie, Minnesota — 4 December 1926 Augusta, Georgia) was an American composer of popular music, arranger, pianist and an acclaimed dance orchestra leader. While a musician in the U.S. Army 2nd Infantry Band during World War I, Baisden composed several popular wartime songs, namely "Iowa, We Owe A Lot To You", "Meet Me At The Red Cross Ball", "I'll Steal You" and "Camp Cody Blues".

== Early career ==
Minnesota

The earliest extant published reference found of Baisden's vocation as a musician appears in the 1910 Minneapolis City Directory. In 1911, Baisden was a pianist with the Lucas Show, a medicine show managed by Dr. George F. Lucas. The show featured Baisden with the drummer Glenn Silk, The Three Aerial Lucases, gymnasts, York & DeLisco's Animal Circus (Mr. W. B. York (1870– ) and Madam Lottie DeLisco (née Lottie Kelsey; 1880 )) and John P. Mack as comedian. The show reportedly performed to capacity audiences in and around Minnesota, Nebraska and North and South Dakota. Baisden ended his engagement with Lucas some time before September 1911.

World War I

During the war, Baisden was a member of the 2nd Iowa Infantry Band, mustered in 1916 at Camp Dodge, Iowa. At some point, the band (and orchestra), conducted by John Valentine Eppel (1971–1931), was deployed to Camp Cody, New Mexico, but, at some time around May 1918, was re-stationed at Fort Dodge.

After World War I

For about 90 days, beginning some time after Christmas 1918, Baisden toured with "Uncle Sammy's Minstrels", a group of musicians and entertainers composed of musicians who had returned from World War I who, before the war, had been headliners in vaudeville and minstrel shows. The touring company included the 163rd Depot Brigade Band from Camp Dodge, for which Baisden had been a musician. He had also been a piano player at the Magic Theater in Fort Dodge, Iowa, from 1917 to 1919.

California

On May 14, 1924, Charles Lick opened a newly constructed 22,000 square feet (2,000 m^{2}) ballroom on a beachfront ocean pier in the Venice neighborhood of Westside Los Angeles. The ballroom had an oval-shaped dance floor with enhanced acoustics. It was officially named the Bon Ton Ballroom, but was more widely known as the Venice Ballroom, and from 1942, as the Aragon Ballroom. The hall was large enough to be split into two separate ballrooms with different orchestras. From its inaugural day until 1924, Major Baisden, as he was then billed, led his 12-piece orchestra.

The Venice Ballroom engagement included a national broadcast by KFI radio in Los Angeles. In 1924, while engaged at the Venice Ballroom, Baisden became mentally ill. Ben Pollack, who had played for 11 months in Baisden's orchestra, took over as leader from October 1924 to fall 1925.

Illness, hospitalization in Augusta, and death

On December 4, 1926, Baisden died. The cause of death was "general paralysis of the insane". Baisden was buried at West View Cemetery in Augusta.

== Selected compositions ==
Harry C. Baisden, Missouri Valley, Iowa

- "Parcel Post Rag", by Baisden (1913)

Harry Baisden Publishing, Fort Dodge, Iowa

- "Paramount Rag", by Baisden (1915)

Baisden and Poole, Fort Dodge, Iowa

- "Famous Players Rag", by Baisden (1915)

Harry Baisden Publishing, Camp Cody, New Mexico

- "Camp Cody Blues" (fox trot) (1918)

Homer-Garber (Homer Chalet Garber; 1878–1924), Des Moines, Iowa

- "Meet Me at the Red Cross Ball", lyrics by Corporal John Dent Arnold (1890–1948), music by Baisden (1918) OCLC 71790113 OCLC 33283054
- "If You Just Must Go To War, Bring The Kaiser Back Archived 2016-03-02 at the Wayback Machine" (jazz song), by Garland Tucker & Baisden (1918) OCLC 498538050, 726900097
- "I'll Steal You", by Sidney Bartell, Corporal John Dent Arnold (1890–1948) & Baisden (1918) OCLC 804961600, 497695803

Baisden & Arnold, Kansas City, Missouri

- "Iowa, We Owe A Lot To You", lyrics & words by Corporal John Dent Arnold (1890–1948) & Baisden (1918) OCLC 643085338

Baisden-Stevenson Publishing Company, Jacksonville, Florida

- "There'll Come A Day", lyrics by Carlyle Stevenson (1893–1969), music by Baisden (1920) OCLC 50429427, 843995618

Chas. F. Loveland and Harry Baisden, Los Angeles

- "Built a World of Dreams", lyrics & music by Baisden (1923)
- "California, We Owe A Lot To You", lyrics by Carlyle Stevenson (1893–1969), music by Baisden (1922)

Publisher not known

- "Come Back To Your Man, Mi Moi San", words & music by Harry Baisdell (pseudonym or misspelling of Baisden) (composed in or before 1918)
- "Be As Good A Soldier As You Are A Son", lyrics by Mrs. M. Lauretta Green (née Mary Lauretta De Poister; 1883–1928), music by Harry Baisdell (apparent misspelling of Baisden)

== Selected discography ==
Harry Baisden and his Bon Ton Orchestra, Nordskog Records

- 1922 — "Hot n' Cold", by Abe Olman & Henry R. Cohen, Nordskog 3023A
- 1922 — "Who Loves You Most After All?" lyrics by Hal Billings (pseudonym of Harry D. Kerr), music by Henry R. Cohen, Nordskog 3023B

== Notable alumni of the Harry Baisden Orchestra ==
- Ben Pollack, drummer
- Gil Rodin, saxophonist

== Family ==
On July 27, 1918, Baisden married Jessie Marie Leonard (1899–1987) in Jackson County, Iowa.
