= There's a Service Flag Flying at Our House =

1917 song

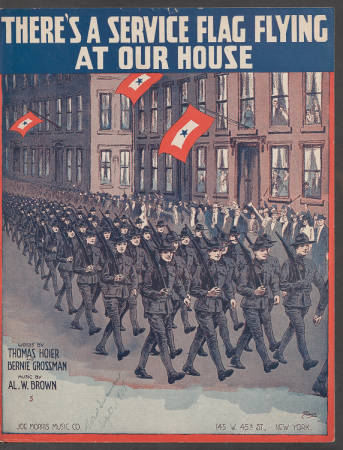

Song
- Released: 1917
- Label: Joe Morris Music Co.
- Composer(s): Al W. Brown
- Lyricist(s): Thomas Hoier and Bernie Grossman

"There's a Service Flag Flying at Our House" is a World War I era song released in 1917. The lyrics were written by Thomas Hoier and Bernie Grossman. Al W. Brown composed the music. It was published by Joe Morris Music Co. of New York, New York. The Starmer Brothers designed the art on the sheet music, on the cover of which are soldiers marching down a street. Crowds of people cheer them on and service flags wave above them.

The song has a prideful tone. It is told from the point of view of someone who has a family member in the military. Although the narrator states that "hearts may ache", they are proud to fly the service flag because of what it represents. As explained by Frederick G. Vogel in the book, World War I Songs, the song "...submerged in an excess of patriotism that tended to equate a family's love of country with the number of male relatives serving in the armed forces". Mothers were being applauded for giving up their sons to war, as evidenced by this song.
