= Afghanistan (song) =

1920 song written by Harry Donnelly and William A. Wilander

Song
- Released: 1920
- Genre: Foxtrot
- Label: Gilbert & Friedland Inc.
- Songwriters: Harry Donnelly and William A. Wilander

Audio sample
- "Afghanistan" sung by the Premier-American Quartet with orchestral accompaniment in 1920: file; help

"Afghanistan" is a popular song written by Harry Donnelly and William A. Wilander and published by Gilbert & Friedland Inc. in 1920. It has notably been recorded by Zez Confrey, Prince's Dance Orchestra, and the Lopez and Hamilton's Kings of Harmony.

== Writing and composition ==
The song was written by Harry Donnelly and William A. Wilander. It tells a story about Afghanistan of an Afghan Hindu woman and a man seeking to marry her, evoking imagery of elephants, temples, and the Afghan landscape. The cover art was drawn by noted sheet music cover artists the Starmers.

== See also ==
- "The Japanese Sandman", contemporaneous song with a similar theme about Japan
