= Ethel Paxson =

American painter (1885-1982)

- Born: Ethel Gould Easton; March 23, 1885; Meriden, Connecticut
- Died: July 5, 1982 (aged 97); Essex, Connecticut
- Known for: Painting
- Movement: American Impressionism
- Spouses: 1905: Clement Esmond Paxson (1878–1962) 1971: Chester Henry DuClos (1902–1993)

Ethel Easton Paxson (née Ethel Gould Easton; 23 March 1885 Meridian, Connecticut – 5 July 1982 Essex, Connecticut) was an American painter.

== Early years ==
Paxson was born on March 23, 1885 in Meriden, Connecticut. She studied at the Corcoran School of Art in Washington, D.C. and the Pennsylvania Academy of the Fine Arts in Philadelphia. She also was a student at Shinnecock Hills Summer School of Art where she studied with William Merritt Chase.

On March 23, 1905, she married Clement Esmond Paxson (1878–1962) in Meriden, Connecticut at St. Paul's Universalist Church, who, at the time, was an electrical engineer and Chief Engineer for the Chesapeake & Potomac Telephone Company of Washington, D.C. In 1916, she accompanied her husband in Rio de Janeiro, Brazil, on his assignment as chief engineer with Stone & Webster to install lines there. During that time, four years, she painted countryside and seashore scenes and became one of the first American Impressionist artists to paint there. On November 20, 1971, in Killingworth, Connecticut, Ethel Paxson married again to widower Chester Henry DuClos (1902–1993). Ethel DuClos died July 5, 1982, in Essex, Connecticut.

Her work is in the Metropolitan Museum of Art and the Florence Griswold Museum.

== Songwriting ==
Ethel Paxson, writing under the pseudonym Lettie Gould, composed music and wrote song lyrics. Between 1910 and 1916, Church, Paxson & Company published several works credited to Gould, including seven for which she was the lyricist and two compositions, "Evening Prayer" and "Love's Whispering Waltzes."

== Bibliography ==
=== Sources ===
- Riley, Carolyn (ed.). Contemporary Authors – A Bio-Bibliographical Guide to Current Authors and Their Work. Gale Research Company. ISBN 978-0-8103-0010-1, 0-8103-0010-9; OCLC 462766635, 867423101, 462766635, 320439807, 635040583.
1. Volumes 25–28: "Paxson, Ethel 1885". 1971. p. 562.
  1. Via Internet Archive (Lourds High School → De La Salle School → acquired via Elementary and Secondary Education Act, Title II, Chicago Board of Education).
- Smithsonian. "Ethel Paxson papers". Archives of American Art. OCLC 1030332338.
