= Salute the Flag: March & Two-Step =

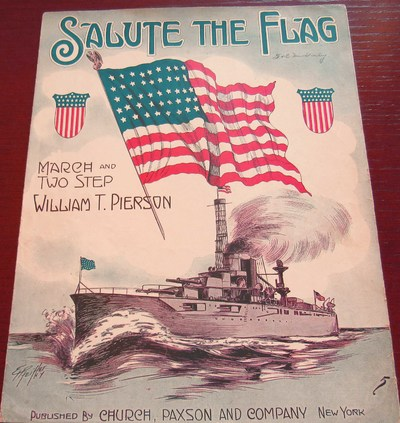
- Sheet music cover

Song
- Published: 1914
- Genre: Military march
- Songwriter: William T. Pierson

"Salute the Flag", march & two-step is a World War I song written and composed by William "Will" Thomas Pierson, Jr. (1879–1936). It was published in 1914 by Church, Paxson & Company, in New York, NY. This song is written in the style of a march and two-step.

== Description ==
The sheet music cover, illustrated by Pfeiffer, depicts a battleship speeding across the ocean. The sheet music can be found at the Pritzker Military Museum & Library, as well as The University of Maine.
