= Zez Confrey =

American composer and pianist (1895–1971)

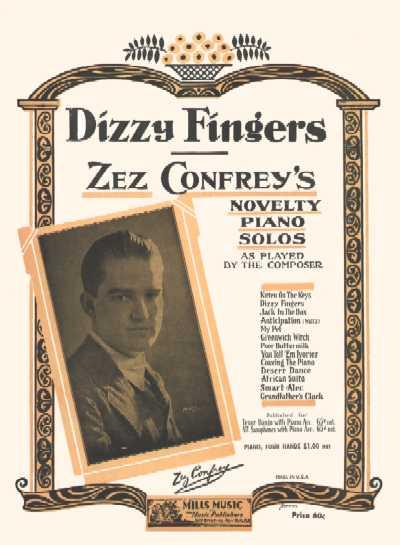
The sheet music for "Dizzy Fingers"

Edward Elzear "Zez" Confrey (3 April 1895 – 22 November 1971) was an American composer and performer of novelty piano and jazz music. His most noted works were "Kitten on the Keys" and "Dizzy Fingers." Studying at the Chicago Musical College and becoming enthralled by French impressionists played a critical role in how he composed and performed music.

== Early life and education ==
Confrey was born in Peru, Illinois, the youngest child of Thomas and Margaret Confrey. Aspiring to be a concert pianist, he attended Chicago Musical College and studied with private teachers. He later abandoned that idea for composing, encouraged by his oldest brother, James J. Confrey, an organist. By 1916 he was a staff pianist for Witmarks in Chicago. He also enlisted in the US Navy in 1917.

== Career ==
"Afghanistan" (1920)
Piano roll from 1920 of Confrey playing "Afghanistan"

"Kitten on the Keys" (1921)
Confrey's first hit, "Kitten on the Keys", performed by him

After World War I, Confrey became a pianist and arranger for the QRS piano roll company. He also recorded for AMPICO's reproducing piano system, which was installed in upper-line pianos such as Mason & Hamlin and Chickering.

In 1921 Confrey wrote his novelty piano solo "Kitten on the Keys", inspired by hearing his grandmother's cat walk on the keyboard of her piano. It became a hit, and he went on to compose many other pieces in the genre. "Dizzy Fingers" (1923) was Confrey's other biggest seller.

Following the 1920s, Confrey focused primarily on composing for jazz bands. He retired after World War II but continued to compose until 1959. He died at age 76 in Lakewood, New Jersey after suffering for many years from Parkinson's disease. He left behind more than a hundred piano works, songs and miniature operas, and numerous piano rolls, music publications and sound recordings.

Writing in 2007 David A. Jasen describes Confrey, alongside Roy Bargy, as still "firmly rooted in the folk tradition".

== List of known works ==
For piano unless otherwise indicated.

- "Afghanistan" (1920)
- "My Pet" (1921)
- "Kitten on the Keys" (1921)
- "You Tell 'em Ivories" (1921)
- "Poor Buttermilk" (1921)
- "Greenwich Witch" (1921)
- "Kitten on the Keys" - song (1922)
- "Stumbling" (1922)
- "Stumbling – Paraphrase" (1922)
- "Coaxing the Piano" (1922)
- "Dumbell" (1922)
- "Tricks" (1922)
- "By the Saphire Sea" - Song (1922)
- "Nickel in the Slot" (1923)
- "Dizzy Fingers" (1923)
- "Three Little Oddities" (1923) (for piano or violin and piano)
  - "Impromptu"
  - "Romanza"
  - "Novelette"
- "African Suite" (1924)
  - "High Hattin'"
  - "Kinda Careless"
  - "Mississippi Shivers"
- "Anticipation" (1924)
- "Charleston Chuckles" (1925)
- "Fantasy – Jazz Arrangement" (1925)
- "Humorestless" (1925)
- "Flower Song" (1925)
- "Spring Song" (1925)
- "Home Sweet Home" (1925)
- "Melody in F" (1925)
- "Traumerei" (1925)
- "Fantasy – Classical" (1926)
- "Jay Walk" (1927)
- "Jack in the Box" (1927)
- "Walse Mirage" (1927)
- "Sparkling Waters" (1928)
- "Concert Etude" (1929)
- "Heaven's Garden" (1931)
- "Heaven's Garden – Song" (1931)
- "Moods of a New Yorker" (1932)
  - "At Dusk"
  - "Movie Ballet"
  - "Relaxation"
  - "After Theatre – Tango"
- "Buffoon" (1932)
- "Champagne" (1932)
- "Desert Dance" (1932)
- "In the South of France" (1932)
- "Indian Prayer" (1932)
- "Phantom Cadets" (1932)
- "Wistfullness" (1932)
- "Grandfather's Clock" (1933)
- "Sittin' on a Log Pettin' My Dog" (1933)
- "Smart Alec" (1933)
- "Giddy Ditty" (1935)
- "Rhythm Venture" (1935)
- "Arabian Maid" (1935)
- "A Heart Like the Ocean" (1935)
- "Lullaby from Mars" (1935)
- "Mouses' Hooves" (1935)
- "Tin Pan Symphony" (1935)
- "The Birds' Carnival" (1935)
- "Blue Tornado" (1935)
- "Rag Doll Dimples" (1935)
- "Audacity" (1936)
- "Meandering" (1936)
- "Tap Dance of the Chimes" (1936)
- "Ultra-Ultra" (1936)
- "Oriental Fantasy" (1936)
- "Home-Run on the Keys" (1936)
- "Midsummer's Nightmare" (1936)
- "Motif Du Concert" (1936)
- "Wise Cracker Suite" (1936)
  - "Yokel Opus"
  - "Mighty Lackawanna"
  - "The Sheriff's Lament"
- "Sugar Dance" (1936)
- "Sunshine from the Fingers" (1936)
- "Sport Model Encore" (1937)
- "The Hobble De Hoy" (1938)
- "Della Robbia" (1938)
- "That Old Piano Roll Band" (1943)
- "Dancing Shadow" (1944)
- "Elihu's Harmonica" (1944)
- "Parade of the Jumping Beans" (1944)
- "Pickle Pepper Polka" (1944)
- "Tune For Mademoiselle" (1944)
- "Amazonia" (1945)
- "Butterfly" (1945)
- "Flutter By, Butterfly" (1945)
- "Rag Doll Carnival" (1945)
- "Four Candy Pieces" (1949)
- "Song of Thanksgiving" (1952)
- "Four Circus Pieces" (1959)
- "Fourth Dimension" (1959)

== Selected discography ==
- Zez Confrey: Creator of the Novelty Rag, Zez Confrey (1976)
- The Dancing Twenties, Various Artists (1976)
- The Piano Roll Artistry of Zez Confrey, Zez Confrey (1982)
- Kitten on the Keys: The Piano Music of Zez Confrey, (1983, Dick Hyman)

== See also ==
- List of ragtime composers

== Notes ==
- Rags and Ragtime by Jasen and Tichenor, Dover, 1978.
