= William Henry Santelmann =

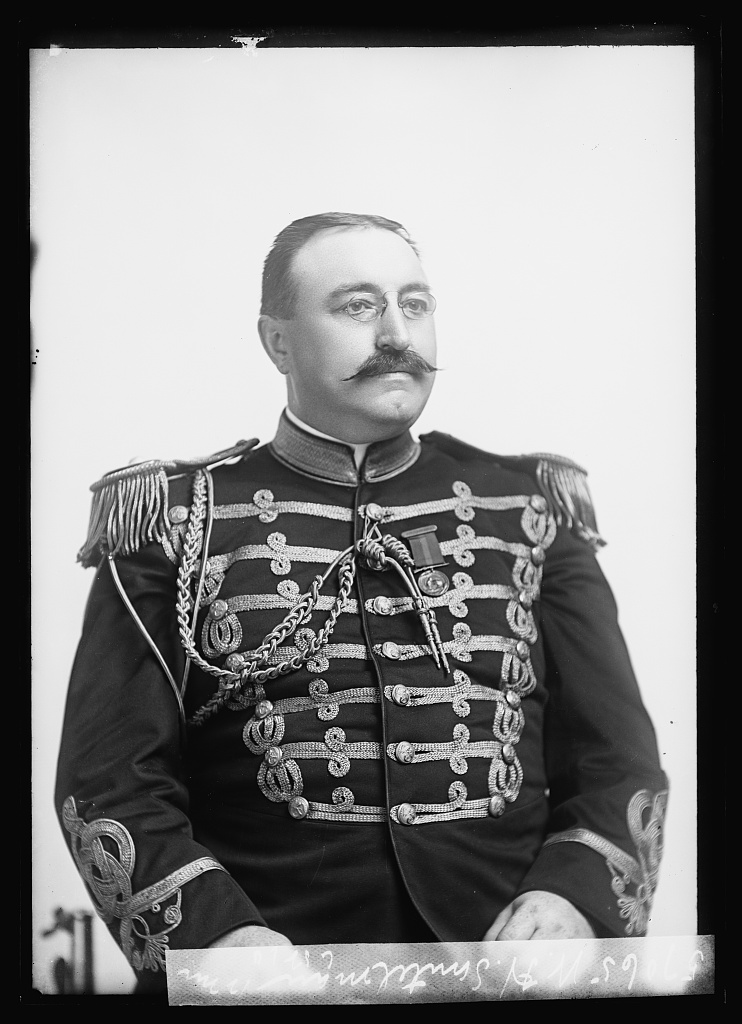
- Santelmann, c. 1906

18th Director of the United States Marine Band
- In office 1898 – May 1, 1927
- Preceded by: Francesco Fanciulli
- Succeeded by: Taylor Branson

Personal details
- Born: September 23, 1863 Offensen, Kingdom of Hanover
- Died: December 17, 1932 (aged 69) Chevy Chase, Maryland, United States

William Henry Christian Santelmann (September 24, 1863 – December 17, 1932) was a director of the United States Marine Band.

== Biography ==
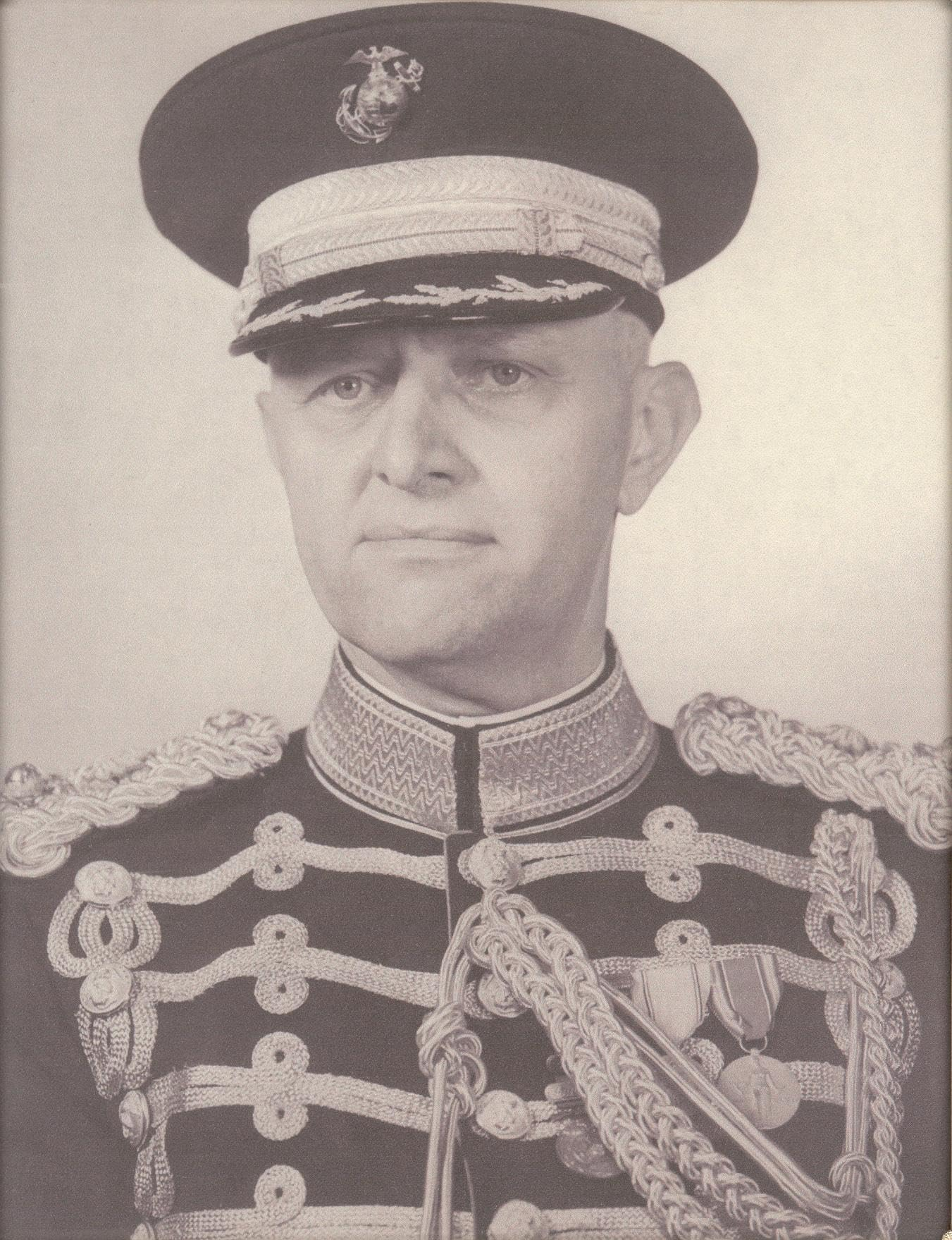
his youngest son, COL. William F. Santelmann, who also became the Director of "The President's Own" United States Marine Band

He was born on September 24, 1863, in Offensen, Kingdom of Hanover. He studied violin and clarinet and at age 15, in 1878 composed his first music. His youngest son was William Frederick Santelmann (1902–1984) who would eventually be the 21st Director of the United States Marine Band.

In 1887 he auditioned on the violin, clarinet and baritone for the United States Marine Band “The President’s Own” for none other than John Philip Sousa and was accepted on all three instruments officially joining the band on Sept. 24, 1887. Nov. 10, 1888 he married Clara Auguste Sophia Becke (1861–1932), originally from Isle of Rügen, Germany, at the Concordia Lutheran Church in Washington, D.C. In 1895 he left the band to work with the Lafayette Theater Orchestra and soon formed his own orchestra. Due to his orchestra's quality and excellence he was approached to return to the Marine Band as its leader.

William was director of the United States Marine Band starting in 1898 when he replaced Francesco Fanciulli. On March 3, 1898, William H. Santelmann became the 19th Director of the United States Marine Band “The President’s Own” slightly preceding the Spanish-American War. When he became leader he initiated many new ideas including the creation of the US Marine Symphony Orchestra. He also insisted that all incoming band members must know how to play at least two instruments - one orchestral, the other band. This was so that if there was an official engagement outside and the weather turned bad, the orchestra would take over the musical performance inside.

Santelmann demanded discipline and training and when quality improved enough, performances at the White House resumed in 1902. The improved group soon became in demand to perform at other vocations than just the White House. In 1916 a daily log was started to keep track of all the band's activities which could include many concerts in a week, regular concerts at the White House and a series of weekly radio broadcasts in 1922. Before, during and after World War I, the band/orchestra made many trips to the White House to perform for visiting dignitaries.

He retired on May 1, 1927, and was replaced by Taylor Branson. He was then commissioned a captain in the United States Marine Corps. To date, he is the longest serving Director with 29 years of service. He died on December 17, 1932, in Chevy Chase, Maryland. He was buried in Arlington National Cemetery.

== Bibliography ==
- Matthias Blazek: Eine außergewöhnliche Karriere: Offenser wandert 1887 in USA aus und wird Leiter der berühmten United States Marine Band, Sachsenspiegel, Cellesche Zeitung, 15 July 2023
