= The Ponce Sisters =

American sibling singing duo (1920s–1930s)

- Years active: 1920s–1930s
- Past members: Ethel Helen Ponce; Dorothea Ponce

The Ponce Sisters, comprising Ethel Helen (August 4, 1907, in the Bronx – September 24, 1989, in Ohio) and Dorothea (a.k.a. Dobbie; December 30, 1909, in Boston – December 25, 2000, in Cincinnati), were a popular sister singing duo in the mid-1920s and early 1930s.

== Early life ==
Ethel Helen and Dorothea were the daughters of Phil Ponce (born Philip Leo Ponce; 1886–1945), a composer, author, publisher, radio executive, and music entrepreneur, and Ethel M. Fernandez (1887–1921), a pianist who, among other things, performed in vaudeville and recorded piano rolls. Phil was the first agent-manager for Fats Waller in 1932. Ethel and Dorothea were also granddaughters of John Henry Ponce (1857–1910), a lawyer and politician from Boston.

== Career ==
The duo sang on radio programs, including the Old Gold Paul Whiteman Hour, sometimes with co-star Bing Crosby, and with Fred Waring's Pennsylvanians. The sisters performed in Manhattan theaters and toured the vaudeville circuit. In 1930, they appeared in three short films produced by MGM Studios.

The sisters recorded from 1925 to 1932 for the Columbia, Gennett, Cameo, Perfect, and Edison record labels. They recorded under the names Phil Dorothea and Ethel Ponce and as The Ponce Sisters. Although they were not jazz singers, they did record in 1932 with jazz legends Eddie Lang (guitar), Jimmy Dorsey (cornet), and Joe Venuti (violin).

Ethel, in addition to singing, played piano on some recordings. During the sisters' 1930s NBC radio network broadcasts, Ethel often augmented their vocal duets with solo piano performances of popular tunes and serious works. She was a respected composer (under the name Ethel Ponce Fenley) of piano novelties, such as "Holiday," "Blue Haze," and "Happy Landing. She wrote and performed commercial jingles for such products as Bavarian Beer and the Yellow Pages. She was represented as a composer by ASCAP.

The Ponce Sisters appeared in the 1933 movie Supper at Six, produced by Universal Pictures.

In 1935, the Ponce Sisters stopped performing as a duo following Ethel's marriage. Dorothea continued as a soloist on the Cincinnati radio station WLW until 1937, when she married Ohio industrialist J. Richard Verkamp. In the 1950s, Ethel performed several of her compositions with the Cincinnati Symphony Orchestra.

Decades later, MGM / United Artists released Dawn of Sound, Volume 3, a laser disc set of early talkies (sound films). It features Vitaphone shorts of the Ponce Sisters singing "Ten Little Miles from Town" and "Oh, You Have No Idea".

== Historical audio ==
- "You've Got Everything," sung by Ethel and Dorothea Ponce on radio station WLW, Cincinnati, ca. 1932
- Audio of two 1925 Ponce Sisters recordings ("Let's Wander Away" and "Someone is Losin' Susan") for Edison Records
