= Abe Lyman =

American bandleader (1897–1957)

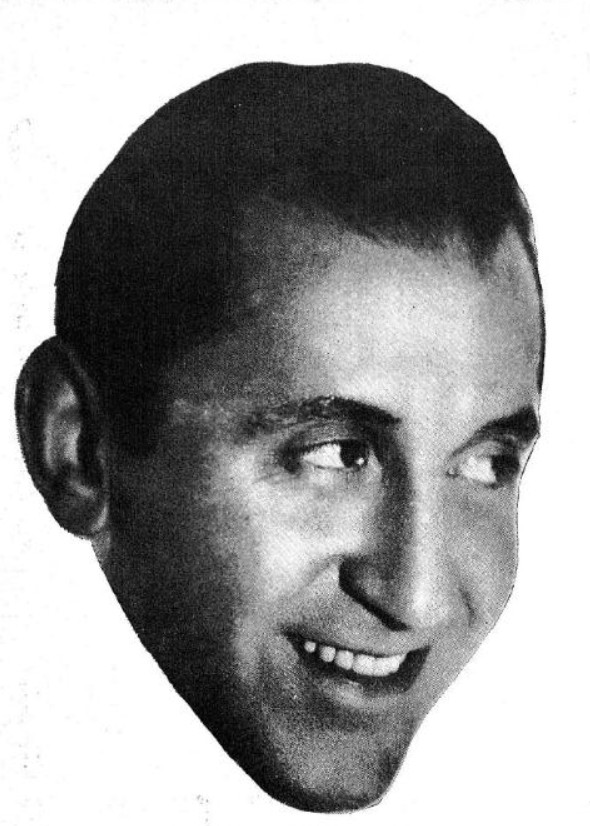
- Lyman, 1942

Background information
- Born: Abraham Simon; August 4, 1897; Chicago, Illinois, U.S.
- Died: October 23, 1957 (aged 60) Beverly Hills, California
- Genre: Jazz
- Occupations: Musician, bandleader
- Instrument: Drums
- Years active: 1911–1947
- Labels: Nordskog, Brunswick, Decca, Victor

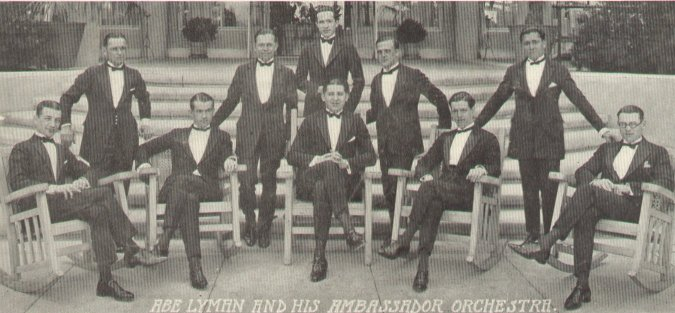
Abe Lyman's Orchestra in 1922

Abe Lyman (born Abraham Simon; August 4, 1897 – October 23, 1957) was a bandleader from the 1920s to the 1940s. He made recordings, appeared in films and provided the music for numerous radio shows, including Your Hit Parade.

== Biography ==
Born in Chicago, Illinois, on August 4, 1897, to an Ashkenazi Jewish immigrant family, Lyman's name at birth was Abraham Simon. He and his brother, Mike, changed their last name to Lyman because they both thought it sounded better. Abe learned to play the drums when he was young, and at the age of 14 he had a job as a drummer in a Chicago café. Around 1919, he was regularly playing music with two other notable future big band leaders, Henry Halstead and Gus Arnheim, in California.

In Los Angeles Mike Lyman opened the Sunset, a night club popular with such film stars as Mary Pickford, Norma Talmadge, Charlie Chaplin, Buster Keaton, and Harold Lloyd. When Abe's nine-piece band first played at the Sunset, it was a success, but the club closed after celebrities signed contracts stating they were not to be seen at clubs.

For an engagement at the Cocoanut Grove in The Ambassador Hotel on April 1, 1922, Abe added a violinist and saxophonist. Opening night drew a large crowd of 1500 guests in the Cocoanut Grove, plus another 500 more outside.

Lyman appeared on radio as early as 1922. His orchestra was broadcast from The Ambassador Hotel by late March on KOG.

After the band cut their first record under the local label Nordskog Records, they moved a year later to Brunswick Records in the summer of 1923. There they made many recordings and were one of Brunswick's leading orchestras through 1935, when Lyman signed to Decca Records. In late 1937, Lyman signed with Victor where he was assigned their Bluebird label. He recorded prolifically for them through 1942. The Lyman Orchestra toured Europe in 1929, appearing at the Kit Cat Club and the Palladium in London and at the Moulin Rouge and the Perroquet in Paris. Lyman and his orchestra were featured in a number of early talkies, including Hold Everything (1930), Paramount on Parade (1930), Good News (1930) and Madam Satan (1930). In 1931, Abe Lyman and his orchestra recorded a number of soundtracks for the Merrie Melodies cartoon series. Notable musicians in the Lyman Orchestra included Ray Lopez, Gussie Mueller, and Orlando "Slim" Martin. Charlie Chaplin guest-conducted the band in two occasions: in 1923 and 1926, in both cases recording songs written by Chaplin himself.

During the 1930s, the Lyman Orchestra was heard regularly on such shows as Accordiana and Waltz Time every Friday evening and on NBC, Coast to Coast. Under the name "Rose Blane", Lyman's wife was vocalist with the band during this period. Lyman and his orchestra sat in for Phil Harris on the Jack Benny program in 1943 when Harris served in the Merchant Marines. After the end of the recording ban, Lyman briefly switched to Columbia in 1945, making his final records for that label.

When Lyman was 50 years old, he left the music industry and went into the restaurant management business. He died in Beverly Hills, California at the age of 60.

== Popular Recordings ==
- "Midnight Rose" (vocal by Charles Kaley) (1923)
- "After I Say I'm Sorry" (vocal by Charles Kaley) (1926)
- "Mary Lou" (vocal by Charles Kaley) (1926)
- "There's a Blue Ridge in My Heart, Virginia"(vocal by Charles Kaley) (1926)
- "Just a Bird's Eye View (of My Old Kentucky Home)" (vocal Frank Sylvano) (1927)
- "Sweethearts on Parade" (vocal Phil Neely) (1929)
- "Just One More Chance" (vocal Phil Neely) (1931)
- "Little Old Lady" (vocal by Sonny Schuyler) (1937)
- "Amen" (vocal Rose Blane) (1942)
- "Rum and Coca Cola" (vocal Rose Blane) (1945)
