= International Encyclopedia of Women Composers =

1981 book by Aaron I. Cohen

- The covers of the two volumes of the second edition
- Language: English
- Subject: Women composers
- Genre: Encyclopedia
- Publisher: R.R. Bowker
- Publication date: 1981
- Publication place: United States
- Pages: 597
- ISBN: 978-0-8352-1288-5
- Dewey Decimal: 780/.92/2 B
- LC Class: ML105 .C7

The International Encyclopedia of Women Composers is a 1981 reference book by Aaron I. Cohen which contains biographies of over 5,000 women composers from nearly 70 countries. It was put together when Cohen was retired in order to help fill a gap in the history of music. A second edition, consisting of two extended volumes, was published in 1987.

== Background ==
Cohen was a retired man in his sixties whose intentions were to fill a "significant gap in the history of music" and to be "liberal and inclusive" with the composers he chose. A small staff that he brought together helped him translate the text into 15 languages. The book was written partially in response to a comment by Thomas Beecham who said, "There are no women composers, never have been and possibly never will be." Little known composers that have an entry include Scottish composer Christine Morison, American composer Louise Talma, and sixth-century composer Hind Bind 'Utba. The first volume includes an entry titled "Notable Facts About Woman Composers". The first edition was 597 pages long with over 5,000 composers from nearly 70 countries and originally cost $135.

== Second edition ==
During the time the encyclopedia was being worked on, a similar directory was in the process of being put together by the Arts/Letters/Music Committee of the International Council of Women. The second edition was published in 1987 by combining entries from both the Council of Women and Cohen. The second edition consisted of two volumes and added 643 biographies of women composers who lived "behind the iron curtain", compositions by Arabian composers stretching over nine centuries, and 500 composers that were referred to as unknown in the first edition. Each biographical entry includes sources of information and lists the composer's discography. The majority of entries usually include a composer's biography, full name, birth date, death date, and a list of compositions. There are appendices that include composers who do not have much information written about them, tables of distributed works, pseudonyms of the composers, operas, and operettas.

== Reception ==
The encyclopedia was reviewed by The Library Quarterly in July 1982 and by the Music Library Association in 1983. It was listed in Women's Studies: A Recommended Bibliography with the statement, "This valuable reference work is highly recommended for academic libraries." Edward Rothstein of The New York Times wrote, "But the International Encyclopedia of Women Composers by Aaron I. Cohen, just published by R.R. Bowker, is the first extensive reference book of interest to anyone concerned with the history of female musical composition."
