= Sylvia Lent =

American violinist (1903–1972)

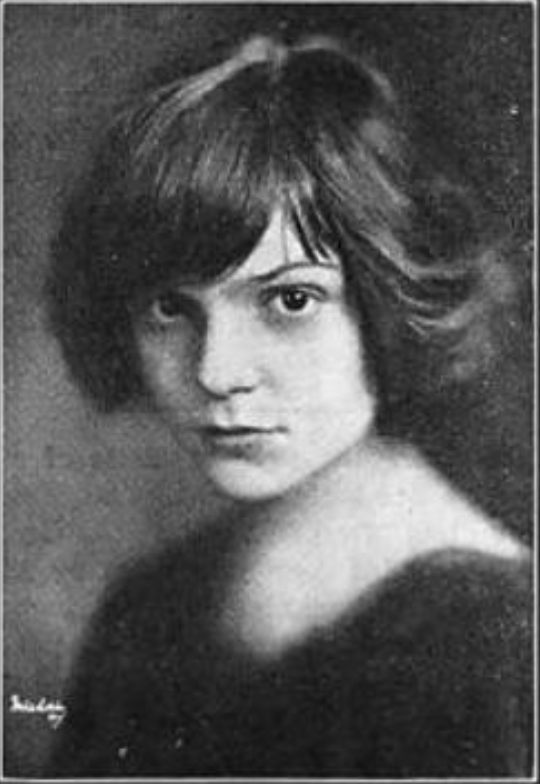
- Born: June 11, 1903; Washington, D.C., U.S.
- Died: March 25, 1972 (aged 68); San Francisco, California, U.S.
- Occupation: Violinist
- Years active: 1922
- Spouse: Alfred Frankenstein (m. 1935)
- Musical career
- Genre: Classical

Sylvia Lent (June 11, 1903 – March 25, 1972) was an American violinist.

== Early life ==
Sylvia Lent was born in Washington, D.C., the daughter of composer and cellist Ernest Lent, who was born and educated in Germany, and pianist Mary (Mamie) Simons Lent. She studied violin with her cousin, Gilbert Ross (their mothers were sisters), from childhood through studies in Chicago with Leopold Auer. Ross later became a music professor at Cornell University. Lent also studied with Ovide Musin and Franz Kneisel.

== Career ==
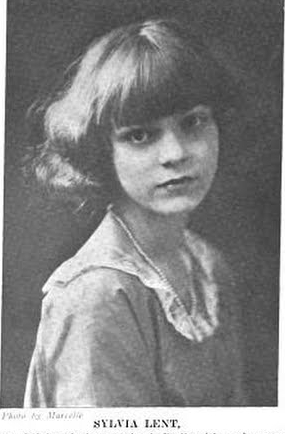
Lent, in a 1922 publication

Lent made her debut concert tour in Germany, playing in Berlin, Dresden, Leipzig, and Munich, in 1922. Her New York debut followed in March 1923. By age 23, she had been featured as a soloist with the Chicago Symphony Orchestra, the Detroit Symphony Orchestra, the State Symphony Orchestra of New York, and the New York Symphony Orchestra. She played a rare Domenico Montagnana violin made in 1735, a gift from a collector in Minnesota.

Her youthful appearance and small stature was frequently mentioned in reviews of her concerts, even when she was well into adulthood. "She is petite, sylph-like, with an almost childish face and head", mentioned one 1933 newspaper account, before describing her skills. In 1927, she was the youngest musician ever featured on The Atwater Kent Hour radio program. She made one recording for the Victor Talking Machine Company, in 1924.

== Personal life ==
Lent married the San Francisco Chronicle art and music critic Alfred Frankenstein in 1935. They had two sons, John and David, and lived in San Francisco, California. She died from a heart attack in 1972, aged 69, in San Francisco. Her granddaughter Karen Frankenstein is an opera singer.
