= Nordskog Records =

American jazz record label

Nordskog Records was a jazz record company and label founded by Andrae Nordskog in 1921 in Santa Monica, California.

The label's recording studio and factory were in Los Angeles. It issued 27 double-sided discs. It had no pressing plant, so it contracted with Arto Records of Orange, New Jersey. Wax masters were shipped across country by railroad; many melted on the trip across the desert. By some accounts among the recordings lost were sessions by Jelly Roll Morton and King Oliver.

Among the records which survived were the only recordings of Eva Tanguay, early sides by Abe Lyman's Orchestra, Henry Halstead's Orchestra, and a number of recordings by Kid Ory's band. The Ory sides were the first recorded jazz by an African American band from New Orleans.

In 1923, Arto filed for bankruptcy. Nordskog sued for the return of some 80 unissued masters, with mothers and stampers then in Arto's possession, but failed to regain anything. Nordskog went out of business.

The labels proclaim Nordskog records to be "The Golden-Voiced Records".

== See also ==
- List of record labels
