= James Francis Cooke =

American journalist

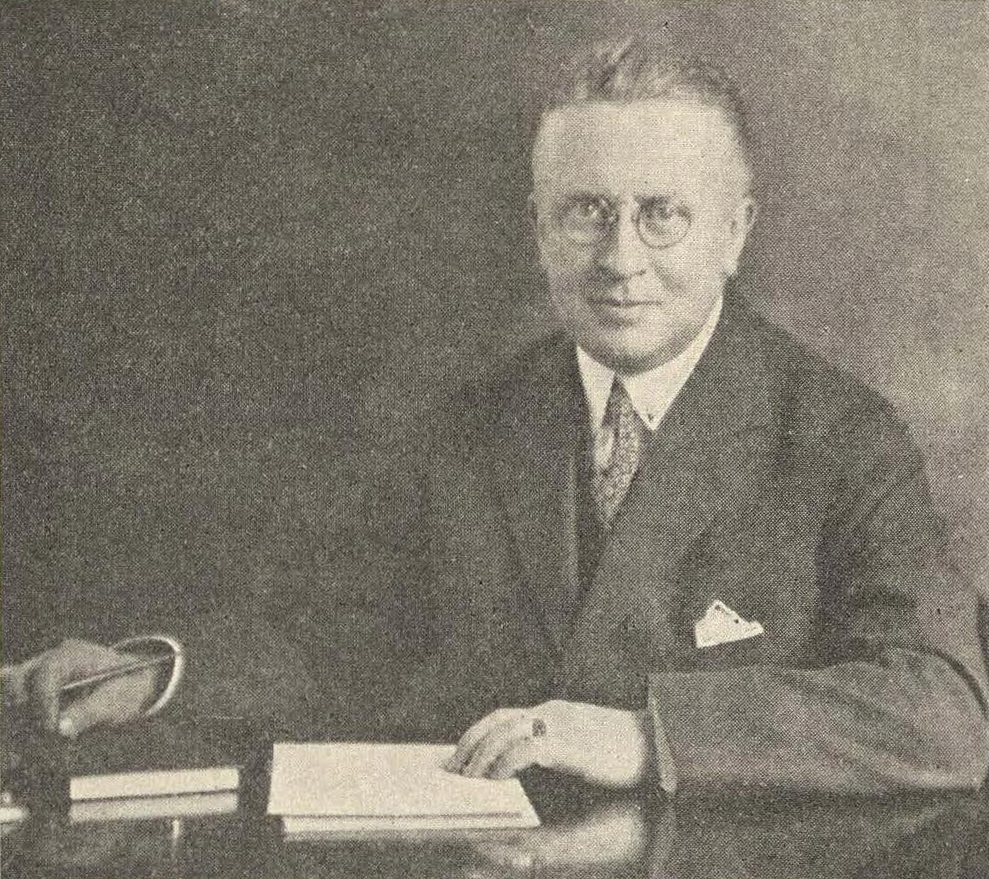
- James Francis Cooke as the editor of The Etude
- Born: November 14, 1875; Bay City, Michigan
- Died: March 3, 1960 (aged 84); Bala Cynwyd, Pennsylvania
- Citizenship: United States
- Education: Royal Conservatory in Wurzburg (Doctor of Music)
- Occupations: Author; journalist; editor; publisher; music teacher; pianist; composer
- Spouse: Betsey Ella Beckwith
- Children: Carol L. Cooke (died in childhood before 1910); Francis Sherman Cooke
- Writing career
- Subjects: Music history, music theory, musician features, classical music
- Notable works: The Etude; Great Pianists upon Piano-Playing; Great Singers on the Art of Singing; Mastering the Scales and Arpeggios
- Notable awards: 15 honorary degrees; French government made him a Chevalier of the Legion of Honor for his services in art, education and public affairs

James Francis Cooke (November 14, 1875, Bay City, Michigan – March 3, 1960, Bala Cynwyd, Pennsylvania) was an American music educator. He was a pianist, composer, playwright, journalist, author (including novels and of books on musical history and theory), a president of Theodore Presser music publishers from 1925 to 1936, and editor of The Etude music magazine from 1907 to 1950, or 1913 to 1956. He taught piano for more than twenty years in New York, led choral clubs and taught voice. He also gave music-topic lectures.

He was the president of the Philadelphia Music Teacher's Association for seven years. He was president of the Presser Foundation for 38 years. He was also a member of the American Society of Composers, Authors and Publishers, the Union League and the Sons of the American Revolution.

== Family ==
He married Betsey Ella Beckwith (born Toledo, Ohio, 1896) in 1899. She was a concert singer. They had two sons, Carol Lincoln Cooke (born 1900, died in childhood) and Francis Sherman Cooke (born 1905). The family was recorded in the U.S. Censuses, passport application and ship's travel logs (look at see also section for links).

== Education ==
Cooke was educated in the New York public schools at Brooklyn, including Boys High School. He studied music with R. Huntington Woodman, Walter Henry Hall, Charles Dunham, Dudley Buck, Ernst Eberhard and William Medorn in New York. He also studied at the Brooklyn Institute.

He attended the Royal Conservatory in Wurzburg, Germany in 1900. There he studied under Dr. K. Kliebert, Max Meyer-Olbersleben and music historian and composer Hermann Ritter.

He received his doctorate in music from the University of the State of New York in 1906. In 1919, he received a doctorate in music from the Ohio Northern University.

== John Philip Sousa ==
In the course of his interviewing and talking with the musicians of his day, Cooke became a "close friend and associate" with John Philip Sousa. As president of the Theodore Presser Company, Cooke published some of the Sousa's works. In 1924 he helped to increase the sales of one of Sousa's pieces by changing its name from March of the Mitten Men to Power and Glory - Fraternal March. He also wrote words to go with Sousa's A Serenade In Seville in 1924. Sousa visited him shortly before his death, and talked to him about the lack of religion in modern music as a failing. The two attended a play "If Booth Had Missed." Two days later, Sousa died of a heart attack.

== Composer ==
Three of his works were recorded and released by Victor Records. Ol' Car'lina (1921) featured soprano Amelita Galli-Curci doing a vocal solo, backed by orchestra. The Angelus (1926) featured a vocal solo by Elsie Baker, also backed by orchestra. Sea gardens (1929) had Rosario Bourdon playing with the Victor Symphonic Band.

Cooke composed for piano. Piano solos include: White Orchids (1941), Mountain Shower (1943), Roses at Dawn (1945), and Ballet Mignon (1948). He wrote the music and poem published together as Sea Gardens (1925). Wrote words to In a Garden Filled With Roses (1939) to a melody by Charles Wakefield Cadman.

== Author ==
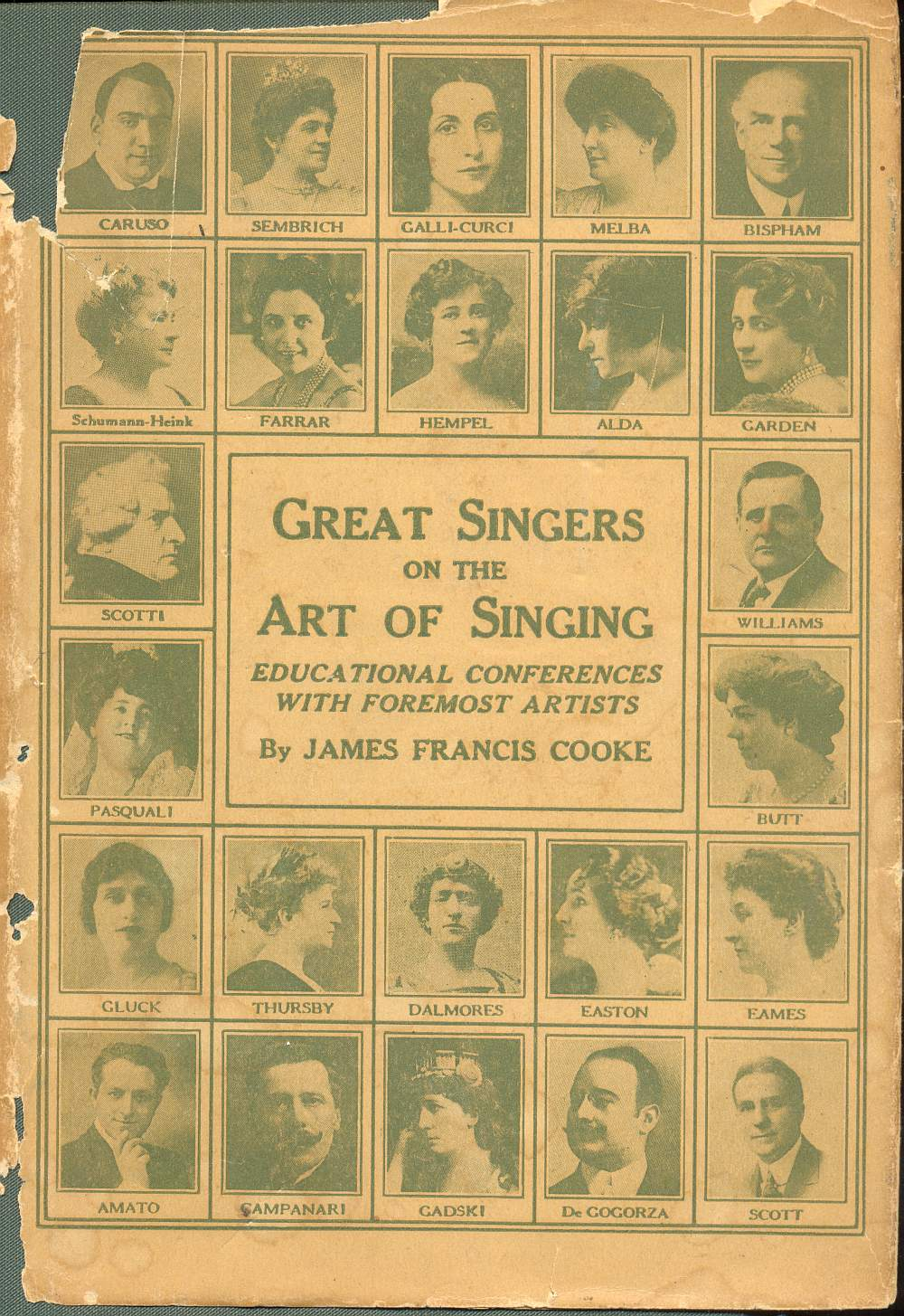
Dust cover to James Francis Cooke's book,Great Singers on the Art of Singing.

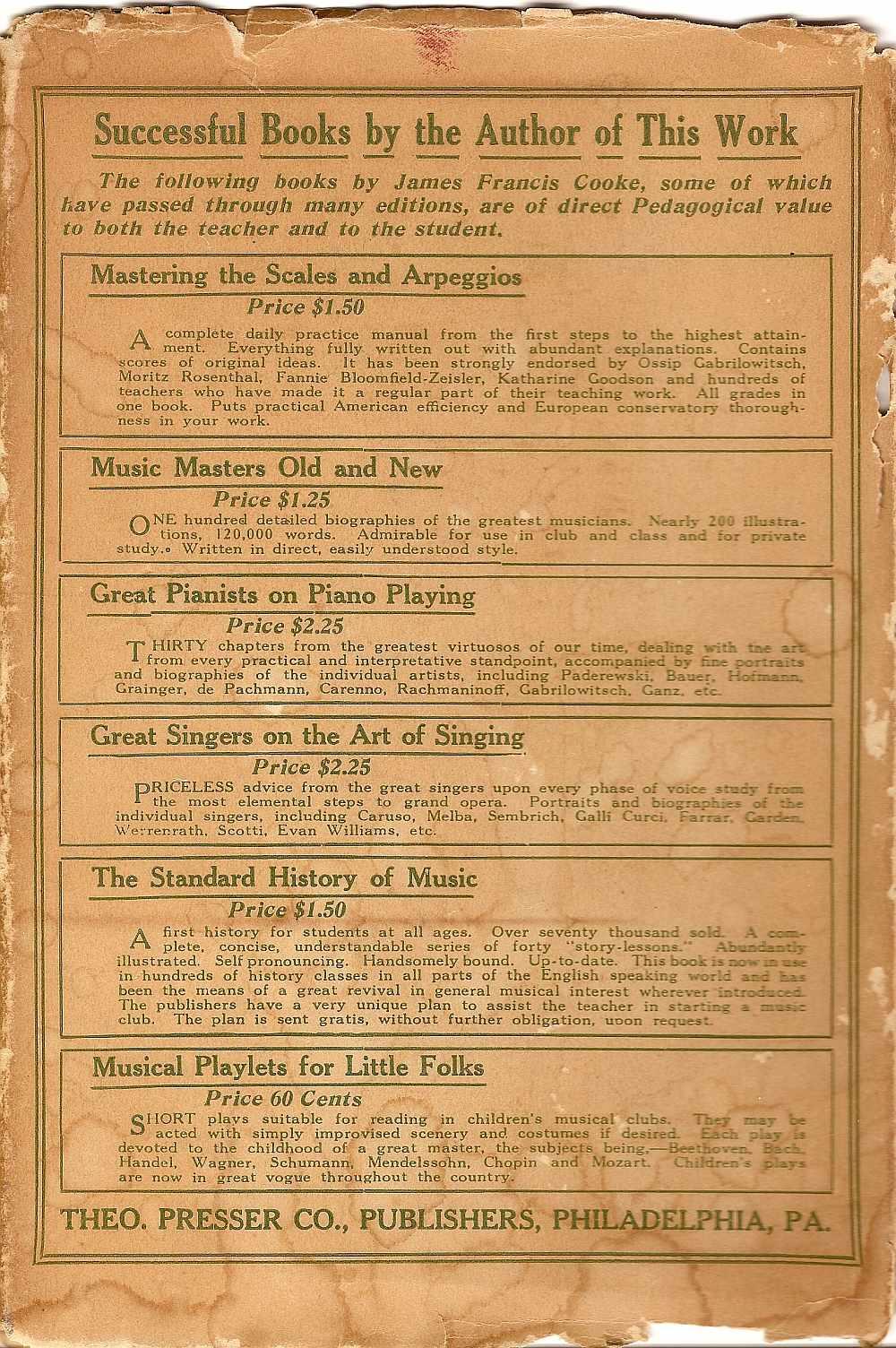
Books by James Francis Cooke, advertised at the rear of the dust cover to Great Singers on the Art of Singing.

He wrote the following books:

- Standard History of Music: A First History for Students of All Ages, 1910
- Great Pianists on Piano Playing, 1913 (first edition contained 21 chapters; second edition in 1917 contained 9 new chapters)
- Mastering the Scales and Arpeggios, 1913
- Musical Playlets, 1917
- Music-Masters Old and New.
- Great Singers on the Art of Singing
- Young Folks' Picture History of Music, 1925
- Master Study in Music
- A Fight in Defense of Music
- Musical travelogues; little visits to European musical shrines for the casual traveler, the music lover, the student and the teacher, 1934
- Musical plays for young folks: Scenes from the lives of the great composers, 1934
- How to Memorize Music 1948
