= William Austin Starmer =

British sheet music cover artist

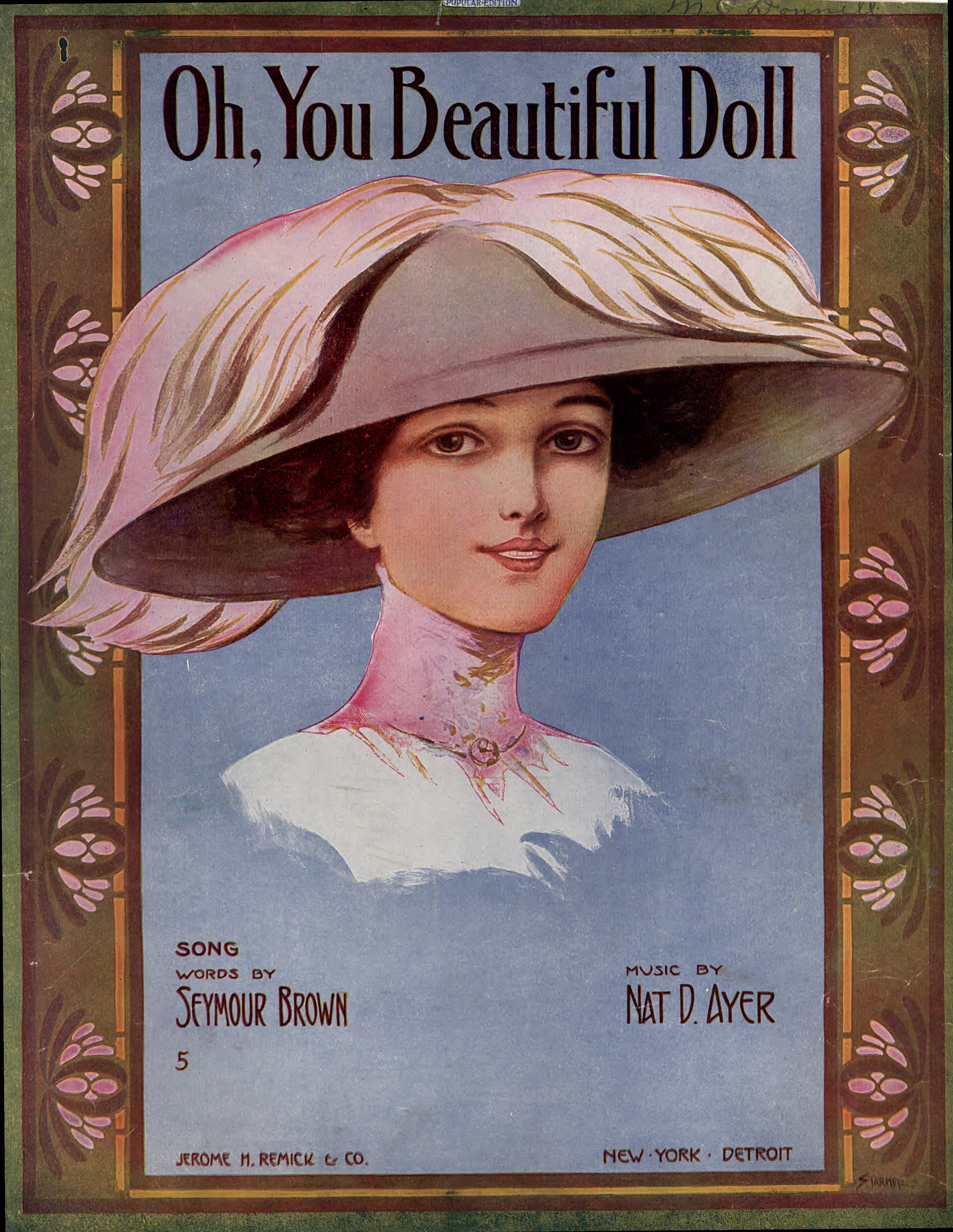
"Oh, You Beautiful Doll" sheet music cover (1911)

"Afghanistan" sheet music cover (1920)

The brothers William Austin Starmer (1872–1957) and Frederick Waite Starmer (1878–1962), both born in Leeds, were noted sheet music cover artists.

== Career ==
"Starmer" is a household name to collectors of sheet music and appears on innumerable covers dating from the early 1900s to the 1940s. Their work was of consistently high quality and they were turning out nearly a quarter of all large format covers from the late 1890s to around 1919. The identity of the artists was unknown until an invoice was discovered from William A. Starmer to the Jerome Remick Music Company, with a printed heading describing Starmer as artist and medical draughtsman.

They were sons of James Starmer, a shoemaker, married to Ann E. and living at 26 Woodsley Grove in Leeds. The couple had 3 sons and were still living at the same address with the 1891 census, with William recorded as a litho-artist.

- Edwin J. Starmer *1868
- William *March 1872
- Frederick *2 September 1878

William Starmer arrived in North America in 1898, with Frederick following two years later. William made a return trip to England in June 1900 to marry Julitta M. Dawson, with the entire family, parents James and Ann, and William and Julitta, arriving from Liverpool on 10 June 1904 aboard the Carpathia. William and Frederick made frequent visits to England until 1924, when they became naturalised. The 1910 U.S. Census lists the family as living in Long Island, William being noted as a commercial artist and Frederick an illustrator. William and Julitta had a son named William J. in 1907, who is not reflected in the census. The 1920 census records the two brothers on West 91st Street with Julitta, who died shortly after on 26 February 1922.

The 1930 census records William Starmer as having in 1925 taken a new wife, Edith Mary, born 1871, an Englishwoman who came to North America with her family in 1877. William and Edith were living at 2734 8th Street in Queens, and later, in the 1930s, at 27-34 8th Street, Astoria, Long Island. Frederick Starmer is not recorded in the 1930 census.

== Gallery ==
A Stubborn Cinderella (1908)

Moving Day in Jungle Town (1909)

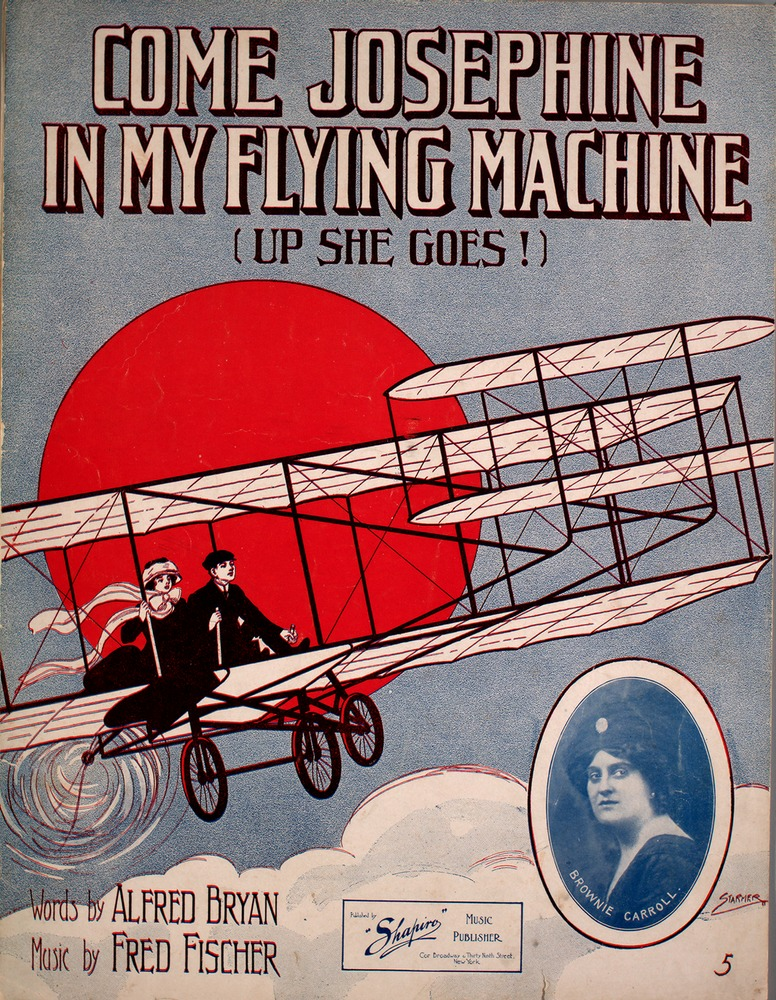
Come Josephine In My Flying Machine (1910)

Through the Clouds (1913)
