= Sam Fox Publishing Company =

American music publishing house

- Status: Defunct
- Founded: 1906; 119 years ago
- Founder: Sam Fox
- Country of origin: United States
- Headquarters location: Cleveland, Ohio
- Publication types: Sheet music
- Fiction genres: Film scores

The Sam Fox Publishing Company was an American music publishing house, founded in 1906 by Sam Fox of Cleveland, Ohio. The company was the first to publish original film scores in the United States, and was the publisher of numerous artists and international hit songs.

== Founding ==
The company began in 1906, when at age 25, Sam Fox borrowed $300 to start the company he first called Sandbox Music Publishing. At the same time as the company's founding, construction of Cleveland's Hippodrome Theatre had just been completed where John Stepan Zamecnik was named music director. Zemecnik began writing original music scores for the films shown at the Hippodrome, which Fox published. The business arrangement between Fox and Zamecnik flourished and the music director became the major composer and music director for Fox's publishing company.

== Association with Zamecnik ==
Almost immediately, Fox and Zamecnik began a collaboration that resulted in a prolific output of music. Zamecnik used more than twenty pseudonyms in penning his songs, giving the impression that the publishing company was a large company. In 1908, Sam Fox Publishing Company released a march by Zamecnik entitled "The College Yell" which may have led to an association nine years later, when Fox became the exclusive publisher for the man known as the March King, John Philip Sousa. That working relationship continued until Sousa's death in 1934. Publication of the Zamecnik scores ran the extent of the silent film era (1913–1928) and the music was played in film theaters across the United States on a daily basis for more than a decade. The Fox-Zamecnik collaboration resulted in the publication of more than 2,000 compositions.

== Expansion ==
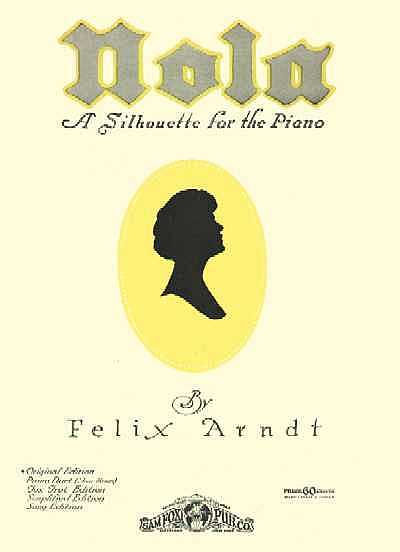
"Nola" sheet music cover.

The 1915 piano novelty "Nola," by Felix Arndt became an international hit, and by 1918, Sam Fox Publishing Company offerings could be found in newspapers in both the United States and Canada, in advertisements claiming "Leading Dealers sell Sam Fox Music of Merit." "Kisses", Valse D'Amour by J.S. Zamecnik was listed as one of two successes that should be in "every home." Zamecnik's "Neapolitan Nights" also met with major success, as did "Lady of Spain," penned by Erell Reaves and Tolchard Evans in 1931.

Even as early as the release of "Nola," the Sam Fox Publishing Company logo featured the tag line, "Established Throughout The World," and listed offices and representatives in New York, London, Paris, Berlin, Melbourne, and "other Important Centers." The New York office was headed in later years by Sam Fox's son Frederick, who had worked at the office at 202 The Arcade, Cleveland until after 1942.

The company's musical score publishing for Hollywood films was solidified with contracts with Fox Films and Movietone News as their exclusive musical producer. The Hollywood film work led to his publication of songs in Fox films, including "On the Good Ship Lollipop" and Animal Crackers in My Soup sung by Shirley Temple. Sam Fox Publishing Company entered the Broadway field in 1947 with the publication of the musical score for the award-winning film "Brigadoon" and the score for "Man of La Mancha."

Sam Fox Publishing Company ranked among the top ten musical publishers in the United States by the middle of the 20th century. The company became Sam Fox Publishing Company, Inc. on January 22, 1953, when it was incorporated in the state of New York.
