= Skály =

Skály may refer to places in the Czech Republic:

- Skály (Písek District), a municipality and village in the South Bohemian Region
- Skály (Strakonice District), a municipality and village in the South Bohemian Region
- Skály, a village and part of Horní Město in the Moravian-Silesian Region
- Skály, a village and part of Teplice nad Metují in the Hradec Králové Region
