= Stanley J. Damerell =

English lyricist (1878–1951)

- Born: John Edward Stanley Stevens; 1 July 1878; Fulham, London
- Died: 12 December 1951 (aged 73); Teddington, England
- Occupations: Composer; songwriter; lyricist
- Years active: 1920s–1940s
- Known for: Popular songs, vaudeville

Stanley J. Damerell (aka Jack Stevens aka John Edward Stanley Damerell Stevens; né John Edward Stanley Stevens; 1 July 1878 – 12 December 1951) was, in his early life (1900s through to the early 1920s), a British vaudevillian actor, writer, and producer, and in his later life (from the 1920s until his death), a prolific lyricist, and, to a lesser degree, composer of popular songs.

== Early life ==
Damerell was born in Fulham, London.

== Career ==
As a writer and producer of vaudevillian revues, Damerell collaborated with Cecil Rutland. Their productions were billed under the name, Damerell and Rutland.

In 1921, composer Tolchard Evans, and his regular lyricists, Damerell and Robert Joseph Hargreaves (1893–1934), along with Harry Tilsley (né Henry B. Tilsley), formed the Cecil Lennox Music Company to publish their songs. Damerell and Hargreaves sometimes used the pseudonym Erell Reaves – an amalgamation of the last five letters of Damerell and the last six letters of Hargreaves. Damerell is the maiden name of Stanley's mother, Eliza Stevens. Stanley J. Damerell also, in 1932, published music under the pseudonym Robert Stanley, and in 1935, Stan Merrell.

Damerell also collaborated with John Neat (1876–1949), who sometimes used the pseudonym Lilian Ray.

== Affiliations ==
- Member, Music Hall Artists' Railway Association, founded February 2, 1897, in London, which negotiated concessions on rail fares for travelling performers
- Member, Grand Order of Water Rats, served as King Rat in 1937
- Member, Variety Artistes' Federation, organisation of English vaudeville artists

== Personal life and death ==
On 4 August 1902, Damerell married Violet Eva Walter (1882–1974), an actress, in St Pancras. In January 1918 he married "Noel" Burningham (née Irene Victoria Burningham; 1887–1969) in Camberwell, whose married name was Irene Victoria Stevens. She had been a member of the Grand Order of Lady Ratlings.

Damerell died in Teddington, Middlesex, on 12 December 1951, aged 73.

== Selected songs ==
1910–1919

- "Sing, Sing, Sing" (1910), Damerell and Cecil Rutland (words & music)
- "Left, Left" (1915), Damerell & John Neat (words & music)

1920s

- "Puck-a-Pu (a Chinese vocal one-step) (1920), Stanley J. Damerell, Robert Joseph Hargreaves, John Neat (words & music)
- "The Unknown Warrior" (1920), Damerell, Hargreaves, John Neat (words & music)
- "Beautiful Garden of Allah" (1921), Hargreaves & Damerell (words & music)
- "What Did the Poor Little Moths Live On, When Adam and Eve Were Here?" (1921), Hargreaves & Damerell (words & music) OCLC 497273186
- "It's Nothing to Do With You" (1921), Hargreaves & Damerell (words & music)
- "Plucky Old Ginger Nut" (1921), Hargreaves & Damerell (words & music); in A
- "Mecca" (vocal fox-trot, on the song, "My Heaven") (1921), Hargreaves, Damerell, Lillian Ray (words & music), L. Ray (arranger); piano
- "Sunshine Across Your Pathway" (1921), Hargreaves & Damerell (words), Lilian Ray (music); in G
- "The Young Folks and the Old Folks" (1921), Hargreaves & Damerell (words), Lilian Ray (music); in D
- "Take the Quiet Pathway Leading Home" (1921), Hargreaves & Damerell (words), Lilian Ray (music); in D
- "I Told Yer!" (1922), Hargreaves & Damerell (words & music)
- "Always Leave Them Smiling When You Say Good-Bye" (1922), Damerell & Hargreaves "and the two Bobs [of England]" (words & music); [staff and tonic sol-fa notations]
- "Un-Pa-Deedle-Um" (1922), Damerell & Hargreaves "and the two Bobs [of England]" (words & music); [staff and tonic sol-fa notations]
- "Au Revoir, Bon Soir, Ma Sherie" (1922), Damerell & Hargreaves "and the two Bobs [of England]" (words & music); [staff and tonic sol-fa notations]
- "Alabam and Tennessee" (1922), Damerell & Hargreaves "and the two Bobs [of England]" (words & music); in G [staff and tonic sol-fa notations]
- "The Horshoe on the Cabin Door" (1922), Damerell & Hargreaves "and John Neat [of England]" (words & music); in B♭; [staff and tonic sol-fa notations]
- "Marry in Blue" (1922), Hargreaves & Damerell (words & music); [staff and tonic sol-fa notations]
- "'Ard Up, But 'Appy" (song one-step) (1923), Hargreaves & Damerell (words), Evans (music)
- "Goldfish" (1923), Hargreaves & Damerell (words & music); in B♭; [staff and tonic sol-fa notations]
- "What's the Matter With the Dear Old Strand, That We Have No Bananas Today?" (1923), Hargreaves & Damerell (words & music); [staff and tonic sol-fa notations]
- "Heart Strings" (ballad fox-trot) (1923), Hargreaves & Damerell (words), Lillian Ray (music)
- "For Ev'ry Light That's Shining Somewhere a Broken Heart" (1923), Hargreaves & Damerell (words & music)
- "Where Was Virginia Creeping To?" (1923), Hargreaves & Damerell (words & music); in G [staff and tonic sol-fa notations]
- "I'm Afraid" (fox-trot) (1923), Hargreaves & Damerell (words & music), Lillian Ray (music)
- "Karroo" (1923), Hargreaves & Damerell (words & music), Edgar Adeler (music); [staff and tonic sol-fa notations]
- "Snuggling" (waltz song) (1923), Hargreaves & Damerell (words); Tolchard Evans (music); [staff and tonic sol-fa notations]
- "Kisses Grow on Cherry Trees," from Frivolities (1923), Hargreaves & Damerell (words), Eric Valentine & Norton Greenop (Note: Norton Greenop (né Samuel Norton Greenop; 1869–1930) was a British composer and banjoist who patented his own brand of banjos that were manufactured by J. E. Dallas & Sons, Ltd., of London.) (music)
- "Give Over" (1923), Hargreaves & Damerell (words & music); in E♭
- "Where the River Savannah is Flowing" (1923), Hargreaves & Damerell (words & music); [staff and tonic sol-fa notations]
- "Some Girl" (fox-trot) (1924), Hargreaves & Damerell (words & music)
- "They've Both Got Big Noses, So They Have to Kiss Sideways" (comedy fox-trot song) (1924), Damerell, Hargreaves, and Eric Valentine (words & music)
- "Whoops! It's Making Me Dizzy" (1924), Hargreaves (words), Damerell (words & music)
- "Dandelions and Daffodils" (1924), Damerell, Hargreaves, and George Bass (words & music)
- "Riley's Cow Shed" (fox-trot) (1924), Damerell & Hargreaves (words & music)
- "Wee, Oo-La-La, Siv-Vu-Play" (fox-trott) (1924), Damerell & Hargreaves (words & music)
- "When the Black Sheep Comes Home" (1924), Damerell, Hargreaves, and Fred Barnes (words & music)
- "Ow'd Bob" (1924), Hargreaves & Damerell (words & music); in B♭ [staff and tonic sol-fa notations]
- "Jerry, the Troublesome Tyke" (1925), Hargreaves & Damerell (words), Hargreaves (music); pf. accompaniment, with arrangement for banjulele banjo and ukulele Kel Keech; in C [staff and tonic sol-fa notations]
- "Turn O' the Tide" (waltz) (1925), Hargreaves & Damerell (words), Cor Brighton (music)
- "I've Never Wronged an Onion" ["Why Should It Make Me Cry?"] (fox-trot) (1925), Hargreaves & Damerell (words), Hargreaves (music); pf. and ukulele accompaniment; in E♭ [staff and tonic sol-fa notations]
- "Father Sings the Same Old Song Ev'ry Time We Have a Little Party" (1926), Hargreaves, Damerell, Tilsley (words & music); arr. for banjo & ukulele by Kel Keech
- "Alice, Oh, Where Are You Now?" (1926), Hargreaves & Damerell (words), Hargreaves (music), banjo & ukulele arr. Kel Keech.
- "Golden Orange Trees of California" (1927), Hargreaves & Damerell, Eddie Griffiths (words & music)
- "Tinker, Tailor, Soldier, Sailer" ("All Waiting at the Old Barn Door") (1927), Damerell & Hargreaves (words & music); banjo & ukulele arrangement by Alvin D. Keech (Note: Banjoist and arranger, Alvin Danglada Keech (1890–1948), was a brother of Kelvin Keech (1895–1977), actor, producer, and radio announcer.) OCLC 499142510 (all editions)
- "Send Yourself a Postcard Just to Say 'Cheer Up'" (1927), Hargreaves & Damerell (words & music)
- "Nobody's Sweetie" (1927), Hargreaves & Damerell (words) Hargreaves (music); pf. and ukulele acc.; in E♭ [staff and tonic sol-fa notations]
- "We Don't Know if It's Thursday Night, or if It's Piccadilly" (1927), Hargreaves & Damerell (words & music); pf. and ukulele acc.: in G [staff and tonic sol-fa notations]
- "Say It Again" (1927), Damerell, Hargreaves, Eddie Griffiths (words & music); pf. acc, with banjulele banjo and ukulele arr. by Alvin D. Keech; in F [staff and tonic sol-fa notations]
- "On the Strict Q.T., Whad'Ya Think About That Girl" (fox-trot) (1927), Damerell, Hargreaves, Eddie Griffiths (words & music); pf. and ukulele acc.; in F [staff and tonic sol-fa notations]
- "Rock Me in the Cradle of the Deep" (fox-trot) (1927), Damerell, Hargreaves, Eddie Griffiths (words & music); pf. acc, with banjulele banjo and ukulele arr. by Alvin D. Keech; in G [staff and tonic sol-fa notations]
- "I Loved No One but My Mother Till the Day That I Met You" (1927), Damerell & Hargreaves (words & music); banjo & ukulele arrangement by Alvin D. Keech
- "Casabianca" (6/8 comedy one-step) (1928), Damerell & Hargreaves (words), Evans (music); pf. and ukulele acc. [staff and tonic sol-fa notations]
- "Ammoniated Tincture of Quinine" (fox-trot) (1928), Damerell & Hargreaves (words), Evans (music); pf. and ukulele accompaniment; in E♭ [staff and tonic sol-fa notations]
- "The Angelus Was Ringing As We Sang Loves Old Sweet Song" (1928), Damerell & Hargreaves (words & music); pf. and ukulele & banjulele banjo accompaniment [staff and tonic sol-fa notations]
- "Miss Molly O'Moore" (waltz) (1928), Erell Reaves (words), Evans (music); pf. and ukulele acc. [staff and tonic sol-fa notations]
- "The Angelus Was Ringing" (revision) (1928), Damerell & Hargreaves (words & music); pf. accompaniment with banjo & ukulele arrangement
- "I Wish She'd Come Along Now" (1928), Bennett Scott, Damerell, Hargreaves (words & music); pf. and ukulele & banjulele banjo accompaniment [staff and tonic sol-fa notations]
- "By the Windmill" (fox-trot) (1928), Hargreaves & Damerell (words & music); pf accompaniment with banjulele banjo & ukulele arrangement
- "Tho' Castles Tumble Down," theme song to Master and Man (1929) Hargreaves, Damerell, Pat Heale (words), Tilsley & Evans (music); pf. and ukulele acc. [staff and tonic sol-fa notations]
- "Marvellous, Magical Moon" (slow melody fox-trot) (1929), Hargreaves & Damerell (words), Evans (music); pf. and ukulele acc. [staff and tonic sol-fa notations]
- "Yellow Corn," theme song to Cupid in Clover (1929), Hargreaves, Damerell, Pat Heale (words), Tilsley & Evans (music); pf. and ukulele acc. [staff and tonic sol-fa notations]
- "Mademoiselle Pomme-De-Terre" (comedy one step) (1929), Hargreaves & Damerell (words), Evans (music); pf. and ukulele acc. [staff and tonic sol-fa notations]
- "Yes! Yes! Yes! I Certainly Will" (song fox-trot) (1929), Damerell & Hargreaves (words), Evans (music); pf. and ukulele acc. [staff and tonic sol-fa notations]
- "Heather Moon" (valse) (1929), Damerell & Hargreaves (words), Evans (music); pf. and ukulele acc. [staff and tonic sol-fa notations]
- "Monte Carlo" (continental comedy one-step) (1929) Hargreaves & Damerell (words), Evans (music); pf. and ukulele acc. [staff and tonic sol-fa notations]
- "Silver River" (fox-trot) (1929) Hargreaves & Damerell (words), Sherman Myers (music); pf. and ukulele acc. [staff and tonic sol-fa notations]
- "He Loved Her, Who Did? He Did, Where?" (1929), Hargreaves, Damerell, Tilsley (words & music); pf. and ukulele acc. [staff and tonic sol-fa notations]
- "When I Met Connie in the Cornfield" (comedy song fox-trot) (1929) Tilsley, Hargreaves, Damerell (words & music); pf. and ukulele acc. [staff and tonic sol-fa notations]
- "Chinese Twilight" (1929), Hargreaves & Damerell (words), Sherman Myers (music); pf. and ukulele acc. [staff and tonic sol-fa notations]
- "When the Light Shines Brightly in the Lighthouse" (comedy song fox-trot) (1929) Hargreaves & Damerell (words & music); pf. and ukulele acc. [staff and tonic sol-fa notations]
- "I'm in Love With Sheila O’Shay" (1929), Hargreaves & Damerell (words & music), Eddie Griffiths (musis); banjo & ukulele arrangement by Alvin D. Keech
- "There's a Lovely Lake in Loveland" (1929), Ralph Butler & Damerell (words), Evans (music)
- "Cigarette" (continentall fox-trot) (1929), Hargreaves & Damerell (words), Evans (music)
- "Moscow" (comedy, six-eight-ski) (1929), Damerell & Hargreaves (words), adapted by Evans from famous Russian airs; pf. and ukulele acc. [staff and tonic sol-fa notations]
- "Maggie's Cold" (comedy fox-trot) (1929), written & composed by Harry Tilsley, Hargreaves, and Damerell; pf. and ukulele acc. [staff and tonic sol-fa notations]
- "Giggling Golliwog" (1929), Erell Reaves (story), Tilsley & Evans (music)
- "Keep on Repeating It" (song fox-trot) (1929), Erell Reaves and H. B. Tilsley (words), Marcelle Mayne (music); pf. and ukulele acc. [staff and tonic sol-fa notations]
- "Love Means Nothing to You" (song fox-trot) (1929) Butler & Erell Reaves (lyrics), Tilsley (music); pf. and ukulele acc. [staff and tonic sol-fa notations]
- "Forget-Me-Not" (waltz ballad) (1929) Erell Reaves (words), Phyllis Mayhead (music); pf. and ukulele acc. [staff and tonic sol-fa notations]
- "Fairy on the Clock" (novelty fox-trot) (1929), Erell Reaves (words), Myers (music)
- "If I'm Kind to Mary" (fox-trot) (1929) Erell Reaves, Howard Flynn, Ralph Butler (words & music); pf. and ukulele acc. [staff and tonic sol-fa notations]
- "That's All" (waltz) (1929), Hargreaves & Damerell (words), Tilsley (music); pf. and ukulele ace. [staff and tonic sol-fa notations]

1930s

- "I Took Jane, Walking in the Rain" (1930), Hargreaves, Damerell, Tilsley (1930); pf. and ukulele ace. [staff and tonic sol-fa notations]
- "Japanese Fan" (oriental fox-trot) (1930), Robert Stanley (words), Tilsley (music); with ukulele arr. [staff and tonic sol-fa notations]
- "You Die if You Worry" (1930), Hargreaves & Damerell (words & music)
- "Standing in the Sitting Room" (1930); Hargreaves, Damerell, Tilsley (words & music); pf. and ukulele acc. [staff and tonic sol-fa notations]
- "Vamp of Baghdad" (comedy oriental fox-trot) (1930), Hargreaves & Damerell (words), Evans (music); pf. and ukulele acc. [staff and tonic sol-fa notations]
- "Will Anybody Here Have a Drink? Yes, I Will" (fox-trot) (1930), Hargreaves, Damerell, Evans (words & music); pf . and ukulele acc. [staff and tonic sol-fa notations]
- "Airman, Airman! Don't Put the Wind Up Me!" (fox-trot) (1930), Hargreaves, Damerell, and Tilsley (words & music); pf. and ukulele ace. [staff and tonic sol-fa notations]
- "A Little Old Cottage" (fox-trot) (1930), Hargreaves & Damerell (words), Ray Benson (music); pf. and ukulele ace. [staff and tonic sol-fa notations]
- "The Shadow on the Blind" (fox-trot) (1930), Hargreaves & Damerell (words), Evans (music); pf. and ukulele ace. [staff and tonic sol-fa notations]
- "There's Hundreds, Thousands – Millions of Them Now!" (fox-trot) (1930), Hargreaves & Damerell (words), Tilsley (music); pf. and ukulele ace. [staff and tonic sol-fa notations]
- "Bandy Bertha's Birthday" (comedy fox-trot) (1930), Hargreaves, Damerell, Tilsley (words & music); pf. and ukulele ace. [staff and tonic sol-fa notations]
- "Fire! Fire! Fire!" (comedy fox-trot) (1930), Hargreaves, Damerell. Tilsley (words & music); pf. and ukulele ace. [staff and tonic sol-fa notations]
- "Sam Sat With Sophie on the Sofa" (comedy fox-trot) (1930), Hargreaves, Damerell, Tilsley (words & music); pf. and ukulele ace. [staff and tonic sol-fa notations]
- "The Tapper" (1930), Hargreaves & Damerell (words), Evans (music); pf. and ukulele ace. [staff and tonic sol-fa notations]
- "Cupid on the Cake" (novelty fox-trot) (1930), Erell Reaves (words), Myers (music); with ukulele arr. [staff and tonic sol-fa notations]
- "Soldier on the Shelf" (toyshop fable, fox-trot) Erell Reaves (words), Myers (music); with ukulele arr. [staff and tonic sol-fa notations]
- "I Took Jane, Walking in the Rain" (1930), Hargreaves, Damerell, Tilsley (words & music); pf . and ukulele ace. [staff and tonic sol-fa notations]
- "Hunting Tigers Out in Indiah" (fox-trot) (1930), Hargreaves & Damerell (words), Evans (music); with ukulele arrangement [staff and tonic sol-fa notations]
- "Let's Have a Sing Song" (six eight one-step) (1930), Hargreaves & Damerell (words), Evans (music); with ukulele arrangement [staff and tonic sol-fa notations]
- "Persian Slave" (oriental fox-trot) (1930), Hargreaves & Damerell (words), Sherman Myers (pseudonym of Montague Ewing) (music); with ukulele arrangement [staff and tonic sol-fa notations]
- "Send Out Sunshine" (fox-trot) (1930), Hargreaves & Damerell (words), Evans (music); with ukulele arrangement [staff and tonic sol-fa notations]
- "Does a Choo-Choo Go Puff-Puff, or a Puff-Puff Go Choo-Choo" (fox-trot) (1930), Hargreaves & Damerell (words), Tilsley (music); with ukulele arr. [staff and tonic sol-fa notations]
- "If I Hadn't Been a Wanderer" (fox-trot) (1930), Hargreaves & Damerell (words), Tilsley (music); with ukulele arr. [staff and tonic sol-fa notations]
- "Pass! Shoot! Goal!" (fox-trot) (1930), Hargreaves, Damerell, Tilsley (words & music); with ukulele arr. [staff and tonic sol-fa notations]
- "Sittin' on a Five Barred Gate" (1931), Hargreaves & Damerell (words), Hargreaves (music); with ukulele arr. [staff and tonic sol-fa notations]
- "Slippery Sam the Stoker" (fox-trot) (1930), Hargreaves, Damerell, Tilsley (words & music); with ukulele arr. [staff and tonic sol-fa notations]
- "Dance of the Rain-Drops" (fox-trot fantasy) (1930), Erell Reaves (words), Evans (music)
- "Syncopated Melody" (1930), Erell Reaves (words), Evans (music); pf. and ukulele acc. [staff and tonic sol-fa notations]
- "The Watermill" (characteristic fox-trot) (1930), Erell Reaves (words), Evans (music); pf. and ukulele acc. [staff and tonic sol-fa notations]
- "Wax-Works" (fox-trot) (1930), Erell Reaves (words), Evans (music); with ukulele arr. [staff and tonic sol-fa notations]
- "Does a Choo-Choo Go Puff-Puff" (fox-trot) (1930), Hargreaves, Damerell, Tilsley (words & music); with ukulele arr. [staff and tonic sol-fa notations]
- "If I Hadn't Been a Wanderer" (fox-trot) (1930), Hargreaves & Damerell (words), Tilsley (music); with ukulele arr. [staff and tonic sol-fa notations]
- "Slippery Sam the Stoker" (fox-trot) (1930), Hargreaves, Damerell, Tilsley (words & music); with ukulele arr. [staff and tonic sol-fa notations]
- "If I Had My Time Over Again" (waltz) (1931), Tilsley, Evans, Robert Stanley; with ukulele arr. [staff and tonic sol-fa notations]
- "Keep Walking" (1931), Hargreaves, Damerell, Tilsley (words & music); with ukulele arr. [staff and tonic sol-fa notations]
- "The Landlady's Daughter" (1931), Tilsley (words & music); with ukulele arr. [staff and tonic sol-fa notations]
- "Woof! Yap! Bow-Wow-Wow; The Casey Court Dog Race" (1931), Hargreaves, Damerell, Tilsley (words & music); with ukulele arr. [staff and tonic sol-fa notations]
- "Tell Me a Tale of Old Virginia" (1931), Tilsley (words), Evans (music); with ukulele arr. [staff and tonic sol-fa notations]
- "That's Somerset" (waltz) (1931), Tilsley (words), Evans (music); with ukulele arr. [staff and tonic sol-fa notations]
- "Toodle-oo! I Gotta Go Home" (1931), Hargreaves, Damerell, Evans (words & music); with ukulele arr. [staff and tonic sol-fa notations]
- "Up Aroun' the Ole North Pole" (1931), Hargreaves & Damerell (words), Hargreaves (music); with ukulele arr. [staff and tonic sol-fa notations]
- "When You've Got the Pip, Shout Hip, Pip, Hooray" (1931), Hargreaves & Damerell (words), Evans (music); with ukulele arr. [staff and tonic sol-fa notations]
- "Cuckoo in the Clock" (1931), Ralph Freed & Erell Reaves (words), Sherman Myers & Charley Kisco
- "Lizzie! Come in and shut that door" (1931), Hargreaves & Damerell (words), Hargreaves (music); with ukulele arr. [staff and tonic sol-fa notations]
- "Tally-Ho for Jockey Joe, on Bess From the Boneyard" (1931), Hargreaves & Damerell (words), Hargreaves (music); with ukulele arr. [staff and tonic sol-fa notations]
- "Going! Going! Gone" (fox-trot) (1931), Hargreaves & Damerell (words), Tilsley (music); with ukelele arr. [staff and tonic sol-fa notations]
- "Morocco" (1931), Hargreaves & Damerell (words), Evans (music); with ukulele arr. [staff and tonic sol-fa notations]
- "Who Was It Makin’ Hay, Round Behind the Hay-Stack, Eh" (1931), Hargreaves & Damerell (words), Hargreaves (music); with ukulele arr. [staff and tonic sol-fa notations]
- "When I Met Sally at the Seaside" (fox-trot) (1931), Hargreaves & Damerell (words), Tilsley & Evans (music); with ukulele arr. [staff and tonic sol-fa notations]
- "Soon" (1931), Hargreaves & Damerell (words), Evans & Sherman Myers (music); with ukulele arr. [staff and tonic sol-fa notations]
- "They All Make Love But Me" (comedy song fox-trot) (1931), Hargreaves & Damerell (words), Hargreaves (music); with ukulele arr. [staff and tonic sol-fa notations]
- "Dance of the Navvies" (comedy characteristic fox-trot) (1931), Hargreaves & Damerell (words), Evans Sherman Myers (music); with ukulele arr. [staff and tonic sol-fa notations]
- "Let's All Sing Like One O'Clock" (vocal 6/8 one-step) (1931), Hargreaves & Damerell (words), Evans (music); with ukulele arr. [staff and tonic sol-fa notations]
- "Old Man Sea" (fox-trot) (1931), Hargreaves & Damerell (words), Tilsley (music); with ukulele arr.
- "On a Cold and Frosty Morning" (1931), Hargreaves & Damerell (words), Hargreaves (music); with ukulele arr. [staff and tonic sol-fa notations]
- "Life's Desire" ("My Life's Desire") (1931), Hargreaves & Damerell (words), Evans (music); with ukulele arrangement [staff and tonic sol-fa notations] → popularized by Gracie Fields
- "Lady of Spain" (1931), Evans, Damerell, Hargreaves
- "Let's Have a Darn Good Moan" (1932), Hargreaves, Damerell, Tilsley (words & music); with ukulele arr.
- "Our John Willie's Farm" (1932), Hargreaves, Damerell, Tilsley (words & music); with ukulele arr.
- "I've Stood in This Market Place" (fox-trot) (1932), Hargreaves & Damerell (words), Tilsley (music); with ukulele arr.
- "Majah General Thing-A-Me-Bob" (1932), Evans (music), Damerell & Hargreaves (words)
- "Why Be So Unkind to Me?" (1932), Evans, Harry Tilsley, Robert Stanley (pseudonym of Stanley Damerell) & Hargreaves (words & music)
- "Good Evening" (1932), Evans (music), Damerell & Hargreaves (words)
- "I’ve Got to Keep In With Her Father" (1932), Hargreaves & Damerell (words), Tilsley (music); with ukulele arr. [staff and tonic sol-fa notations]
- "Our Cat – And the Cat Next Door" (1932), Hargreaves & Damerell (words), Tilsley (music); with ukulele arr.
- "We All Wanna Know Why" (1932), Hargreaves, Damerell, Tilsley (words & music); with ukulele arr.
- "When Matilda's Flirting Around (1932), Hargreaves & Damerell (words), Tilsley (music); with ukulele arr.
- "Let's All Sing Like the Birdies Sing" (1932), Damerell & Hargreaves (words), Evans (music)
- "Butterflies in the Rain (1932), Damerell, Hargreaves, Myers (words & music)
- "Our Maggie's Gone and Caught Another Cold" (1933), Hargreaves & Damerell (words), Tilsley (music); with ukelele arr.
- "Bom-Ba-Diddy-Bom-Bom" (1933), Tisley & Robert Stanley (words), Evans (music); with ukelele arr.
- "At Mary Ellen's Hot Pot Party" (1933), Hargreaves & Damerell (words), Tilsley (music); with ukelele arr.
- "Our Maggie's Gone and Caught Another Cold" (1933), Hargreaves & Damerell (words), Tilsley (music); with ukelele arr.
- "Waiters on Parade" (1933), Hargreaves, Damerell, Tilsley (words), Montague Ewing (music); with ukelele arr.
- "Eleven Good Lads; Football Anthem" (1933), Hargreaves, Damerell, Tilsley (words & music)
- "Gug-Gug-Gug-Gertie, I Lul-Lul-Lul Love You" (1933), Hargreaves, Damerell, Tilsley (words & music); with ukelele arr.
- "It Was Four O'Clock in the Morning (1933), Hargreaves, Damerell, Tilsley (words & music)
- "My Mother's Favourite Song (waltz) (1933), Hargreaves & Damerell (words), Tilsley (music)
- "Da-Dar, Da-Dee" (1933), Damerell & Hargreaves (words), Evans (music)
- "You Need an Umbrella Now and Again" (fox-trot) (1934), Hargreaves & Damerell (words), Hargreaves (music)
- "Seeing It Thro' Together" (1934), Hargreaves & Damerell (words), Hargreaves (music); with ukulele arrangement
- "Wait for the Kettle to Boil" (1934), Hargreaves & Damerell (words), Evans (music)
- "The Lollypop Major" (fantasy in fox-trot rhythm) (1934), Damerell (words), Montague Ewing (1890–1957) (music)
- "Pedro, the Nut From Brazil" (6/8 quickstep) (1934), Hargreaves & Damerell (words), Evans (music); with ukulele arrangement
- "The Tower of London" (1934), Damerell (words), Montague Ewing, Evans (words & music)
- "Dear! Dear! Dear! Tut! Tut! Tut! Well! Well! Well!" (fox-trot) (1934), Hargreaves & Damerell (words), Evans (music)
- "Old Monastery Bell" (waltz) (1934), Hargreaves & Damerell (words), Evans (music)
- "I Bought Myself a Bottle of Ink" (song fox-trot) (1934), Arthur Le Clerq & Damerell (words), Evans (music); with ukulele arrangement
- "Go to Sleep" (slow fox-trot) (1934), Hargreaves & Damerell (words), Evans (music)
- "Dearest" (fox-trot) (1934), Damerell (words), Evans (music)
- "One of the Crowd" (fox-trot) (1934), Hargreaves & Damerell (words), Louis Rey (music); with ukulele arrangement
- "'Sno Use Sitting on a Sofa" (comedy cho. fox-trot) (1934), Hargreaves & Damerell (words), Evans (music)
- "Two Can't Sit on a Three-Piece Suite" (fox-trot) (1934), Hargreaves & Damerell (words), Evans (music)
- "Homeward" (1934), Hargreaves & Damerell (words), Evans (music)
- "If (They Made Me a King)" (1934), Evans, Damerell, Hargreaves
- "Unless" (waltz, ballad) (1934), Evans (music), Hargreaves & Damerell (words)
- "If" ("If I Hadn't the Right to You") (song waltz) (1934), Hargreaves & Damerell (words), Evans (music)
- "Argentina" (paso doble) (1934), Damerell (words), Evans (music); with ukulele arrangement
- "Sleeping on the Floor" (fox-trot) (1934), Damerell & Hargreaves (words), Reginald Tabbush (music); with ukulele arrangement
- "When I Met My Girl in the Rain" (fox-trot) (1934), Damerell (words), Evans (music)
- "The Cow" (1934), Damerell (words), Sherman Myers (music); with ukulele arrangement
- "My Antoinette" (6/8 quickstep) (1935), Damerell (words), Evans (music); with symbols for pf accordion and guitar
- "Moonlight on the Nile" (6/8 quickstep) (1935), Damerell (words), Myers (music); with symbols for pf accordion and guitar
- "Song of the Trees" (fox-trot) (1935), Evans (music), Damerell (words); with symbols for pf accordion and guitar
- "Whistling Lovers' Waltz" (1935), Evans (music), Damerell (words); with ukulele arrangement
- "Funny Little Feller" (1935), Evans (music), Damerell (words); with ukulele arrangement
- "Just a Kiss" (waltz) (1935), founded on themes from Zampa and Raymond Overtures; Damerell (words), music adopted by Evans; with symbols for guitar and pf accordion
- "Happy Hunting Ground" (fox-trot) (1935), Damerell, Evans, Myers (words & music)
- "Lady, Sing Your Gypsy Song" (fox-trot) (1935), Damerell (words), Myers (music)
- "The Paper Hat Brigade" (fox-trot) (1935), Damerell (words), Myers (music)
- "Dancing in a Dream" (fox-trot) (1935), Damerell (words), Evans (music)
- "In a Little Dutch Town" (characteristic fox-trot) (1935), Damerell (words), Myers (music)
- "Just a Pair in a Chair, 'Neath the Old Oak Tree" (1935), Damerell (words), Benny Thornton (music); with arrangement for guitar and pf accordion
- "Said the Crochet to the Quaver" (fox-trot) (1935), Damerell (words), Myers (music); with arrangement for pf accordion and guitar
- "On Venetian Waters" (fox-trot) (1935), Damerell (words), Myers (music)
- "Sing Me a Song of Home Sweet Home" (fox-trot) (1935), Butler & Damerell (words), Evans (music)
- "There's a Lovely Lake in London" (1935), Butler & Damerell (words), Evans (music)
- "Lady of Madrid" ("Madrileña") (1935), Hargreaves & Damerell (words), Evans (music); with guitar arrangement
- "Down Devonshire Way" (waltz) (1935), Damerell (words), Evans (music)
- "When You Grow Up, Little Lady" (fox-trot) (1935), Butler & Damerell (words), Evans (music)
- "Listen in Your Radio" (1937), Evans (music), Damerell (words) → Signature tune for Radiolympia, introduced in 1937, sung by Paula Green (1917–2012), a British dance band singer
- "We Can't Make Love Like the Old Folks Used To Do" (fox-trot) (1935), Butler & Damerell (words), Evans (music)
- "Simple Simon" (fox-trot story) (1935), Butler & Damerell (words), Myers (music)
- "We Wanna Goal" (1935), Butler & Damerell (words), Evans (music)
- "After All These Years" (fox-trot) (1935), Butler & Damerell (words), Evans (music)
- "The Duck Song; Quack, Quack, Quack" (waltz) (1935), Butler & Damerell (words), Evans (music)
- "The Army Fell for Little Isabel" (1935), Butler & Stan Merrell (words), Evan Chard (music)
- "Carry On, London" (fox-trot) (1935), Butler & Damerell (words), Myers (music)
- "He Kissed Maggie – Maggie Kissed Him Back" (fox-trot) (1935), Butler & Damerell (words), Evans (music)
- "On the Prom-Prom-Promenade" (comedy song) (1935), Butler & Damerell (words), Evans (music)
- "Sweet Louise" (fox-trot) (1935), Butler & Damerell (words), Evans (music)
- "Just a Corner in Paradise" (tango-fox-trot) (1935), Butler & Damerell (words), Myers (music)
- "Rhythm of the Sea" (fox-trot) (1936), Butler & Damerell (words), Evans (music)
- " Little Boy Sailor" (characteristic song fox-trot) (1936), Damerell (words), Myers (music)
- "I'm Sitting Round the Old Round Table" (fox-trot) (1936), Butler & Damerell (words), Evans (music)
- "A Novel in a Nutshell" (fox-trot) (1936), Butler & Damerell (words), Evans (music)
- "She's Got That Little Something" (fox-trot) (1936), Butler & Damerell (words), Evans (music)
- "Song of the Lift" (fox-trot) (1936), Butler & Damerell (words), Evans (music)
- "Symphony" (waltz) (1936), Butler & Damerell (words), Evans (music)
- "Kentucky" (fox-trot) (1936), Butler & Damerell (words), Myers (music)
- "Supposing" (fox-trot) (1936), Butler & Damerell (words), Evans (music)
- "Although" (waltz) (1936), Butler & Damerell (words), Evans (music)
- "White Cliffs" (fox-trot) (1936), Butler & Damerell (words), Evans (music)
- "Where Yorkshire and Lancashire Meet" (waltz song) (1936), Butler & Damerell (words), Evans (music)
- "Oh! Soldier! Who's Your Lady Love?" (6/8 comedy song) (1936), Butler & Damerell (words), Evans (music)
- "Three Minutes of Heaven" (3 figure waltz) (1936), Butler & Damerell (words), Evans (music)
- "Have You Heard the Rumour?" (fox-trot) (1936), Butler & Damerell (words), Evans (music)
- "In a Gypsy Caravan" (1936), Butler & Damerell (words), Myers (music)
- "A Little Ring of Gold" (fox-trot) (1936), Jack Stevens (words), Evans (music)
- "When the Swallows Next Again" (fox-trot) (1936), Jack Stevens (words), Sydney Edmund [Evans] (music)
- "She Couldn't Say 'Boo' to a Goose" (1936), Butler & Damerell (words), Evans (music)
- "The Memory of a Tiny Shoe" (fox-trot) (1936), Damerell (words), Evans (music); with arrangement for ukulele, etc. → popularized by Phyllis Robins, vocalist, accompanied by Fred Hartley and His Orchestra
- "Empty Armchair" (1937), Damerell & Evans (words & music), Howard Ross (piano score)
- "Whistling Gypsy (waltz from Command Performance) (1937), Damerell (words), Evans (music)
- "Can You Be More Than Just a Friend?" (1937), Damerell (words), Evans (music)
- "A Little Chap With Big Ideas" (fox-trot) (1937), Ron Drake & Damerell (words), Evans (music); with arrangement for ukulele, etc.
- "Dickery Dock, Tale of the Talking Clock" (fox-trot intermezzo) (1937), Damerell (words), Evans (music)
- "Lover's Land Is Up Again" (fox-trot) (1937), Damerell & Butler (words), Evans (music)
- "Dance! Gypsy Dance" (fox-trot from Command Performance) (1937), Damerell (words), Evans (music)
- "Whispering Waltz" (waltz) (1938), Damerell (words), Evans (music)
- "Keep It in the Family Circle" (1938), Damerell & Hargreaves (words), Evans & Tilsley (music)
- "Photograph of Mother's Wedding Group" (1938), Damerell & Hargreaves (words), Evans (music)
- "Down a Little Alley" (fox-trot) (1937), Damerell (words), Evans (music); with ukulele arrangement and chord figures for pf. accordion, banjo and guitar
- "Just an Old Umbrella" (fox-trot) (1937), Damerell (words), Evans (music); with ukulele arrangement and chord figures for pf. accordion, banjo and guitar
- "Fishermaid of Old St. Malo" (fox-trot) (1937), Damerell, Sherman Myers (pseudonym of Montague Ewing) (music); with arr. for ukulele, etc.
- "Piccaninnies, Climb Dem Stairs" (fox-trot) (1937), Damerell (words), Evans (music); with arrangement for ukulele, etc.
- "Vagabond Fiddler (Gypsy idyll) (1937), Damerell (words), Sherman Myers (music); with ukulele arrangement and chord figures for pf. accordion, banjo and guitar
- "Le Touquet" (comedy paso-doble) (1937), Damerell & Edward Clifton (words), Evans (music); with arrangement for ukulele, etc.
- "Lily of the Valley" (fox-trot) (1937), Damerell (words), Evans (music); with arrangement for ukulele, etc.
- "Swing Serenade" (fox-trot) (1937), Edward Clifton & Damerell (words), Evans (music); with arrangement for ukulele, etc.
- "Romany Love Song" (fox-trot) (1937), Damerell (words), Evans (music); with arrangement for ukulele, etc.
- "Roaming in the Moonlight" (1937), Butler & Damerell (words), Evans (music); with arrangement for ukulele, etc.
- "Day In – Day Out" (fox-trot) (1937), Damerell & Butler (words), Evans (music)
- "For You" (fox-trot) (1937), Damerell & Butler (words), Evans (music)
- "Humming Waltz" (1938), Damerell (words), Evans (music)
- "Love's Old Sweet Melody" (fox-trot) (1938), Damerell (words), Evans (music)
- "Until We Meet Again" (waltz, ballad) (1939), Damerell (words), Evans (music)
- "I Take Off My Hat to the Man in the Moon" (fox-trot) (1939), Butler & Damerell (words), Evans (music)
- "My Garden of Memory" (fox-trot) (1939), Butler & Damerell (words), Evans (music)
- "Doopey-Doopey-Doo, It Will All Come Right in the End" (fox-trot) (1939), Butler & Damerell (words), Evans (music)

1940s

- "When You Return" (waltz) (1940), Ralph Stanley & Damerell (words), Evans (music)
- "Cuban Lady" (paso doble) (1940), Damerell (words), Evans (music)
- "Two Old Timers" (fox-trot) (1940), Butler & Damerell (words), Evans (music)
- "I Hear Your Voice" (1942), Evans (music), Damerell (words), Butler (words)
- "Sailor, Who Are You Dreaming of Tonight? (1944), Evans (music), Damerell (words), Butler (words)

1950s

- "Faith" (1952), Damerell & Floyd Huddleston (words), Evans (music)

== Song filmography ==
- Rolf är här ändå (1930 Swedish film)

"On Her Door Step Last Night" (Swedish: "I porten i går kväll")

- Flyg-Bom (English: Bom the Flyer) (1952 Swedish film)

"If"

- The Charming Deceiver (1933)

"Whistling Under the Moon"

- Command Performance (1937)

"Whistling Gypsy"

- Molly and Me (1945)

"Let's All Sing Like the Birdies Sing," performed by Gracie Fields and the house staff

- Radio Days (1987)

"Let's All Sing Like the Birdies Sing," sung by Danielle Ferland (uncredited) in a radio commercial

- Happy Feet (2006)

"Let's All Sing Like the Birdies Sing"

For the filmography of the song, "Lady of Spain," see article.

== Bibliography ==
=== References ===
- Baker, Richard Anthony (2011). Endnote 159 from Chapter 10. Old-Time Variety: An Illustrated History. p. 229 – via Internet Archive (Kahle/Austin Foundation). LCCN 2011-453853; ISBN 978-1-8446-8124-2, ISBN 978-1-8446-8126-6; OCLC 1311047990 (all editions).
- "Evans (Sydney Edmund) Tolchard". Oxford Dictionary of National Biography: In Association With the British Academy : From the Earliest Times to the Year 2000. Vol. 18. 2004. p. 757 – via Internet Archive.
- Grand Order of Water Rats. "Past King Rats, 1890–1965". www.gowr.co.uk.
- Grand Order of Lady Ratlings. "Gone But Not Forgotten". www.golr.org.uk.
- Lax, Roger; The Estate of Frederick Smith (1989). The Great Song Thesaurus (updated & expanded) (2nd ed.). Oxford University Press. ISBN 978-0-19-505408-8 – via Internet Archive. LCCN 88-31267; ISBN 0-1950-5408-3; OCLC 18588306 (all editions).
1. Lax, Roger; Smith, Frederick (1989). "Butterflies in the Rain". Oxford University Press. p. 204. ISBN 978-0-19-505408-8.
2. Lax, Roger; Smith, Frederick (1989). "Sailor, Who Are You Dreaming of Tonight?". Oxford University Press. p. 360. ISBN 978-0-19-505408-8.
3. Lax, Roger; Smith, Frederick (1989). "There's a Lovely Lake in London". Oxford University Press. p. 391. ISBN 978-0-19-505408-8.
4. Lax, Roger; Smith, Frederick (1989). "Unless". Oxford University Press. p. 404. ISBN 978-0-19-505408-8.
5. Lax, Roger; Smith, Frederick (1989). "You Die if You Worry". Oxford University Press. p. 429. ISBN 978-0-19-505408-8.
- Rehrig, William Harold (1939– ) (1996). "Ewing, Montague". In Bierley, Paul Edmund (1926–2016) (ed.). Supplement to – The Heritage Encyclopedia of Band Music: Composers and Their Music. Vol. 3 (of 3). Integrity Press. p. 257 – via Internet Archive. LCCN 91-73637; ISBN 978-0-9180-4812-7, 0-9180-4812-5 (vol 3); OCLC 45209483 (all editions).
- SecondHandSongs. "Songs Written by Stanley J. Damerell". SecondHandSongs. ISSN 0140-0460; OCLC 5466850494.
- Whitcomb, Ian Timothy (1941–1920) (2007). "My Uncle Wrote 'Lady of Spain'". The Ian Whitcomb Songbook. Mel Bay. pp. 6–11 – via Google Books (limited preview). (Whitcomb, Ian (2007). altnerate link. Mel Bay Publications, Incorporated. ISBN 978-0-7866-7634-7 – via Internet Archive → ARChive of Contemporary Music.) LCCN 2008-564273; ISBN 978-0-7866-7634-7, 0-7866-7634-5; OCLC 176947021 (all editions).
Web version: "My Uncle Wrote 'Lady of Spain'". www.picklehead.com. Website of the late Ian Whitcomb.
The author, Ian Whitcomb, by way of his mother, Eileen Whitcomb (née Eileen Mary Burningham; 1913–1998), was a grand nephew-in-law of John Edward Stanley Damerell Stevens. Put another way, he was a grand nephew of J.E.S.D. Stevens' second wife, Irene Victoria Stevens (aka Noel Damerell; aka Irenie Damerell; né Irene Victoria Burningham; 1887–1969).
- White, Mark (born 1916) (1985) [1983]. "Evans, Tolchard". 'You Must Remember This ... ' – Popular Songwriters, 1900–1980. New York: Charles Scribner's Sons. pp. 89–90. ISBN 9780684184333 – via Internet Archive (Kahle/Austin Foundation). LCCN 86-198615, LCCN 85-1974; ISBN 0-6841-8433-8, 978-0-6841-8433-3; OCLC 11755682 (all editions).
  Mark White was retired from BBC Radio when he wrote the book. In 1948, he founded and hosted the BBC Jazz Club (aka Mark White's Jazz Club), a weekly radio broadcast (OCLC 60807333) that superseded the BBC's Radio Rhythm Club. In 1970, he became head of BBC Radio 1 and, in 1972, head of Radio 2.

=== Copyrights ===
- Catalogue of Copyright Entries. Part 3 – "Musical Compositions" – New Series. Vol. 26, No. 3 (March 1931). Library of Congress, Copyright Office. 1931 – via Internet Archive.
1. "Lady of Spain" (©4 February 1931; 1 copy (unpublished) March 11, 1931; Class E (musical composition) for. 17297; Cecil Lennox, Ltd., London). Spanish quick-step or fox-trot, lyrics by Erell Reaves; music by Tolchard Evans of Great Britain; with ukulele arrangement [staff and tonic sol-fa notations]. U.S. Govt. Print. Off. 1931. p. 343 – via Internet Archive.
- Catalog of Copyright Entries. Part 3 – "Musical Compositions" – New Series. Vol. 30, No. 3 (1935). Library of Congress, Copyright Office – via Google Books (University of California Libraries).
1. "Volume Index for 1935" → "Merrell (Stan) pseud. see Damerell (Stanley)". p. 1745.
- Catalogue of Copyright Entries. "Part 3: Musical Compositions." "New Series".
1. Vol. 10. Part 1. First Half of 1915. Nos. 1–7.
2. Vol. 10. For the Year 1915. Nos. 1–13.
3. World War I: 1914–1918
4. Vol. 15. Part 1. First Half of 1920. Nos. 1–7. ‡
5. Vol. 15. Part 2. Last Half of 1920. Nos. 8–13.
6. Vol. 16. Part 1. First Half of 1921. Nos. 1–7.
7. Vol. 16. Part 2. Last Half of 1921. Nos. 7–12.
8. Vol. 16. Part 2. Last Half of 1921. Nos. 7–13 (includes Index).
9. Vol. 16. 1921. No. 13 (includes Index).
10. Vol. 17. Part 1. First Half of 1922. Nos. 1–6.
11. Vol. 17. Part 2. Last Half of 1922. Nos. 8–13. U.S. Govt. Print. Off. 1922.
12. Vol. 18. Part 1. First Half of 1923. Nos. 1–7. U.S. Govt. Print. Off. 1923.
13. Vol. 18. Part 2. Last Half of 1923. Nos. 8–13.
14. Vol. 19. May & June 1924. Nos. 5–6.
15. Vol. 19. For the Year 1924. Nos. 1–12. U.S. Govt. Print. Off. 1924.
16. Vol. 20. For the Year 1925. Nos. 1–12.
17. Vol. 21. For the Year 1926. Nos. 1–12. U.S. Govt. Print. Off. 1926.
18. Vol. 36. Part 2; Last Half of 1941. Nos. 5–12.
- Catalog of Copyright Entries (1927 to 1949 – online) – via U Penn.
