= Lady of Spain =

1931 popular song

"Lady of Spain" is a popular song composed in 1931, with music by Tolchard Evans, and lyrics by Erell Reaves and Henry Tilsley.

"Erell Reaves" is a pseudonym of the duo Stanley J. Damerell and Robert Hargreaves (1894–1934),

The sheet music was published in London by the Peter Maurice Music Company and in New York by the Sam Fox Publishing Company.

== Performance ==
The earliest recordings of this song were sung by Al Bowlly and Tino Folgar, recorded in 1931 (the year the song was written). Bowlly made recordings with both Ray Noble's and Roy Fox's orchestras. In 1949, Noble's 1931 recording was reissued, with Bowlly's original vocal replaced by a dubbed-in vocal trio, and the record reached No. 19 in the Billboard charts. Bowlly had died in the intervening period.

A recording by Eddie Fisher with Hugo Winterhalter and his orchestra was made at Manhattan Center, New York City, on July 18, 1952. It was released by RCA Victor Records as catalog number 20-4953 (in USA) and by EMI on the His Master's Voice label as catalog number B 10362. It was a hit in the US, reaching the No. 6 position in the Billboard charts.

Les Paul's guitar instrumental on Capitol Records also reached the Billboard charts, with a peak position of No. 8.

The song was also covered by Bing Crosby and also by Ray Conniff with his Chorus and Orchestra in 1961, for the album "Rhapsody in Rhythm".

The song is often played on the accordion. Starting in 1947, Dick Contino popularized the song in a Horace Heidt–Philip Morris series of talent contests. This was the theme song of Myron Floren, the accordionist on The Lawrence Welk Show.

Accordionist and composer William Schimmel performs his own concert version (Reality) of "Lady of Spain" with a series of far-fetched variations on his solo CD Lady of Spain and Other Realities (Newport Classic Records).

== In popular culture ==
The song was also featured in the TV version of Jeeves and Wooster as one of the few songs that the band, featuring some of the members of the Drones Club, actually know. They went on to perform this in several locations as negro minstrels; in one scene, Hugh Laurie (as Bertie Wooster, hiding from the father of an erstwhile fiancée), performed as their vocalist.

The song was also featured in the 1977 film Slap Shot, where player/coach Reggie Dunlop (played by Paul Newman) tears up the organist's music and tells him "Don't ever play 'Lady Of Spain' again!" This line is still popular today in several teams' arenas, where the fans will respond with Newman's line if "Lady Of Spain" is played during the game.

"Lady of Spain" was performed by Marvin Suggs on his Muppaphone on The Muppet Show and appears on the Muppet Show 25th anniversary compilation The Muppet Show: Music, Mayhem, and More.

In the popular British sitcom 'Allo 'Allo!, in the episode "All in Disgeese", M. Alfonse plays "Lady of Spain" on the accordion.

The appearance of a reigning Lady of Spain is part of Cotati, California's, annual Cotati Accordion Festival since 1990. (Note: But what’s an accordion festival without the Lady of Spain? 2008 "At 2 p.m. Saturday and 1:25 p.m. Sunday she’ll make her appearance along with the release of 50 white doves." [Scott] Goree said that many people have worried about the doves these past years. "They all are trained to fly home, so people shouldn’t worry, it’s not a cruel act, just part of the show." Last year reigning Lady of Spain Ruth Edwards performed a mock-death on stage followed by a resurrection of a new Lady, Big Lou Seekins who will take over as the Lady of Spain this year. "The Lady of Spain is definitely one of the festival favorites," said Goree.)

== Bibliography ==
=== References ===
- "All in Disgeese". 'Allo 'Allo!. Season 5; Episode 25; aired February 25, 1989.
- Baker, Richard Anthony (2011). Endnote 159 from Chapter 10. Old-Time Variety: An Illustrated History. p. 229 – via Internet Archive (Kahle/Austin Foundation). LCCN 2011-453853; ISBN 978-1-8446-8124-2, ISBN 978-1-8446-8126-6; OCLC 1311047990 (all editions).
- "A Bing Crosby Discography". Bing. The Bing Crosby Show for General Electric – 9 October 1952 to 30 May 1954. International Club Crosby. OCLC 801256096.
- Catalog of Copyright Entries. Part 3 – "Musical Compositions" – New Series. Vol. 26, No. 3 (March 1931). Library of Congress, Copyright Office. 1931 – via Internet Archive.
1. "Lady of Spain" (©4 February 1931; 1 copy (unpublished) March 11, 1931; Class E (musical composition) for. 17297; Cecil Lennox, Ltd., London). Spanish quick-step or fox-trot, lyrics by Erell Reaves; music by Tolchard Evans of Great Britain; with ukulele arrangement [staff and tonic sol-fa notations]. U.S. Govt. Print. Off. 1931. p. 343 – via Internet Archive.
- RCA Victor; Abrams, Steve; Settlemier, Tyrone (December 30, 2009). "The Online Discographical Project". 20–Prefix Series: 20–4500 to 20–4999.
- 1949 Re-Issue: Ray Noble and His Orchestra: "Lady of Spain" / "I've Got My Love to Keep Me Warm" (Side A: recorded March 24, 1931 / Side B: recorded January 5, 1937, New York). 11 October 2020 – via Discogs: Release 6285789.

Al Bowlly, vocalist on side A.
Howard Phillips, vocalist on side B.

1. RCA Victor Catalog Nos → 25507–A / 25507–B. 11 October 2020.
2. Matrix Nos. (label) 20-3302-A / 20-3302-B.
3. Matrix Nos. (runout, stamped, etched) 20-3302 A 2S 39 246 32 / 20-3302 B 2S 3 28. Indianapolis Pressing.
- 1949 Re-Issue: Ray Noble and His Orchestra: "Lady of Spain" "I've Got My Love to Keep Me Warm" (RCA Victor Catalog No: 20–3302–B. Matrix Runout No.: 20–3302–B). 1949.
- "Lady of Spain". SecondHandSongs. ISSN 0140-0460; OCLC 5466850494.
- Tribune-Democrat (The); Mastovich, Mike (February 22, 2009). "Chiefs Ready to Hit the Road in Rival's Bus".
- Whitburn, Joel (1986). Joel Whitburn's Pop Memories, 1890–1954. Menomonie, Wisconsin: Record Research, Inc. p. 525. ISBN 9780898200836 – via Internet Archive (ARChive of Contemporary Music). LCCN 86-225626; ISBN 0-8982-0083-0, 978-0-8982-0083-6; OCLC 15252908 (all editions).
1. Whitburn, Joel (1986). "The Artists" → "Eddie Fischer". Record Research. p. 158. ISBN 9780898200836.
2. Whitburn, Joel (1986). "The Artists" → "Ray Noble". Record Research. p. 336. ISBN 9780898200836.
3. Whitburn, Joel (1986). "The Artists" → "Ray Noble". Record Research. p. 338. ISBN 9780898200836.
4. Whitburn, Joel (1986). "The Artists" → "Les Paul". Record Research. p. 349. ISBN 9780898200836.
5. Whitburn, Joel (1986). "The Songs" → "Lady of Spain". Record Research. p. 525. ISBN 9780898200836.
6. Whitburn, Joel (1986). "Billboard Discjockey Polls" (1953). Record Research. p. 639. ISBN 9780898200836.
- Whitcomb, Ian Timothy (1941–1920) (2007). "My Uncle Wrote 'Lady of Spain'". The Ian Whitcomb Songbook. Mel Bay. pp. 6–11 – via Google Books (limited preview). (Whitcomb, Ian (2007). altnerate link. Mel Bay Publications, Incorporated. ISBN 9780786676347 – via Internet Archive → ARChive of Contemporary Music.) www.melbay.com/20859BCDEB LCCN 2008-564273; ISBN 978-0-7866-7634-7, 0-7866-7634-5; OCLC 176947021 (all editions).
Web version: "My Uncle Wrote 'Lady of Spain'". www.picklehead.com. Website of the late Ian Whitcomb.
The author, Ian Whitcomb, by way of his mother, Eileen Whitcomb (née Eileen Mary Burningham; 1913–1998), is a grand nephew-in-law of John Edward Stanley Damerell Stevens. Put another way, he is a grand nephew of J.E.S.D. Stevens' second wife, Irene Victoria Stevens (aka Noel Damerell; aka Irenie Damerell; né Irene Victoria Burningham; 1887–1969).
