= Samuel Fox =

Samuel Fox or Foxe may refer to:

- Samuel Fox (industrialist) (1815–1887), British industrialist noted for developing the Paragon umbrella frame
- Samuel Fox (1781–1868), Nottingham philanthropist who started the Nottingham Building Society
- Samuel John Fox (1854–1911), Ontario farmer and politician
- Samuel Fox (music publisher), American music publisher, founder of Sam Fox Publishing Company
- Samuel Fox (1765–1851), Derby justice of the peace; father of William Darwin Fox
- Samuel Fox and Company, a steel company near Sheffield, England
- Samuel Foxe or Fox (1560–1630), English diarist and politician
- Samuel Foxe (MP) for Knaresborough (UK Parliament constituency)
- Sam Fox (1929–2024), American businessman and United States ambassador to Belgium
