= Paul Zamecnik =

American geneticist (1912–2009)

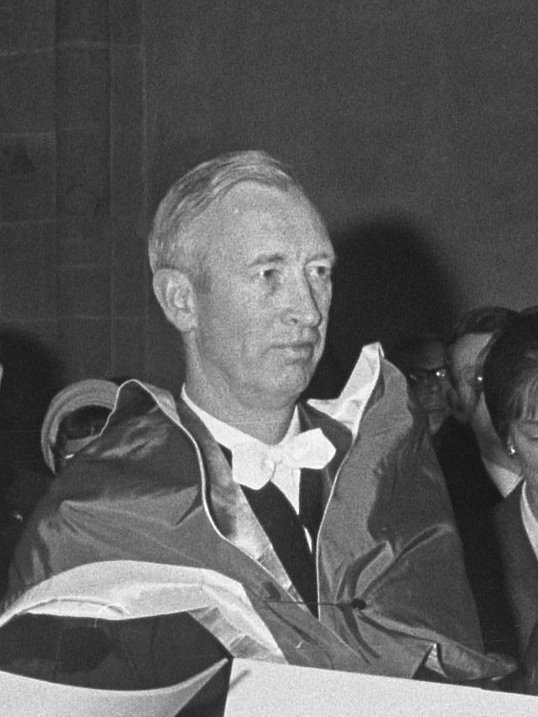
- Zamecnik in 1966
- Born: November 22, 1912; Cleveland, Ohio
- Died: October 27, 2009 (aged 96); Boston, Massachusetts
- Education: Dartmouth College; Harvard Medical School
- Known for: Inventor of antisense therapeutics
- Family: John Stepan Zamecnik (great-uncle)
- Scientific career
- Fields: Molecular biology
- Workplaces: Harvard Medical School

Paul Charles Zamecnik (November 22, 1912 – October 27, 2009) was an American scientist who played a central role in the early history of molecular biology. He was a professor of medicine at Harvard Medical School and a senior scientist at Massachusetts General Hospital.

Zamecnik pioneered the in vitro synthesis of proteins and helped elucidate the way cells generate proteins. With Mahlon Hoagland he co-discovered transfer RNA (tRNA). Through his later work, he is credited as the inventor of antisense therapeutics.

Throughout his career, Zamecnik earned over a dozen US patents for his therapeutic techniques. Up until his death in 2009 he maintained a lab at MGH where he studied the application of synthetic oligonucleotides (antisense hybrids) for chemotherapeutic treatment of drug resistant and XDR tuberculosis in his later years.

== Early life ==
Paul Zamecnik was born in Cleveland, Ohio to John Charles Zamecnik (1879–1930) and Mary Gertrude Mccarthy (1883–1937). John's first cousin was the composer John Stepan Zamecnik. Paul's paternal grandparents Jan Nepomucký Zámečník (1842-1915) and Konstancie Hrubecká (1843–1924) were Czech immigrants from Budičovice and Skály respectively. His mother's parents were Irish immigrants.

He attended Dartmouth College, majored in chemistry and zoology, and received his AB degree in 1933. He then attended Harvard Medical School and received his MD degree in 1936. Between 1936 and 1939, he worked at Collis P. Huntington Memorial Hospital in Boston, Harvard Medical School, and Lakeside Hospital in Cleveland.

== Career ==
During his Lakeside Hospital internship, Zamecnik became interested in how cells regulate growth, and hence, in protein chemistry. He was awarded a Finney-Howell Fellowship and a Moseley Traveling Fellowship to go to the Carlsberg Laboratory in Copenhagen where he worked with Dr. Kai Linderstrom-Lang. His planned time in Copenhagen was cut short because of World War II—the Germans occupied Denmark from April 1940.

He returned to Boston where he became an assistant physician at the Huntington Memorial Hospital, studying the toxic factors involved in traumatic shock for a wartime Office of Scientific Research and Development project led by Huntington director Joseph Charles Aub. After a year in New York at the Rockefeller Institute for Medical Research studying protein synthesis with Max Bergmann, he join the faculty of medicine at Harvard Medical School in 1942, becoming an instructor and then professor of medicine, where he served until retiring as the Collis P. Huntington Professor of Oncologic Medicine, Emeritus in 1979.

After retiring from Harvard Medical School, he continued his research at the Worcester Foundation for Biomedical Research with Hoagland. When the foundation merged with the University of Massachusetts Medical School in 1997, Zamecnik moved his laboratory to MGH, where he continued to work until several weeks before his death.

Paul Zamecnik is generally regarded as the founder of antisense therapy.

Zamecnik authored or co-authored 210 peer-reviewed scientific articles. He won many distinguished awards, including the National Cancer Society National Award in 1968, National Medal of Science in 1991, and the first-ever Lasker Lifetime Achievement Award in 1996. Zamecnik was also a member of the U.S. National Academy of Sciences, American Academy of Arts and Sciences, American Society of Biological Chemistry, American Association for Cancer Research (President 1964–1965), Association of American Physicians, Royal Danish Academy of Sciences and Letters and the American Philosophical Society.

== Personal life ==
Zamecnik married Mary Connor in 1936 (deceased 2005), and together they had three children.

Zamecnik died on October 27, 2009, at his home in Boston. He was 96 years old.

== Sources ==
- Hans-Jörg Rheinberger. Toward a History of Epistemic Things: Synthesizing Proteins in the Test Tube. Stanford: Stanford University Press, 1997.
