= Brian Wells =

Brian Wells may refer to:

- Brian Wells (figure skater) (born 1970), American figure skater
- Brian Douglas Wells (1956–2003), American pizza delivery man killed by a bomb

== See also ==
- Bryan Wells (disambiguation)
