= WhoSampled =

Website cataloging sampling in music

- Company type: Subsidiary
- Website type: Music website; music samples database
- Available in: English
- Founded: 2008; 18 years ago, in London, England
- Owner: Spotify Technology S.A. (2025-present)
- Founder: Nadav Poraz
- Website: www.whosampled.com
- Commercial: Yes
- Registration: Optional
- Launched: 1 October 2008; 18 years ago
- Current status: Active

WhoSampled is a website and app database of information about sampled music or sample-based music, interpolations, cover songs, and remixes. As of May 2026, the website contains 1,334,420 songs and 415,918 artists in its catalog.

In November 2025, it was acquired by Spotify. The acquisition promised users reduced moderation waiting times, elimination of display advertisements and free apps with full functionality.

== History ==
Nadav Poraz founded the site in London in 2008, as a way to track musical samples and cover songs. Mobile apps were released in 2012 and 2014 for iPhone and Android, respectively. The website's database is user-generated and reviewed by moderators before the content goes live. As of 2026, the site's most sampled track is "Amen, Brother" by the Winstons, which contains the most sampled drum break in music history, having been sampled in more than 7,000 songs.

In 2016, a year after adding support for movie and television clips, it partnered with Spotify and introduced 6D, a six degrees of separation-inspired game which tracks relationships between artists, producers, and their tracks. In 2017, WhoSampled partnered with KPM and Ableton and organized the third 'Samplethon' competition at Point Blank Studios in London. WhoSampled was acquired by Spotify in 2025. The platform and brand are operated by Spotify and subscription fees were removed.

== See also ==
- Discogs
- Interpolation
- Pandora
- SecondHandSongs, a similar website focused on cover songs
