= Bryan Wells =

American composer, songwriter, pianist, and music director

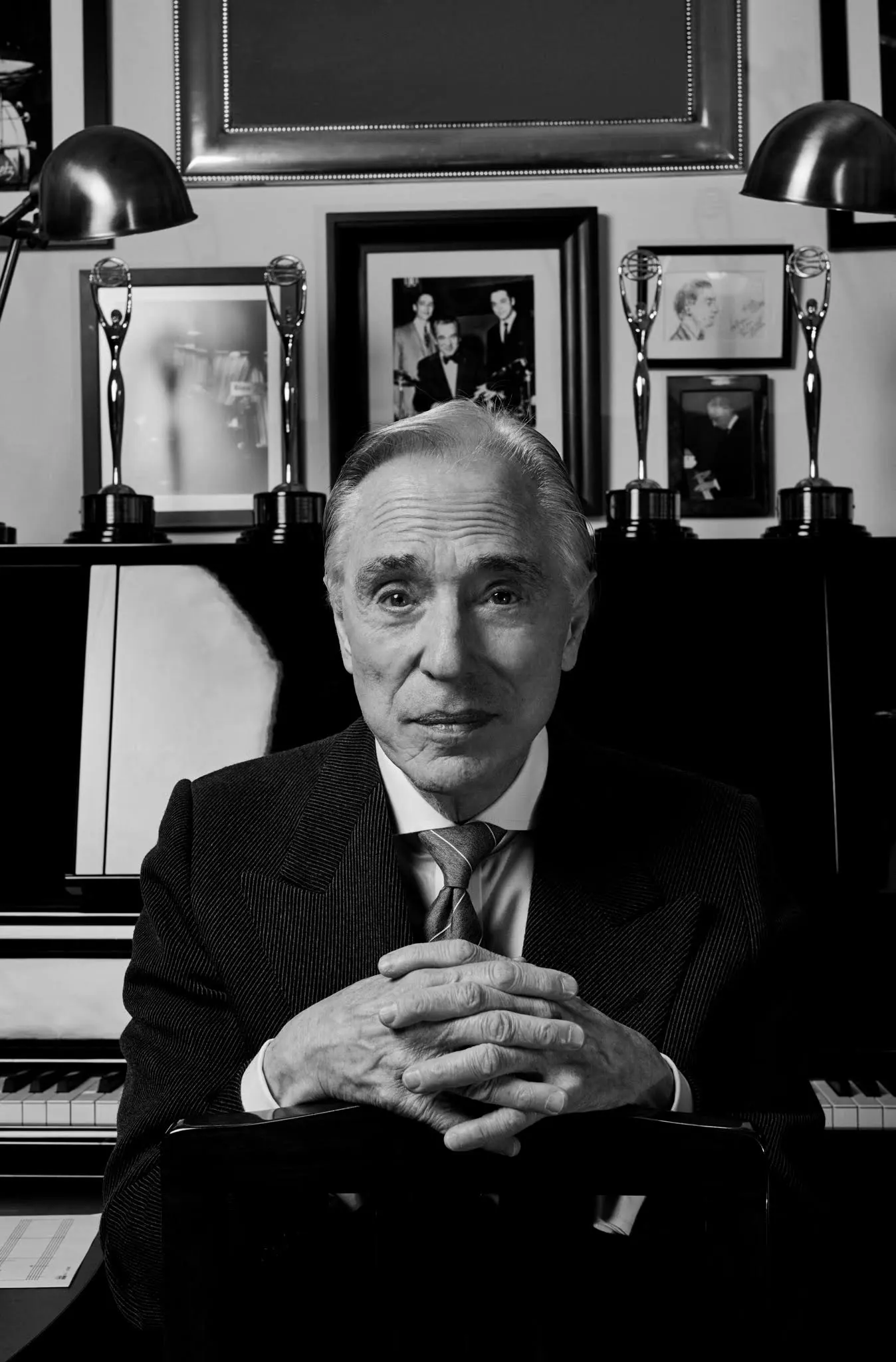
- Wells in 2022

Background information
- Occupations: Composer, songwriter, pianist, music director
- Instrument: Piano
- Years active: 1960s–present

Bryan Wells is an American composer, songwriter, pianist, and music director. He is best known for his collaboration with Motown lyricist Ron Miller, with whom he wrote songs recorded by Stevie Wonder, including "A Place in the Sun", "Yester-Me, Yester-You, Yesterday", and "Someday at Christmas".

== Career ==
Wells worked as a songwriter for Motown during the 1960s. He began collaborating with lyricist Ron Miller after Miller heard him playing piano in Detroit. According to Wells, Miller was then under contract at Motown Records and was looking for a new composer partner.

Wells later described the working relationship to Classic Motown, saying, "I wrote the melody and he wrote the lyrics. Our division of labor was well-defined."

The Wells-Miller partnership produced several songs recorded by Stevie Wonder. Classic Motown credits Ron Miller and Bryan Wells among the songwriters on Wonder's Someday at Christmas album and identifies the pair as responsible for Wonder songs including "A Place in the Sun" and "Yester-Me, Yester-You, Yesterday". AllMusic lists Miller and Wells as composers on the Someday at Christmas tracks "Someday at Christmas", "One Little Christmas Tree", and "A Warm Little Home on a Hill".

"A Place in the Sun" was recorded by Stevie Wonder and released by Tamla in 1966. SecondHandSongs credits the music to Wells and the lyrics to Miller.

"Someday at Christmas" was first released as a Tamla single in 1966 and later appeared as the title track of Wonder's 1967 Christmas album. Classic Motown has described the song as Motown's most-covered holiday song, citing recordings by the Jackson 5, the Temptations, Pearl Jam, Jack Johnson, Justin Bieber, LeAnn Rimes, and others.

In 1970, Stevie Wonder and Syreeta Wright attended a cabaret performance by Wells at the Pontchartrain Hotel in Detroit, where Wonder joined Wells on stage.

After his Motown period, Wells worked in New York as a pianist, composer, and music director. 54 Below describes him as active on the New York jazz scene and credits him as a pianist, composer, and music director. The same source states that Wells collaborated with Bette Midler as music director and appeared with her at the Continental Baths.

== Awards and recognition ==
Wells's official resume lists Gold Records for "A Place in the Sun" and "Yester-Me, Yester-You, Yesterday", both recorded by Stevie Wonder. His resume also lists four Clio Awards and ASCAP Popular Panel Awards. Artist profiles published by 54 Below and Broadjam also credit Wells with four Clio Awards for advertising music compositions.

== Selected compositions ==
- "A Place in the Sun" — recorded by Stevie Wonder; music by Bryan Wells and lyrics by Ron Miller.
- "Someday at Christmas" — recorded by Stevie Wonder; written by Bryan Wells and Ron Miller.
- "Yester-Me, Yester-You, Yesterday" — recorded by Stevie Wonder; written by Bryan Wells and Ron Miller.
- "One Little Christmas Tree" — recorded by Stevie Wonder; written by Bryan Wells and Ron Miller.
- "A Warm Little Home on a Hill" — recorded by Stevie Wonder; written by Bryan Wells and Ron Miller.
