= Bryan Wells (disambiguation) =

Bryan Wells is an American composer, songwriter, pianist, and music director.

Bryan Wells may also refer to:

- Bomber Wells (Bryan Douglas Wells; 1930–2008), English cricketer
- Bryan Wells (ice hockey) (born 1966), Canadian ice hockey player and coach
