= The Wedding March (1928 film) =

1928 film directed by Erich von Stroheim

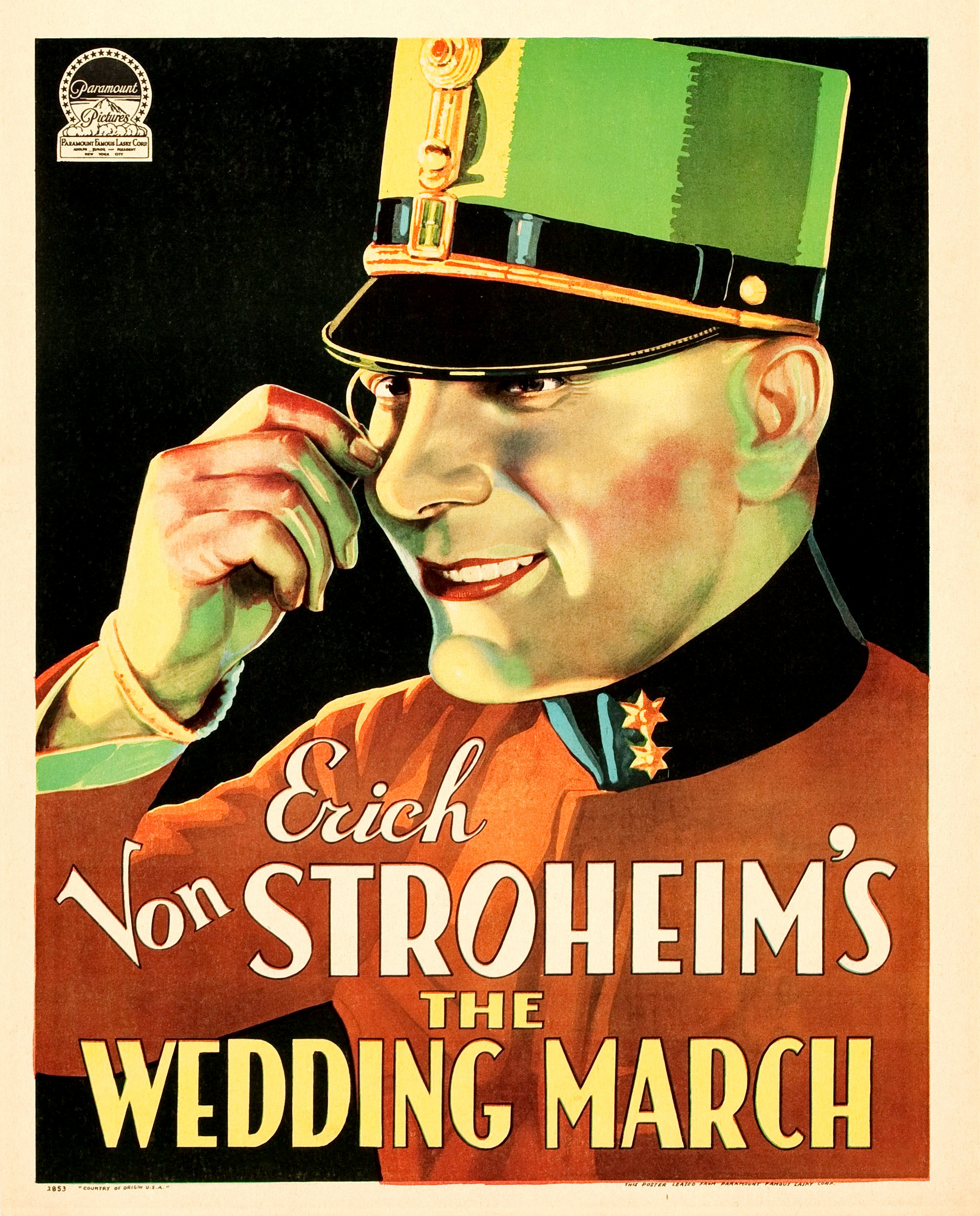
- Theatrical release poster
- Directed by: Erich von Stroheim
- Written by: Harry Carr
- Produced by: Jesse L. Lasky; Pat Powers; Adolph Zukor
- Starring: Erich von Stroheim; Fay Wray; George Fawcett; George Nichols; ZaSu Pitts; Maude George
- Cinematography: Roy H. Klaffki, Ray Rennahan, William C. McGann, Hal Mohr, Ben F. Reynolds, Buster Sorenson, Harris Thorpe
- Edited by: Frank E. Hull; Josef von Sternberg
- Music by: Louis De Francesco; Adolph Deutsch; Vernon Duke; J. S. Zamecnik
- Distributed by: Paramount Pictures
- Release date: October 6, 1928
- Running time: 113 minutes
- Country: United States
- Language: Sound (Synchronized) (English Intertitles)
- Budget: $1,250,000

The Wedding March is a 1928 American synchronized sound romantic drama film written and directed by Erich von Stroheim. While the film has no audible dialog, it was released with a synchronized musical score with sound effects using both the sound-on-disc and sound-on-film process. The film stars Erich von Stroheim, Fay Wray and ZaSu Pitts. Paramount Pictures forced von Stroheim to create two films from the footage, the second being The Honeymoon (eventually re-edited back into one film for a re-release). The Honeymoon is now considered lost, the only known copy destroyed in a fire in France in 1959. In 2003, The Wedding March was selected for preservation in the United States National Film Registry by the Library of Congress as being "culturally, historically or aesthetically significant." The film entered the public domain in the United States in 2024.

== Plot ==
The film

In Vienna in 1914, Prince Nicki is the scion of a rundown noble family and is commander of a cavalry regiment.

During a parade in front of the St. Stephen's Cathedral, Nicki notices beautiful innkeeper's daughter Mitzi in the crowd. Mitzi is eating with her family as her butcher fiancé Schani grotesquely spits and embarrasses Mitzi. Nicki and Mitzi flirt with each other during the parade. During a gun salute Nicki's horse becomes afraid and injures Mitzi, who is sent to the hospital. Nicki also has Schani arrested at this time. Nicki visits Mitzi at the hospital and later in the pub where she works as a harpist. They begin to go on dates and fall in love.

Knowing of his family's financial troubles, Nicki is approached by a wealthy factory owner to marry his daughter Cecelia in exchange for a noble title. Nicki initially refuses but finally agrees to marry Cecelia. Schani is released from prison and finds out about the relationship between Mitzi and Nicki, and shows Mitzi a newspaper article announcing the marriage of Nicki and Cecelia. Mitzi remains calm and tells Schani that she hates him and still loves Nicki. Enraged Schani tries to rape Mitzi, but his father prevents it at the last moment. Schani decides to murder Nicki after the wedding.

The marriage of Nicki and Cecelia is celebrated. Schani is waiting for Nicki with a gun at the church. At the last moment Mitzi appears and promises to marry Schani if he does not kill Nicki. Nicki and Cecelia get into their coach and drive away.

=== The Honeymoon ===
The Honeymoon depicts the honeymoon of Prince Nicki in the Alps, and the wedding of Mitzi and Schani. Mitzi still loves Nicki, and jealous Schani decides once again to kill the prince. Schani shoots at Nicki, but Cecelia throws herself in front of Nicki. Schani becomes a fugitive and goes into hiding. Nicki and Mitzi meet one last time, where Mitzi tells Nicki that she will go to a convent. Nicki goes off to war, where he is killed.

== Cast ==
- Erich von Stroheim as Prince Nickolas von Wildeliebe-Rauffenburg, called Nicki
- Fay Wray as Mitzi, Mitzerl Schrammell
- Matthew Betz as Schani Eberle, a Butcher
- ZaSu Pitts as Cecelia Schweisser
- George Fawcett as Prince Ottokar von Wildeliebe-Rauffenburg
- Maude George as Princess Maria, Nicki's mother
- George Nichols as Fortunat Schweisser, the Industrialist
- Dale Fuller as Katerina Schrammel, Mitzi's mother
- Cesare Gravina as Martin Schrammell, Mitzi's father
- Sidney Bracey as Navratil
- Hughie Mack as Eberle
- Elena Jurado Asian women in Viennese brothel (uncredited)
- Anton Vaverka as Emperor Franz-Josef

== Music ==
The film featured a theme song entitled "Paradise" which was composed by Harry D. Kerr (words) and John Stepan Zamecnik (music).

== Production ==
=== Pre-production ===
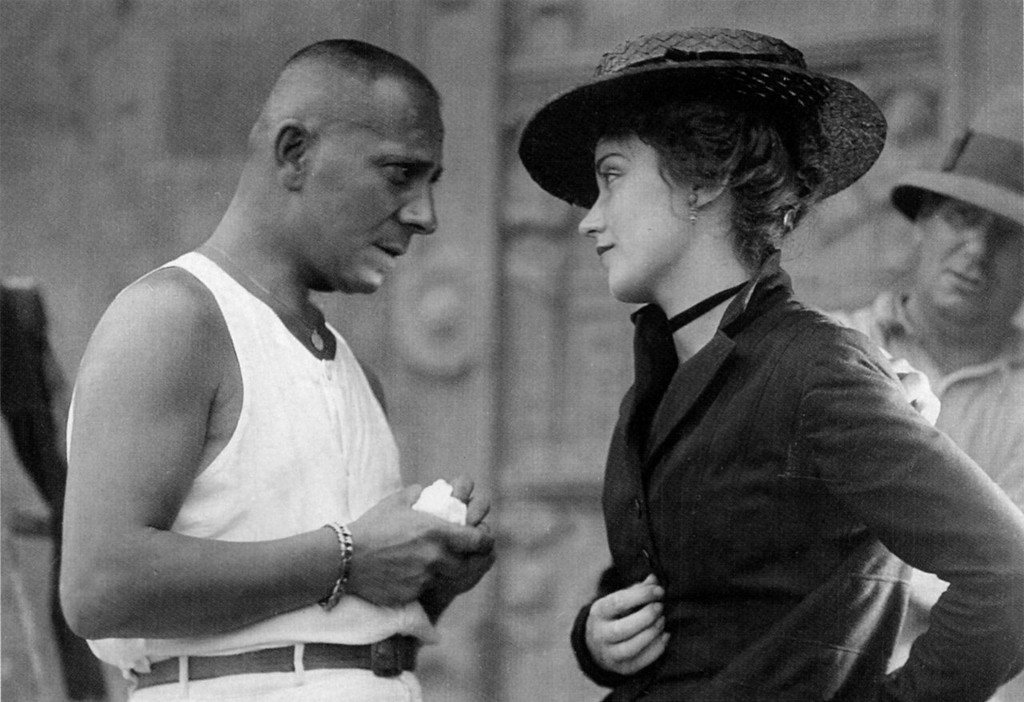
Erich von Stroheim and Fay Wray on the set of the film The Wedding March

Shortly after completing The Merry Widow and having had a bad working experience at Metro-Goldwyn-Mayer, Stroheim met independent film producer Pat Powers and convinced Powers to finance The Wedding March. Stroheim's script was completed by March 1926 and was 154 pages long. The currently available version of the film depicts the first 67 pages of the original script.

As was often the case with films directed by Stroheim, the film's accuracy resulted in high expenses and production values. Stroheim rebuilt huge sets for St. Stephen's Cathedral, the streets surrounding it, various palatial rooms and an entire apple orchard with thousands of blossoms individually tied to the trees. Stroheim defended his elaborate set choices by stating “They say I give them sewers — and dead cats! This time I am giving them beauty. Beauty — and apple blossoms! More than they can stand!”.

=== Filming ===
Shooting began in June 1926 and lasted until Stroheim was finally shut down by Powers in January 1927. A reporter allowed onto the film's set reported Stroheim's perfectionism and indifference to time and money, and stated that Stroheim once told his cast and crew that if necessary they would film 24,000 takes of a scene until they got it right. Over the six months of filming, Stroheim shot over 200,000 feet of film. The film's original budget was estimated at $300,000 ($5,456,000 today). By the time Pat Powers shut down production, the budget had risen to $1,250,000 ($23,168,000 today).

=== Editing ===
In January 1927, Stroheim screened the footage for Powers and began to edit the film, wanting to release two separate films to be shown on consecutive nights. His initial cut of part 1 was 25,795 feet long (a little over four-and-a-half hours), after which he refused to cut the film further. Powers took control of the film. Powers had convinced Paramount Studios to distribute the film and, after not being sure how to release it after twelve months of editing, they finished a shorter cut of the entire two-part film in January 1928. Paramount hired film director Josef von Sternberg to re-edit the film to a more manageable length. Studio records show that Stroheim approved of Sternberg, but Stroheim later partially blamed Sternberg for the film's re-cutting. Stroheim's first cut of part two was 22,484 feet. He then cut it down to between 15,000 and 20,000 feet before the studio and Sternberg made their cut. Only 4,500 feet of Stroheim's original cut were used in the final film. In 1947, Stroheim claimed that he had finished editing the first part of the film, but never completed the second part after it was given to Sternberg. He also said that the film's final budget was $900,000 and that Powers and Paramount made a profit from the film, while he was denied his contractual 25% of the film's gross. This statement is untrue and the film's final budget, taking two years of interest, the film's color sequences, and creating sound disks for the release into account, was well over a million dollars.

The Wedding March was previewed at the Egyptian Theater in Long Beach, California the following March. After the disastrous preview, Paramount decided to release The Wedding March as two films after all, with part two being re-titled The Honeymoon. The Wedding March was 14 reels long and The Honeymoon was eight reels long. The first three reels of The Honeymoon was footage from The Wedding March that was used as exposition. Only five reels of Stroheim's original footage of the second half of The Wedding March was used, which amounted to approximately 50 minutes and was only one fifth of Stroheim's original cut.

== Reception ==
The Wedding March was released in October 1928, while The Honeymoon was only released in Europe and South America several months later. It was a box office failure and was released just as silent films were beginning to become unsuccessful after "talkies" had taken over the film market. Variety called it "a ponderous, slow moving production."

Hanns G. Lustig said that the film was "a colored fairy tale. But the colors are poisonous. Stroheim is a hard man. But his toughness shows the memory of the tender falsehood of dreams. And his melancholy revenge for their existence is brutal cartoons. A unique, exciting event."

== Legacy ==
In 1950, Henri Langlois of the Cinémathèque Française gave Stroheim the opportunity to re-edit The Wedding March and The Honeymoon from prints that he owned. Stroheim added sound effects and put certain scenes back in his original order. The last known copy of The Honeymoon was destroyed in a fire at Cinémathèque Française on July 10, 1959. Langlois claimed that the film had "died voluntarily."

The reputation of The Wedding March began to grow after Stroheim's death. Langlois presented the film at the Lincoln Center for the Performing Arts in 1965, calling it a film "like a torso without a head." The film was screened at the 3rd New York Film Festival, where it was mostly received favorably. However, Bosley Crowther called it "disappointing". It was screened at the Lincoln Center again in 1970 and received a standing ovation.

Paramount first released the film on VHS in 1987. However they replaced J. S. Zamecnik's full orchestral score with a new pipe organ score. The Synchronized sound version was restored by the Vitaphone Soundtrack Project and released on YouTube in 2024.

== Accolades ==
The film is recognized by American Film Institute in these lists:

- 2002: AFI's 100 Years...100 Passions – Nominated

== See also ==
- List of early color feature films
- List of early sound feature films (1926–1929)

== Bibliography ==
- Lennig, Arthur (2000). Stroheim. Lexington, Kentucky: The University Press of Kentucky. ISBN 9780813121383.
