= J. Bodewalt Lampe =

- Also known as: "J.B.", Ribé Danmark
- Born: Jens Bodewalt Lampe; November 8, 1869; Ribe, Denmark
- Died: May 26, 1929 (aged 59) New York City
- Genres: Jazz, ragtime, march, cakewalk, and song
- Occupations: Composer, pianist
- Instruments: Violin, trombone, clarinet, cornet, piano
- Years active: 1893–1929

Jens Bodewalt Lampe (November 8, 1869 – May 26, 1929) was a Danish-born American composer, arranger, performer and band-leader of ragtime and syncopated dance music.

Lampe was born in Ribe, Denmark to Christian and Sophia Lampe. In 1873, his family moved to St. Paul, Minnesota, where his father took over leadership of the Great Western Band. Lampe was a child prodigy on the violin and became the first chair violinist for the Minneapolis Symphony at age 16. He met and married his wife, Josephine, while receiving tuition in Chicago in 1888. In the early 1890s, he and his wife moved to Buffalo, where they had four children, Walter, Petra, Dorothy and Joseph Dell (known later as "Dell"). At this time, he began composing and publishing his own music and led a dance orchestra.

In 1900, a year after the success of Joplin's "Maple Leaf Rag", he published his most successful and enduring song "Creole Belles", a rag or cakewalk that sold more than a million copies in sheet music. The song was recorded by Sousa's Band in 1902 and has been a staple of jazz bands and ragtime pianists into the 21st century. He also collected, and may possibly have composed, Mysterioso Pizzicato, the piece of photoplay music whose main motif became a standard cue for stealth and villainy and has seen "hundreds of tongue-in-cheek uses" in features and cartoons.
