= If (They Made Me a King) =

Single by Perry Como
- B-side: "Zing Zing - Zoom Zoom"
- Released: December 1950
- Genre: Vocal
- Length: 3:12
- Label: RCA Victor
- Songwriters: Tolchard Evans, Robert Hargreaves, Stanley J. Damerell

Perry Como singles chronology
"You're Just in Love" (1950)	"If" (1950)	"There's No Boat Like a Rowboat" (1951)

"If (They Made Me a King)" is a popular song with music written by Tolchard Evans and the lyrics written by Robert Hargreaves and Stanley J. Damerell. The song was written in 1934, but the most popular versions were recorded in 1950–1951. Perry Como's version, recorded November 28, 1950, was a number-one hit on the Billboard charts for eight weeks. The Como version was released under the following labels and catalog numbers:

- In the United States, by RCA Victor, as catalog number 47–3997 with the flip side "Zing Zing - Zoom Zoom"
- In Argentina, by Discos RCA Victor Argentina, as catalog number 68–0583 with the flip side "Zing Zing - Zoom Zoom"
- In the United Kingdom, by His Master's Voice, as catalog number B-10042 with the flip side "Zing Zing - Zoom Zoom"
- In Germany, by Electrola, as catalog number X-7293 with the flip side being a Tony Martin/Dinah Shore recording of "A Penny a Kiss"

== Other charted versions in 1951 ==
- Jo Stafford also recorded the song (with "queen" for "king" in the lyric). Her version, with the Paul Weston orchestra backing her, was recorded on October 16, 1950, and released by Columbia Records as catalog number 39082. This reached No. 8 in the Billboard charts.
- Billy Eckstine recorded the song December 21, 1950, which reached No. 10.
- Dean Martin recorded the song December 2, 1950, which reached No. 14.
- Guy Lombardo & His Royal Canadians (vocal by Bill Flanagan) - peaked at No. 20.
- The Ink Spots - peaked at No. 23.
- Jan Garber & His Orchestra (vocal by Roy Cordell) - peaked at No. 26.
- Vic Damone - peaked at No. 28.

== Other versions ==
- Bing Crosby sang it twice on his radio show, first on March 14, 1951 and later on March 28, 1951.
- Louis Armstrong - recorded February 6, 1951 for Decca Records (catalog No. 27481).
- In 1961, doowop group "The Paragons" released a version which peaked at No. 82 and spent 5 weeks in the Top 100.
- The Bachelors - Presenting: The Bachelors (1964).
- Timi Yuro - this was another distaff version (substituting "queen" for "king") and included in her album The Amazing Timi Yuro (1964).
- Jerry Vale - Jerry Vale's Greatest Hits (1961).
- Al Hirt released a version of the song in 1969. The song reached No. 16 on the Adult Contemporary chart and No. 116 on the Billboard Hot 100.
