= Samuel Fox (music publisher) =

American publisher (1884–1971)

Samuel Fox (1884–1971) was an American music publisher and founder of the Sam Fox Publishing Company.

== Early life ==
The son of Hungarian immigrants Simon and Sara Klein Fox, Samuel Fox was born at Zanesville, Ohio on May 15, 1884. His father was a traveling salesman who moved the family to Cleveland, Ohio, and Fox resided with his parents and sister Hattie until the age of 25. As a young man, Fox worked as conductor of the Central High School Orchestras in Cleveland, an activity that served as a foundation for his pioneering work as a publisher of music for educational training and performance. With a $300 loan in 1906, Fox founded Sandbox Music Publishing company, later called Sam Fox Publishing Company.

== Early music publishing ==
His early efforts included the publishing of piano novelties, but he quickly branched into other types of music. Early on, Fox became acquainted with John Stepan Zamecnik, who in 1907 was named music director of the newly opened Cleveland Hippodrome Theater. The business arrangement between Fox and Zamecnik flourished and the music director became the major composer and music director for Sam Fox Publishing Company.

== Career ==
In 1917, Fox became the exclusive publisher for John Philip Sousa, the American march king, and maintained a working relationship with the musician until Sousa's death in 1932. It was during the same period Fox experienced an international hit with the publishing of "Nola," which was followed by "Lady of Spain" and "Neapolitan Nights," both of which also achieved acclaim. His film scoring for Hollywood companies was solidified with contracts with Fox Films and Movietone News as their exclusive musical producer. The Hollywood film work led to his publication of songs in Fox films, including "The Good Ship Lollipop" sung by Shirley Temple.

== Later life ==
Fox later opened an office in New York, which was run by his son Frederick. Additionally, Sam Fox Publishing Company had representatives in offices in London, Paris, Berlin, Melbourne, and other cities worldwide. Fox entered the Broadway field with the publishing in 1947 of the film score for "Brigadoon," followed by the prize winning "Man of La Mancha." He died November 30, 1971, in San Francisco, California, at the age of 87.

== Family ==
Fox married Elsa A Buerger and they had two children, Frederick and Muriel.

After his first wife, Elsa, died after 1930, Fox remarried in 1966 at the age of 78 to Clara M. Klein of San Francisco, California.
