= John Stepan Zamecnik =

American composer and conductor (1872–1953)

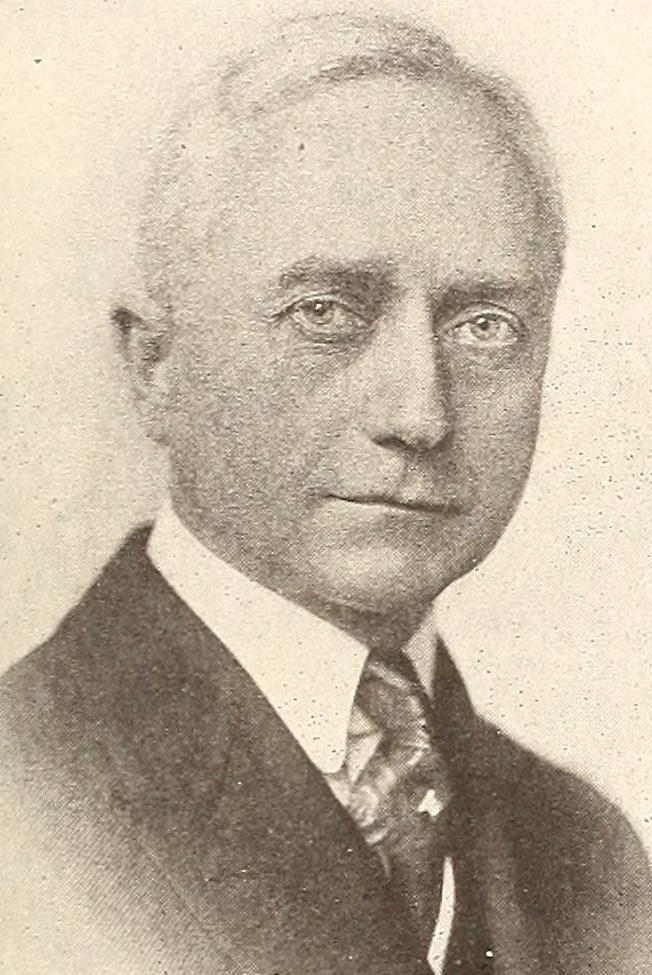
- Zamecnik c. 1927
- Born: May 14, 1872; Cleveland, Ohio, U.S.
- Died: June 13, 1953 (aged 81); Los Angeles, California, U.S.
- Other names: J.S. Zamecnik; Dorothy Lee; Lionel Baxter; Robert L. Creighton; Arturo de Castro "Josh and Ted"; Jane Hathaway; Kathryn Hawthorne; Roberta Hudson; Ioane Kawelo; J. Edgar Lowell; Jules Reynard; Frederick Van Norman; Hal Vinton; Grant Wellesley
- Education: Prague Conservatory
- Family: Paul Zamecnik (great-nephew)

John Stepan Zamecnik
- Occupation: Conductor
- Instrument: Violin

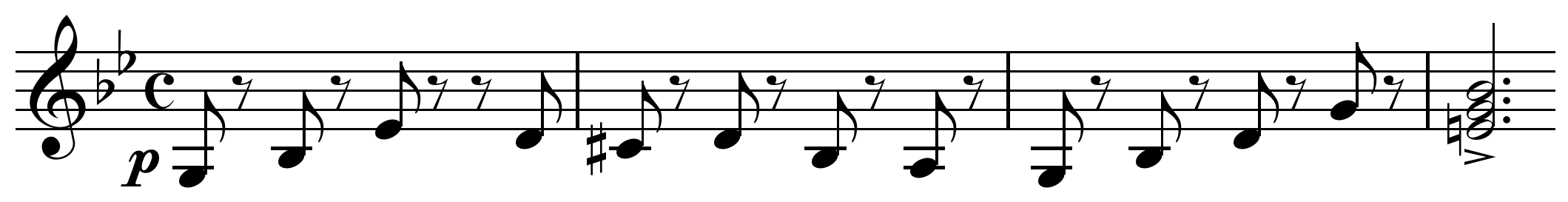
Theme, Mysterious Burglar Music, intended for photoplay musicians use, by Zamecnik (1913)

John Stepan Zamecnik (May 14, 1872 in Cleveland, Ohio – June 13, 1953 in Los Angeles, California) was an American composer and conductor. He is best known for the "photoplay music" he composed for use during silent films by pianists, organists, and orchestras.

Zamecnik used many pseudonyms, including Dorothy Lee, Lionel Baxter, R.L. (Robert) Creighton, Arturo de Castro, "Josh and Ted", J. (Jane) Hathaway, Kathryn Hawthorne, Roberta Hudson, Ioane Kawelo, J. Edgar Lowell, Jules Reynard, F. (Frederick) Van Norman, Hal Vinton and Grant Wellesley.

== Early life ==
John Zamecnik was born in Cleveland to Czech immigrants Josef Zámečník (1832-1915) and Kateřina Hrubecká (1838-1908). Josef was born in Budičovice and Kateřina was born in the nearby Skály. The couple married in Heřmaň in 1862. Josef's brother Jan later married Kateřina's sister Konstancie in the same place in 1869. Both couples immigrated to Ohio bringing Josef's daughters and perhaps other relatives. Jan's grandson was the geneticist Paul Zamecnik.

== Career ==
Zamecnik studied at the Prague Conservatory of Music under Antonín Dvořák in the mid-1890s, completing his classes there in 1897.

In 1899 Zamecnik finally returned to the United States. While living in Cleveland, where he worked as a violinist and composer, he also played in the Pittsburgh Symphony Orchestra as a violinist under Victor Herbert. In 1907, Zamecnik became music director of the newly constructed Hippodrome Theater in Cleveland, Ohio. When the Hippodrome commenced with the screening of silent films, Zamecnik began to compose music scores for them. They were published by Samuel Fox, whose company was the first to publish original film scores in the United States. Fox published the Zamecnik-composed Sam Fox Moving Picture Music volumes, consisting of incidental music and leitmotifs such as "Mysterious Burglar Music", intended for when a burglar is on screen.

Jack Shaindlin, music director of Movietone News in New York City, adapted the first theme of Zamecnik's popular circus march World Events (1935) for the Main and End Title theme of Movietone Newsreels. Jackie Gleason's American Scene Magazine television series in the 1950s used this version to open a skit that parodied current events.

In 2011 Paramount Pictures secured the original manuscript score of the cues composed by Zamecnik for Wings from the Library of Congress. A new recording was produced for the 24 January 2012 launch of the Wings DVD and Blu-ray.

== Later life and legacy ==
Zamecnik died in 1953.

His scores are held in the University of Southern California's Cinematic Arts Library.

== Compositions ==
=== Works for orchestra ===
- 1919 My Cairo Love, Egytische serenade
- 1921 Somewhere In Naples
- Babylonian Nights
- China Doll Parade, for orchestra and organ
- I Gathered a Rose I gathered a Rose
- Treacherous Knave
- Wings

=== Works for band ===
- 1928 Scarlet Mask, overture
- 1930 Olympia, overture
- 1935 World Events, March
- 1936 1776, overture
- 1939 Fortuna, overture
- Indian Dawn, serenade
- Neapolitan Nights
- Southern Miniatures, suite

=== Vocal music ===
- 1915 California - words: Adele Humphrey

=== Film ===
- 1923 The Covered Wagon
- 1925 Neapolitan Nights
- 1926 Old Ironsides - "Sons of the Sea"
- 1927 Wings
- 1927 The Rough Riders - "The Trumpet Calls"
- 1928 Abie's Irish Rose
- 1928 The Wedding March
- 1929 Betrayal
- 1929 Redskin
- 1930 Bear Shooters
- 1930 When the Wind Blows
- 1931 Strictly Dishonorable
- 1931 Pardon Us - Gaol Birds - Jailbirds
- 1932 Wild Girl - Salomy Jane
- 1932 Chandu the Magician
- 1932 My Pal, the King
- 1932 Igloo
- 1932 Impatient Maiden
- 1932 Looking on the Bright Side
- 1933 The Worst Woman in Paris?
- 1933 The Power and the Glory - "Power and Glory"
- 1933 Paddy the Next Best Thing
- 1933 Deluge
- 1933 Shanghai Madness
- 1933 The Man Who Dared
- 1933 The Warrior's Husband
- 1933 Zoo in Budapest
- 1933 Dangerously Yours
- 1933 Face in the Sky
- 1933 Cavalcade
- 1934 Dos más uno dos - "Two and One Two"
- 1934 Baby Take a Bow
- 1934 Midnight - "Call It Murder"
- 1935 The Fighting Marines
- 1935 The Adventures of Rex and Rinty
- 1935 Our Little Girl
- 1935 Charlie Chan in Egypt
- 1937 SOS Coast Guard
- 1937 Come On, Cowboys!
- 1937 Riders of the Whistling Skull - "The Golden Trail"
- 1938 The Terror of Tiny Town

== Orchestra ==
- 1916 Nola, Felix Arndt (1889–1918)
