= Tolchard Evans =

British musician (1901–1978)

- Born: Sydney Edmund Tolchard Evans; 20 September 1901; Kilburn, London, England
- Died: 12 March 1978 (aged 76) Willesden, London
- Genre: Traditional pop
- Occupations: Songwriter, pianist, bandleader
- Years active: 1919–1960s

Sydney Edmund Tolchard Evans (20 September 1901 – 12 March 1978) was a British songwriter, composer, pianist and bandleader, whose works were popular from the 1920s to the 1960s.

== Early life ==
He was born in West Kilburn, London, the son of Edmund George Evans and his wife Maud, née Tolchard. The family later moved to Willesden, where Evans lived for the rest of his life.

== Career ==
Evans started playing piano at the age of six, and studied orchestration and conducting with a view to becoming a classical musician, but in 1919 joined the staff of the Lawrence Wright popular music publishing company. In 1924, he left to work as a pianist for silent films and dance bands, before establishing his own band at the Queen's Hotel, Westcliff-on-Sea, later moving to the Palace Hotel, Southend, where he stayed through most of the 1930s.

He also achieved success as a songwriter, with his song "Barcelona" (1926) becoming an international hit. With lyricists Stanley Damerell and Robert Hargreaves, he formed the Cecil Lennox song publishing company, which published one of their most successful collaborations, "Lady of Spain" (co-credited to "Erell Reaves", a pseudonym for Damerell and Hargreaves), in 1931. Using an unfamiliar paso doble rhythm, it was turned down by several bands before being made successful by Jack Payne. He achieved further success as a songwriter with "Let's All Sing like the Birdies Sing" (1932), co-written with Damerell, Hargreaves, and Harry Tilsley, and successfully recorded by Henry Hall; "Faith" and "If (They Made Me a King)" (1934); "The Song of the Trees" and "There's a Lovely Lake in London" (1935); "I Hear Your Voice" (1942); and "Sailor, Who are You Dreaming of Tonight?" (1944). At one time, four of his songs were being used by major London dance bands as signature tunes.

He was often featured on BBC radio, notably with his Tuneful Twenties series from 1949 onwards. In 1951, his career was boosted when Perry Como's version of "If" sold over a million copies. Evans spent some time in the US, and the following year Eddie Fisher's recording of "Lady of Spain" also became a best-seller. His songs also continued to be successful in Britain, with "Ev'rywhere" winning an Ivor Novello Award in 1955, and David Whitfield having UK hits with "My September Love" (1956) and "I'll Find You" (1957). His own recording of "The Singing Piano" (1959) was used as a signature tune at Butlins holiday camps. He also appeared on British television, in such programmes as The Black and White Minstrel Show and The Billy Cotton Band Show. In 1973 he won an Ivor Novello Award for outstanding services to British music.

== Cover versions ==
"Hunting Tigers out in 'Indiah'", by Evans, Damerell and Hargreaves, was covered by the Bonzo Dog Band on their 1969 album Tadpoles.

== Personal life and death ==
He married Phyllis Elizabeth Mayhead in 1931; they had two sons. Tolchard Evans recorded an episode of the BBC radio interview programme Desert Island Discs in 1976, which was re-discovered in 2022. He died in London in 1978, aged 76.
