= Skály (Strakonice District) =

- Municipality
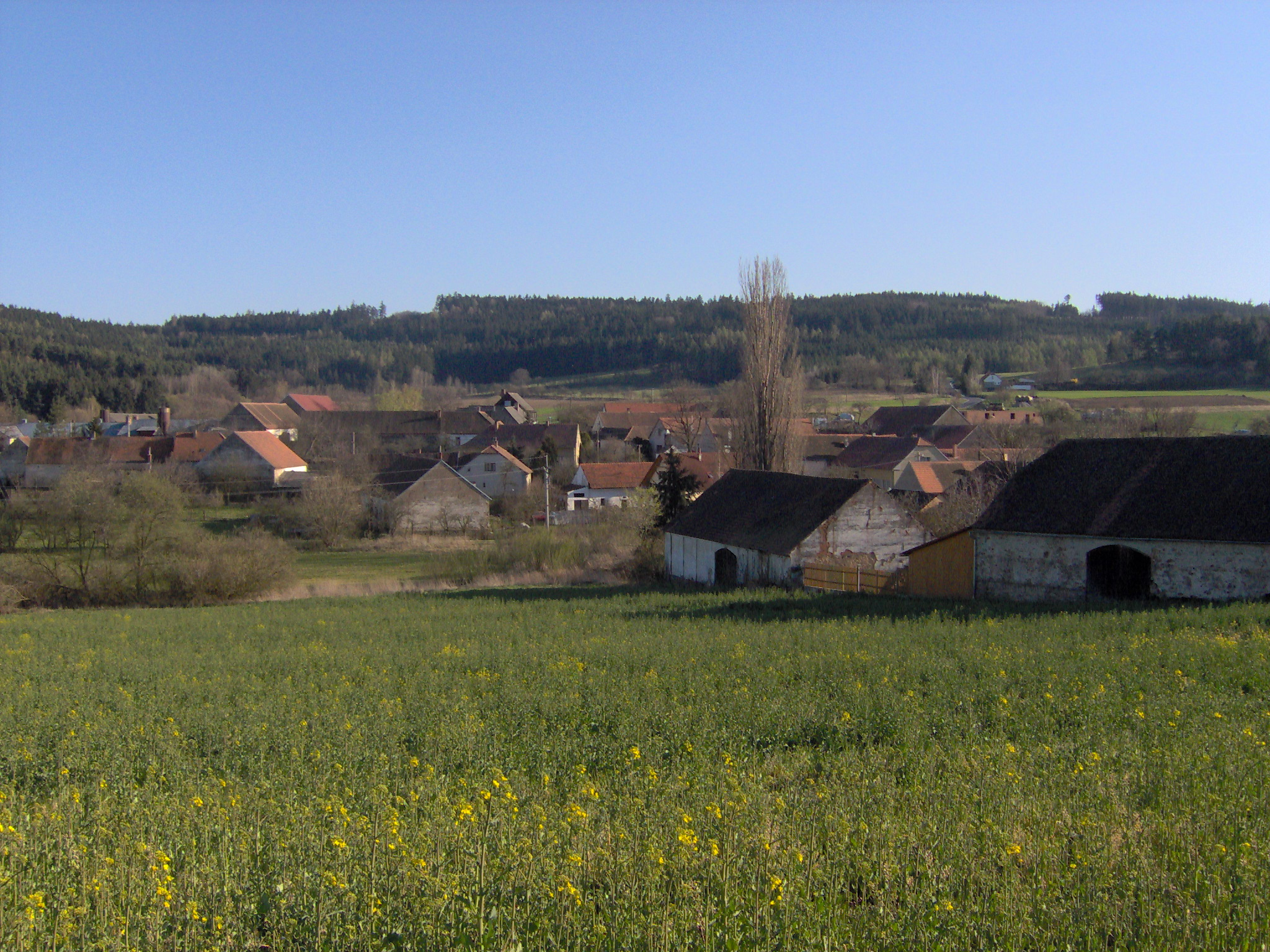
- View from the north

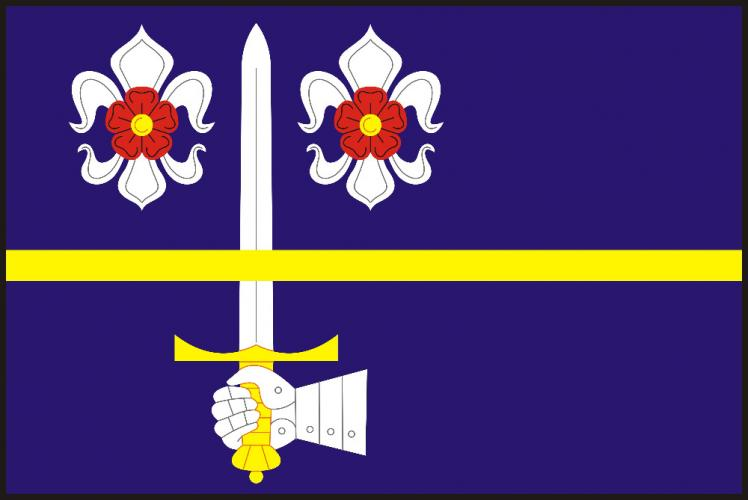
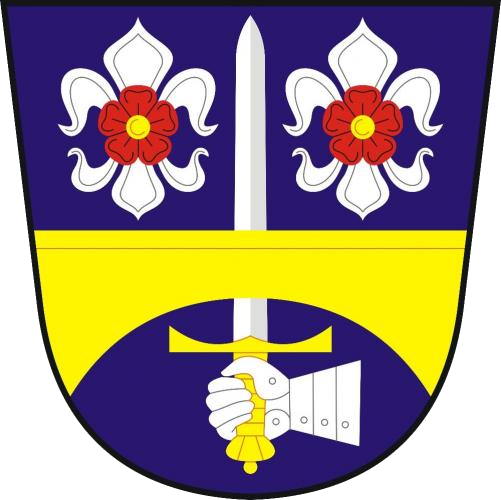
- Flag Coat of arms

- Location in the Czech Republic
- Coordinates: 49°11′0″N 13°59′34″E
- Country: Czech Republic
- Region: South Bohemian
- District: Strakonice
- First mentioned: 1334

Area
  - Total: 5.06 km^{2} (1.95 sq mi)
- Elevation: 498 m (1,634 ft)

Population (2026-01-01)
  - Total: 76
  - Density: 15/km^{2} (39/sq mi)
- Time zone: UTC+1 (CET)
  - Summer (DST): UTC+2 (CEST)
- Postal code: 386 01
- Website: www.obecskaly.cz

Skály is a municipality and village in Strakonice District in the South Bohemian Region of the Czech Republic. It has about 80 inhabitants.

Skály lies approximately 12 kilometres (7 mi) south-east of Strakonice, 42 km (26 mi) north-west of České Budějovice, and 106 km (66 mi) south of Prague.

== Demographics ==
Historical population
Year	Pop.	±%
1869	211	—
1880	260	+23.2%
1890	223	−14.2%
1900	184	−17.5%
1910	200	+8.7%
1921	199	−0.5%
1930	191	−4.0%
1950	153	−19.9%
1961	145	−5.2%
1970	109	−24.8%
1980	100	−8.3%
1991	77	−23.0%
2001	81	+5.2%
2011	66	−18.5%
2021	70	+6.1%
Source: Censuses
