= Richard Anthony Baker =

- Born: 2 September 1946; Leigh-on-Sea, Essex, England
- Died: 12 November 2016 (aged 70); Leigh-on-Sea, Essex, England
- Occupations: Radio producer, presenter, author

Richard Anthony Baker (2 September 1946 – 12 November 2016) was a British radio producer, presenter and author.

He was born in Leigh-on-Sea, Essex. His father was a London-born music hall performer who used the stage name Will Keogh; and his elder brother was the musician and composer John Baker.

Richard Anthony Baker worked for over 30 years for BBC Radio. He worked in the news room, as an editor on the Today programme among others, and also contributed to Week Ending. He devised, wrote and presented many programmes for Radios Two and Three, and presented over 300 editions of the obituary programme Brief Lives.

After leaving the BBC, he wrote many obituaries for The Stage magazine. He was an acknowledged expert on the British music hall and variety show traditions, and wrote a biography of Marie Lloyd as well as two books on the subject, Old Time Variety: An Illustrated History (2011) and British Music Hall: An Illustrated History (2014). He also co-edited the journal Music Hall Studies (2008–15), and wrote Many a True Word (2013), on the English language.

He died in 2016, aged 70.
