= Skály (Písek District) =

- Municipality
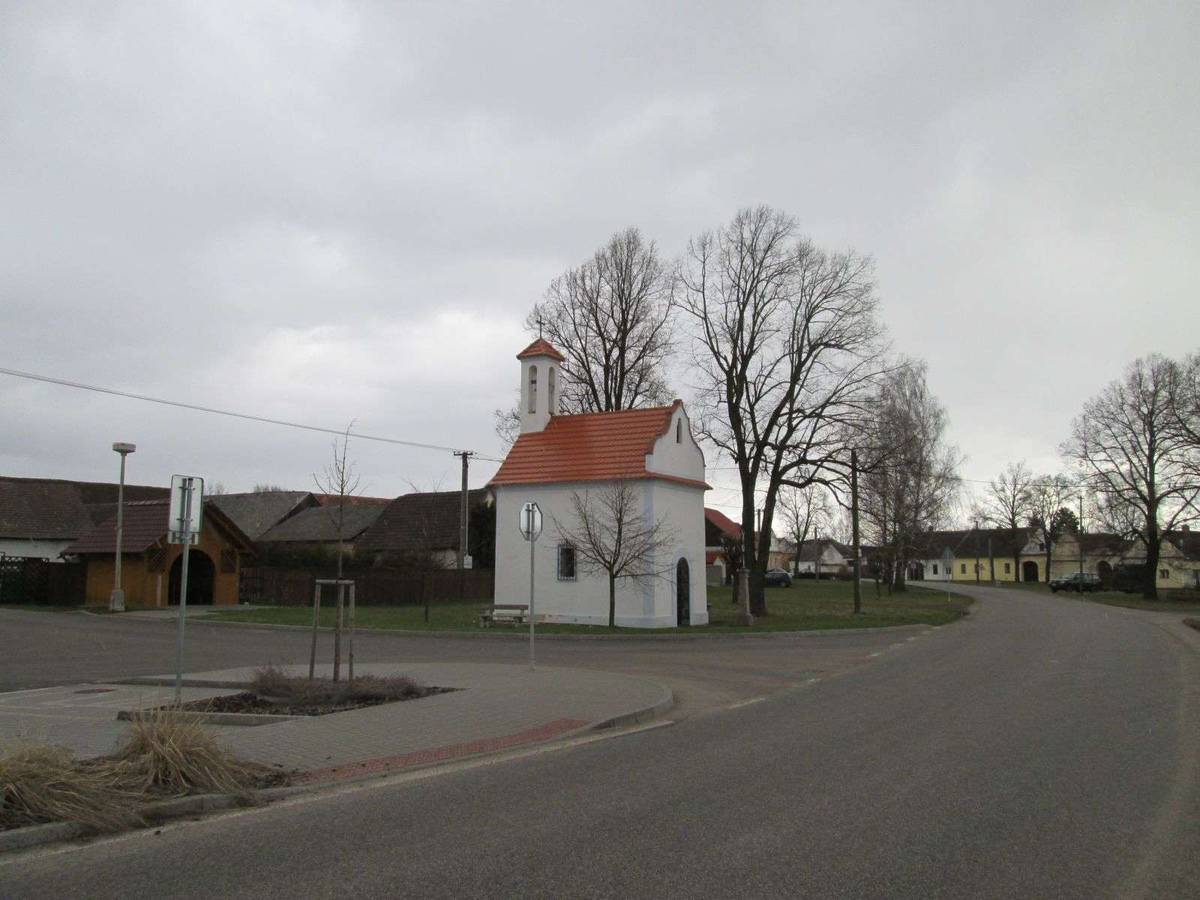
- Centre of Skály

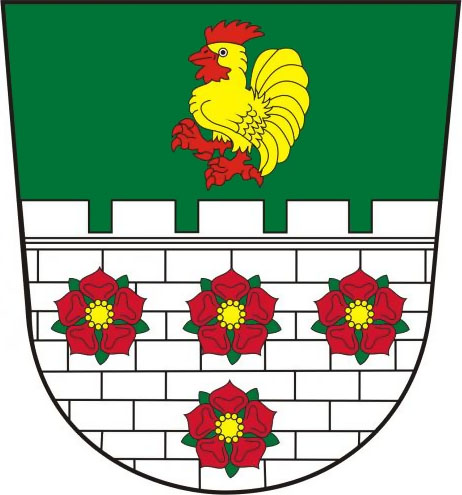
- Flag Coat of arms

- Location in the Czech Republic
- Coordinates: 49°13′12″N 14°9′37″E
- Country: Czech Republic
- Region: South Bohemian
- District: Písek
- First mentioned: 1365

Area
  - Total: 17.75 km^{2} (6.85 sq mi)
- Elevation: 387 m (1,270 ft)

Population (2026-01-01)
  - Total: 325
  - Density: 18.3/km^{2} (47.4/sq mi)
- Time zone: UTC+1 (CET)
  - Summer (DST): UTC+2 (CEST)
- Postal code: 398 11
- Website: www.skaly.net

Skály is a municipality and village in Písek District in the South Bohemian Region of the Czech Republic. It has about 300 inhabitants. The village of Budičovice within the municipality is well preserved and is protected as a village monument zone.

== Administrative division ==
Skály consists of two municipal parts (in brackets population according to the 2021 census):

- Skály (280)
- Budičovice (39)

== Etymology ==
The name Skály means 'rocks' in Czech.

== Geography ==
Skály is located about 9 kilometres (6 mi) south of Písek and 34 km (21 mi) northwest of České Budějovice. It lies in the České Budějovice Basin. The highest point is at 450 m (1,480 ft) above sea level. The stream Skalský potok flows through the municipality and supplies a set of fishponds. The Blanice River partly forms the northern municipal border.

== History ==
The first written mention of Skály is from 1365. The village was owned by various lower nobles, and the owners often changed. In 1397, Jan of Skály was documented as the owner of Skály. Shortly after the village was sold to the Kočka family, who held it until 1509. In 1543, when Skály was the property of the Litochleb of Strachotínek family, a fort in the village was mentioned for the first time, but this building has not been preserved.

The village of Budičovice was first mentioned in 1399.

== Demographics ==
Historical population

Year	Pop.	±%
1869	599	—
1880	664	+10.9%
1890	663	−0.2%
1900	643	−3.0%
1910	696	+8.2%

Year	Pop.	±%
1921	680	−2.3%
1930	653	−4.0%
1950	543	−16.8%
1961	500	−7.9%
1970	485	−3.0%

Year	Pop.	±%
1980	403	−16.9%
1991	316	−21.6%
2001	264	−16.5%
2011	267	+1.1%
2021	319	+19.5%

Source: Censuses

== Transport ==
Skály is located on the railway line of local importance from České Budějovice to Strakonice.

== Sights ==
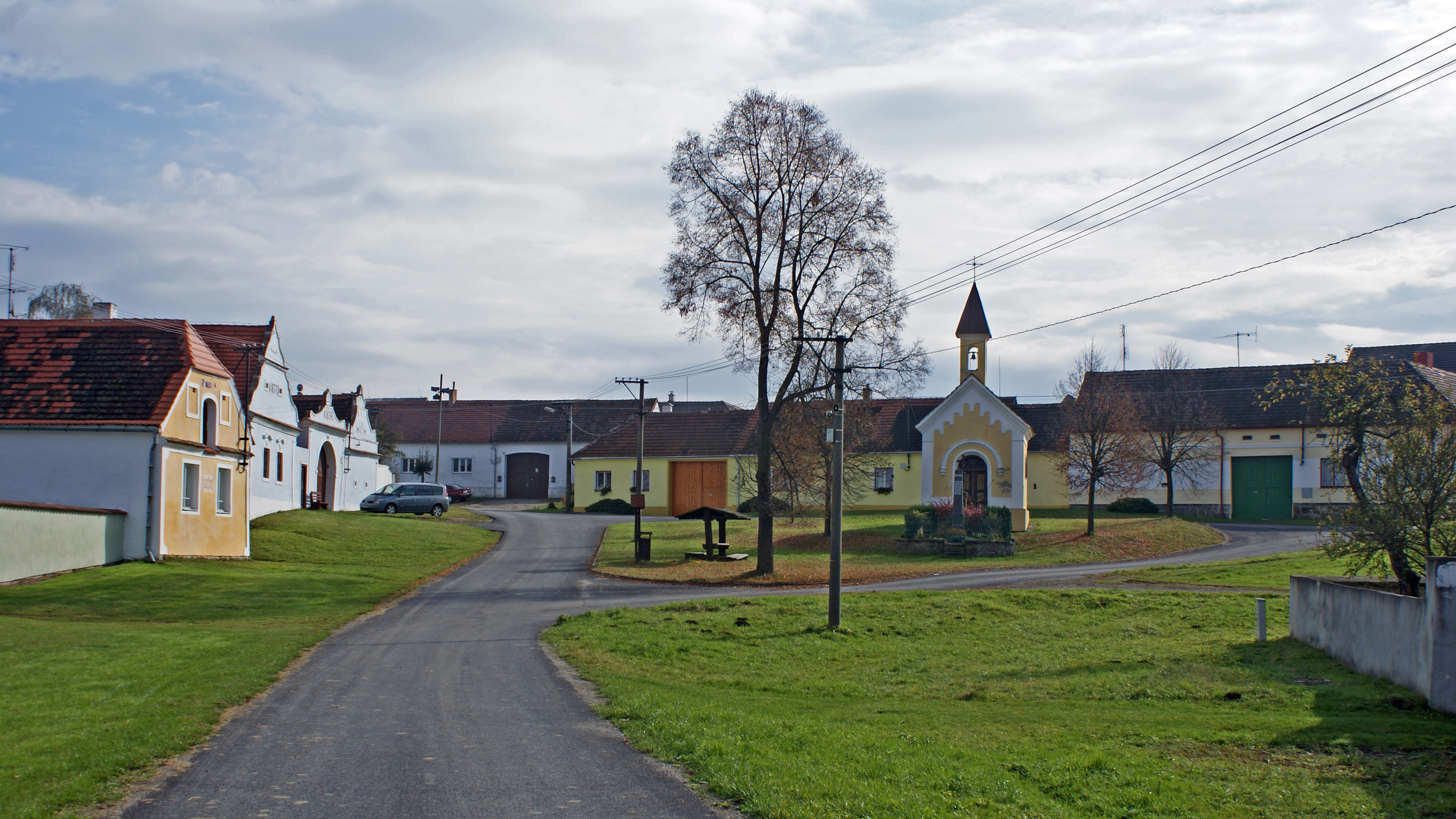
Centre of Budičovice

Budičovice is protected as a village monument zone for its folk architecture from the 19th century. The homesteads have decorated façades in the Folk Baroque style, typical for this region. The landmark of the village green is the Chapel of Saint John of Nepomuk from around 1875.
