= SecondHandSongs =

Music website focused on cover versions

Second Hand Songs
- Website type: Online database of cover songs
- Available in: English
- Founded: Belgium
- Owner: Discoversongs VZW
- Founders: Bastien De Zutter, Mathieu De Zutter, Denis Monsieur
- Website: https://secondhandsongs.com/
- Commercial: No
- Registration: Optional, only for contributing or editing data
- Launched: April 11, 2003; 23 years ago
- Current status: Active
- Content licence: Academic use
- Written in: PHP (Symfony), PostgreSQL

SecondHandSongs (or Second Hand Songs) is a collaborative website that maintains a global database of mainly cover versions of original works. It also contains information about adaptations and samples. The website allows performers and volunteer curators to add songs and update their metadata. It includes links to freely accessible recordings of the covers, and external identifiers for those works and performances in other databases.

As of 2021, it included roughly a million covers of 100,000 original works, and was cross-referenced by MusicBrainz.

As of 2025, the site's most covered musical composition is "Stille Nacht, heilige Nacht" (English version: "Silent Night! Holy Night!") written by Joseph Mohr and Franz Gruber in 1818, which has been covered 4,229 times.

== Data and uses ==
Data are contributed and edited by the active community, so the exact size of the database has changed over time. In 2007, the project included 60,000 covers. As of 2020, it had reached a million covers.

=== Data schema and identifiers ===
SecondHandSongs includes a work ID for each work, and a performance ID for each version (cover or original) of a work by a performer.

A work is an equivalence class, i.e. a list, of performances of the same underlying song. Each performer has, typically, only one performance for each work in the database.

=== Derived datasets ===
In 2011, the Million Song Dataset project released a SecondHandSongs subset (an intersection of SHS and MSD data). At the time, this was the largest dataset of cover songs available for academic research.

Later, it released the SHS100k dataset for machine learning, with 100k covers of 10k works. This has since become a benchmark for cover-song identification.

== See also ==
- WhoSampled, a similar website that also contains information about cover songs (as well as remixes), but is based more on samples and interpolations
